= List of World War I flying aces from Germany =

This is a complete list of World War I flying aces from the German Empire.

Aces were listed after verifying the date and location of combat, and the foe vanquished, for every victory accredited by an aviator's home air service. Aces awarded honors and thus shown to be notable are linked to their biographies.

Note: When more than one ace has the same number of kills, all their names are shown against the specified numbers. Hence if you find a number of aces against a number it means each of those aces has scored that number of victories

E.g.: Werner Voss and Josef Jacobs (both 48 kills)

German Aces	Victories claimed
Manfred von Richthofen	80
Ernst Udet	62
Erich Loewenhardt	54
Josef Jacobs	48
Werner Voss	48
Fritz Rumey	45
Rudolf Berthold	44
Bruno Loerzer	44
Paul Bäumer	43
Oswald Boelcke	40
Franz Büchner	40
Lothar von Richthofen	40
Heinrich Gontermann	39
Carl Menckhoff	39
Carl Bolle	36
Julius Buckler	36
Max Ritter von Müller	36
Gustav Dörr	35
Otto Könnecke	35
Eduard Ritter von Schleich	35
Emil Thuy	35
Josef Veltjens	35
Heinrich Bongartz	33
Heinrich Kroll	33
Kurt Wolff	33
Hermann Frommherz	32
Theodor Osterkamp	32
Paul Billik	31
Gotthard Sachsenberg	31
Karl Allmenröder	30
Carl Degelow	30
Josef Mai	30
Ulrich Neckel	30
Karl Emil Schäfer	30
Harald Auffarth	29
Walter Blume	28
Walter von Bülow-Bothkamp	28
Robert Ritter von Greim	28
Arthur Laumann	28
Friedrich Ritter von Röth	28
Fritz Otto Bernert	27
Otto Fruhner	27
Hans Kirschstein	27
Karl Thom	27
Adolf Ritter von Tutschek	27
Kurt Wüsthoff	27
Oskar Freiherr von Boenigk	26
Eduard Ritter von Dostler	26
Max Näther	26
Olivier Freiherr von Beaulieu-Marconnay	25
Georg von Hantelmann	25
Fritz Pütter	25
Erwin Böhme	24
Georg Meyer	24
Hermann Becker	23
Hermann Göring	22
Hans Klein	22
Hans Martin Pippart	22
Werner Preuss	22
Karl Schlegel	22
Rudolf Windisch	22
Hans Ritter von Adam	21
Friedrich Altemeier	21
Friedrich Friedrichs	21
Fritz Höhn	21
Friedrich T. Noltenius	21
Hans Bethge	20
Rudolf von Eschwege	20
Wilhelm Frankl	20
Hans von Freden	20
Walter Göttsch	20
Oskar Hennrich	20
Otto Kissenberth	20
Wilhelm Reinhard	20
Otto Schmidt	20
Christian Donhauser	19
Gerhard Fieseler	19
Kurt Wintgens	19
Alexander Zenzes	19
Hartmuth Baldamus	18
Franz Hemer	18
Emil Schäpe	18
Fritz Beckhardt	17
Hans Böhning	17
Walter Böning	17
Ernst Hess	17
Rudolf Klimke	17
Karl Plauth	17
Franz Ray	17
Hans Rolfes	17
Josef Schwendemann	17
Ernst Bormann	17
Ludwig Hanstein	16
Johannes Klein	16
Karl Odebrett	16
Wilhelm Seitz	16
Hans Weiss (aviator)	16
Karl Bohnenkamp	15
Albert Dossenbach	15
Rudolf Francke	15
Albert Haussmann	15
Alois Heldmann	15
Max Immelmann	15
Otto Löffler	15
Hans-Georg von der Marwitz	15
Edmund Nathanael	15
Wilhelm Neuenhofen	15
Viktor von Pressentin von Rautter	15
Theodor Quandt	15
Julius Schmidt (aviator)	15
Kurt Schneider (aviator)	15
Paul Strähle	15
Reinhold Jörke	14
Franz Piechulek	14
Georg Schlenker	14
Rudolf Wendelmuth	14
Hans-Joachim Buddecke	13
Siegfried Büttner	13
Friedrich Christiansen	13
Dieter Collin	13
Heinrich Geigl	13
Robert Heibert	13
Johannes Janzen	13
Christian Mesch	13
Otto Rosenfeld	13
Kurt Schönfelder	13
Erich Rüdiger von Wedel	13
Sebastian Festner	12
Erich Buder	12
Theodor Cammann	12
Gottfried Ehmann	12
Otto Esswein	12
Wilhelm Frickart	12
Bertram Heinrich	12
Walter Höhndorf	12
Gerhard Hubrich	12
Hans von Keudell	12
Max Kuhn	12
Friedrich Manschott	12
Hans Müller (aviator)	12
Franz Schleiff	12
Renatus Theiller	12
Bernhard Ultsch	12
Richard Wenzl	12
Heinrich Arntzen	11
Raven Freiherr von Barnekow	11
Joachim von Busse	11
Friedrich Classen	11
Franz Xaver Danhuber	11
Kurt-Bertram von Döring	11
Heinrich Drekman	11
Willi Gabriel	11
Stefan Kirmaier	11
Fritz Loerzer	11
Hans Nülle	11
Hermann Pfeiffer	11
Reinhold Poss	11
Hugo Schäfer	11
Rudolf Stark	11
Leopold Anslinger	10
Paul Aue	10
Dietrich Averes	10
Hans Berr	10
Franz Brandt	10
Otto Brauneck	10
Martin Dehmisch	10
Karl Gallwitz	10
Justus Grassmann	10
Paul Lotz	10
Rudolf Matthaei	10
Max Ritter von Mulzer	10
Alfons Nagler	10
Hans Schuez	10
Werner Steinhäuser	10
Erich Thomas	10
Paul Turck	10
Paul Wenzel	10
Hans Wolff (aviator)	10
Ernst Freiherr von Althaus	9
Arno Benzler	9
Konrad Brendle	9
Albert Dietlen	9
Otto Fitzner	9
Friedrich Huffzky	9
Herbert Knappe	9
Egon Koepsch	9
Fritz Kosmahl	9
Walter Kypke	9
Helmut Lange	9
Gustav Leffers	9
Herbert Mahn	9
Eberhard Mohnicke	9
Hans Karl Müller	9
Karl Pech	9
Willi Rosenstein	9
Karl Schattauer	9
Adolf Schulte	9
Georg Weiner	9
Paul Achilles	8
Ludwig Beckmann	8
Karl Bohny	8
Aloys Freiherr von Brandenstein	8
Otto Creutzmann	8
Gunther Dobberke	8
Friedrich Ehmann	8
Walter Ewers	8
Hans-Eberhardt Gandert	8
Max Gossner	8
Adolf Gutknecht	8
Wolfgang Güttler	8
Hans Gottfried von Häbler	8
Heinrich Henkel	8
Wilhelm Hippert	8
Hans Hoyer	8
Paul Hüttenrauch	8
Michael Hutterer	8
Fritz Jacobsen	8
Willi Kampe	8
Fritz Kieckhäfer	8
Franz Kirchfeld	8
Arthur Korff	8
Fritz Krebs	8
Karl Meyer (aviator)	8
Kurt Adolf Monnington	8
Otto Parschau	8
Friedrich Poeschke	8
Wolfram Freiherr von Richthofen	8
Claus Reimer	8
Karl Ritscherle	8
Richard Runge	8
Karl Scharon	8
Hans Schilling (aviator)	8
Viktor Schobinger	8
Carl-August von Schoenebeck	8
Wilhelm Schwartz	8
Fritz Thiede	8
Wilhelm Zorn	8
Fritz Anders	7
Gerhard Bassenge	7
Helmut Brünig	7
Hermann Dahlmann	7
Helmut Dilthey	7
Julius Fichter	7
Hermann Gilly	7
Hans Goerth	7
Gisbert-Wilhelm Groos	7
Hermann Habich	7
Otto Hartmann	7
Georg Ritter von Hengl	7
Josef Hohly	7
Kurt Jacob	7
Karl Jentsch	7
Martin Johns	7
Christian Kairies	7
Emil Koch	7
Hans Körner	7
Wilhelm Kühne (aviator)	7
Hans Kummetz	7
Herman Leptien	7
Albert Lux	7
Karl Mendel	7
Alfred Niederhoff	7
Paul von Osterroht	7
Richard Plange	7
Johann Pütz	7
Josef Raesch	7
Gustav Schneidewind	7
Marat Schumm	7
Georg Strasser	7
Karl Treiber	7
Kurt Ungewitter	7
Franz Walz	7
Johannes Werner	7
Karl Arnold	6
Johann Baur	6
Paul Bona	6
Moritz-Waldemar Bretschneider-Bodemer	6
Albin Bühl	6
Harry von Bülow-Bothkamp	6
August Burkard	6
Karl Deilman	6
Karl Engelfried	6
Alfred Fleischer	6
Gustav Frädrich	6
Mieczysław Garsztka	6
Friedrich Gille	6
Heinrich Haase	6
Erich Hahn	6
Albert Hets	6
Robert Hildebrandt	6
Otto Höhne	6
Alfred Hübner	6
Hans Imelmann	6
Johannes Jensen (aviator)	6
Erich Just	6
Willy Kahle	6
Max Kahlow	6
Otto Klaiber	6
Gustav Klaudat	6
Erich König	6
Kurt Küppers	6
Herman Kunz	6
Alfred Lenz	6
Ludwig Luer	6
Friedrich Mallinckrodt	6
Heinrich Maushake	6
Emil Meinecke	6
Konrad Mettlich	6
Alfred Mohr	6
Werner Niethammer	6
Hans Oberlander	6
Rudolf Otto	6
Arthur Rahn	6
Rudolf Rienau	6
Alfons Scheicher	6
Karl Schmückle	6
Edgar Scholtz	6
Erich Schütze	6
Wilhelm Schulz	6
Gunther Schuster	6
Heinrich Seywald	6
Erich Sonneck	6
Otto Splitgerber	6
Georg Staudacher	6
Kurt Student	6
Hermann Stutz	6
Reinhard Treptow	6
Hermann Vallendor	6
Hans Waldhausen	6
Heinrich Wessels	6
Siegfried Westphal	6
Ernst Wiehle	6
Hans Auer	5
Bernard Bartels	5
Joachim von Bertrab	5
Rudolf Besel	5
Otto Bieleit	5
Eduard Blaas	5
Hans-Helmut von Boddien	5
Erich Bönisch	5
Gustav Borm	5
Hans Bowski	5
Herbert Boy	5
Otto von Breiten-Landenberg	5
Friedrich-Karl Burckhardt	5
Karl Christ	5
Theodor Croneiss	5
Wilhelm Cymera	5
August Delling	5
Wilhelm Fahlbusch	5
Ludwig Gaim	5
Johannes Gildemeister	5
Siegfried Gussmann	5
Kurt Haber	5
August Hanko	5
Friedrich Hengst	5
Kurt Hetze	5
Hermann Juhnke	5
Werner Junck	5
Wilhelm Kohlbach	5
Johann Kopka	5
Wilhelm Leusch	5
Heinrich Lorenz	5
Hans Marwede	5
Erich Meyer	5
Hans-Georg von der Osten	5
Leopold Reimann	5
Hans Rosencrantz	5
Paul Rothe	5
Richard Rübe	5
Theodor Rumpel (aviator)	5
Johann Schlimpen	5
Roman Schneider	5
Herbert Schroeder	5
Friedrich Schumacher	5
Konrad Schwartz	5
Kurt Seit	5
Eugen Siempelkamp	5
Wilhelm Sommer	5
Helmut Steinbrecher	5
Wilhelm Stör	5
Karl Strünklenberg	5
Alwin Thurm	5
Oswald Traenkner	5
Gerold Tschentschel	5
Alfred Ulmer	5
Hans Viebig	5
Werner Wagener	5
Hasso von Wedel (aviator)	5
Ernst Wiessner	5
Kurt Wissemann	5
Martin Zander	5
