= Jagdstaffel 46 =

Jasta 46
- Active: 1917–1918
- Country: German Empire
- Branch: Luftstreitkräfte
- Type: Fighter squadron
- Engagements: World War I

Royal Prussian Jagdstaffel 46 was a "hunting group" (i.e., fighter squadron) of the Luftstreitkräfte, the air arm of the Imperial German Army during World War I. As one of the original German fighter squadrons, the unit would score 20 confirmed aerial victories over enemy observation balloons, plus thirty more over enemy aircraft. The Jasta paid a price of ten killed in action, one lost in a flying accident, six wounded in action, and three injured in accidents.

== History ==
Royal Prussian Jagdstaffel 46 was formed at FEA Graudenz on 11 December 1917. It mobilized on Christmas Day, under command of Leutnant Rudolf Matthaei, brought in from Jasta 5 for that purpose. It scored its first aerial victory on 12 February 1918. After Matthaei's death, a new commander was imported from Jasta 39, only to be killed in action. Leutnant Creutzmann was then assigned in from Jasta 43 and survived and served until war's end.

== Commanding officers (Staffelführer) ==
1. Rudolf Matthaei: 25 December 1917 – 17 April 1918 (Killed in flying accident)
2. Josef Loeser: 23 April 1918 – 3 June 1918 (KIA)
3. Otto Creutzmann: 5 June 1918 – 11 November 1918

== Aerodromes ==
1. Graudenz: 11 December 1917 – 29 December 1917
2. Ascq, Lille, France: 29 December 1917 – 12 March 1918
3. Bévillers, France: 12 March 1918 – 23 March 1918
4. Liéramont, France: 23 March 1918 – 31 July 1918
5. Moislains, France: 31 July 1918 – October 1918
6. Villers-Sire-Nicole, France: October 1918 – 11 November 1918

== Notable members ==
- Oskar Hennrich MMC, Iron Cross, top ace in squadron and balloon buster ace.
- Robert Heibert: MMC, Iron Cross.
- Helmut Steinbrecher: Iron Cross, first pilot to successfully deploy a parachute in combat.
- Otto Creutzmann: Iron Cross.
- Rudolf Matthaei: Iron Cross.

== Aircraft ==
The Jasta flew the Albatros D.Va and Pfalz D.IIIa, but the Fokker D.VII was the predominant aircraft used by the squadron.

== Operations ==
After going operational on 25 December 1917, the Jasta became part of Jagdgruppe Nord four days later. JG Nord, founded in January 1918, also contained Jasta 18 (before Rudolf Berthold's departure) and Jasta 57, and was tasked to 6th Armee.On 12 March 1918, Jasta 46 transferred to Jagdgruppe 2, joining Jasta 5 there. Jasta 46 would anchor JG 2 through war's end, even as Jasta 37 joined the Gruppe.

== Surviving aircraft ==
The only known surviving aircraft from Jasta 46 in the 21st century appears to be the restored Albatros D.Va owned by the Smithsonian's National Air and Space Museum, noted as being from Jasta 46 due to the squadron's characteristic pine green and yellow diagonal striping on the rear fuselage and tail surfaces uncovered through restoration and vintage photos.
