= Jagdstaffel 34 =

Jasta 34
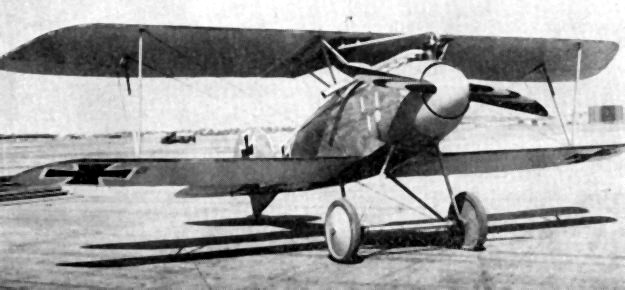
- Albatross D.III
- Active: 1917–1918
- Country: German Empire
- Branch: Luftstreitkräfte
- Type: Fighter squadron
- Engagements: World War I

Royal Bavarian Jagdstaffel 34, commonly abbreviated to Jasta 34, was a "hunting group" (i.e., fighter squadron) of the Luftstreitkräfte, the air arm of the Imperial German Army during World War I. The unit would score 89 confirmed aerial victories during the war, including three enemy observation balloons. In turn, they would suffer eleven killed in action, one killed in a flying accident, five wounded in action, one injured in an accident, and five taken prisoner of war.

== History ==
Jasta 34 was founded on 20 February 1917 at FEA 1, Altenburg. It made its first combat forays on 18 March in the Armee-Abteilung C Sector; six days later, the new squadron's first victories were scored by Eduard Ritter von Dostler and Hans von Adam. On 17 July 1917, it was officially designated as a squadron belonging to the Kingdom of Bavaria. The new unit would serve through war's end, and be disbanded with the rest of the German air force.

== Commanding officers (Staffelführer) ==
1. Eduard von Dostler: 20 February 1917 – 9 June 1917
2. Franz Walz: transferred in from Jasta 2 on 9 June 1917 – transferred out on 19 June 1917
3. Robert Ritter von Greim: 19 June 1917 – 11 November 1918

== Aerodromes ==
1. Altenberg: 20 February 1917 – 25 February 1917
2. Mars-la-Tour: 25 February 1917 – 5 September 1917
3. Mont Verdun: 5 September 1917 – 19 October 1917
4. Cuirieux: 19 October 1917 – 22 November 1917
5. Chenois, Virton: 22 November 1917 – 15 March 1918
6. Le Cateau: 16 March 1918 – 27 March 1918
7. Vraignes: 27 March 1918 – 12 April 1918
8. Foucaucourt: 18 April 1918 – 31 July 1918
9. Saint Christ: 31 July 1918 – 11 August 1918
10. Hervilly: 11 August 1918 – 29 August 1918
11. Séranvillers: 29 August 1918 – 4 September 1918
12. Bévillers: 5 September 1918 – 30 September 1918
13. Escarmain: 1 October 1918 – 7 October 1918
14. Givry: 7 October 1918 – 25 October 1918
15. Gosselies, Charleroi: 25 October 1918 – 11 November 1918
16. Diedenhofen: 11 November 1918

== Notable members ==
Robert Ritter von Greim and Eduard Ritter von Dostler commanded the squadron for virtually its entire existence. Both aces won the Pour le Mérite ("Blue Max"); both also were knighted by being awarded the Kingdom of Bavaria's most prestigious medal, the Military Order of Max Joseph. Additionally, Greim's 27 victories were about a third of the squadron's total.

Hans Ritter von Adam won both the Iron Cross and the Max-Joseph. Heinrich Geigl won the House Order of Hohenzollern, and the Iron Cross. Max Kahlow, Rudolf Stark, and August Delling all became aces with Jasta 34 and were awarded an Iron Cross apiece.

Johann Pütz and Alfons Scheicher were two more aces who served with the squadron.

== Aircraft ==
Jasta 34 was founded with Albatros D.IIIs, on 20 February 1917. By 6 March 1918, they were operating Albatros D.V and Albatros D.Va fighters. The following month, on 10 April, they received Fokker Dr.I triplanes and Pfalz D.IIIs. On 15 June 1918, they took Fokker D.VIIs on strength. Near the end of August, they also received some Pfalz D.XIIs. The unit's aircraft markings featured white or silver tails and rear fuselages.

== Operations ==
Jasta 34's initial assignment was in the Armee-Abteilung C Sector; they were stationed at Mars-le-Tour. They moved to support 5 Armee on 5 September 1917. By 16 March 1918, the squadron was supporting 2 Armee from the aerodrome at Le Cateau; it would continue to support 2 Armee through a flurry of a dozen airfield changes as the war wound to a finish, and the aviation unit consequently disbanded.
