= Gaim (disambiguation) =

Gaim may refer to:

- Pidgin (software), formerly called "Gaim"
- Kamen Rider Gaim, the Japanese TV series shortened to "Gaim"
- Grete Gaim, an Estonian biathlete
- Gaim, a fictional civilization in Babylon 5
- Ludwig Gaim (born 1892), German First World War flying ace
