= William Sanday =

William Sanday may refer to:

- William Sanday (theologian) (1843–1920), British theologian and biblical scholar
- William Sanday (RAF officer) (1883–?), British World War I flying ace
