= Jagdstaffel 7 =

Jasta 7
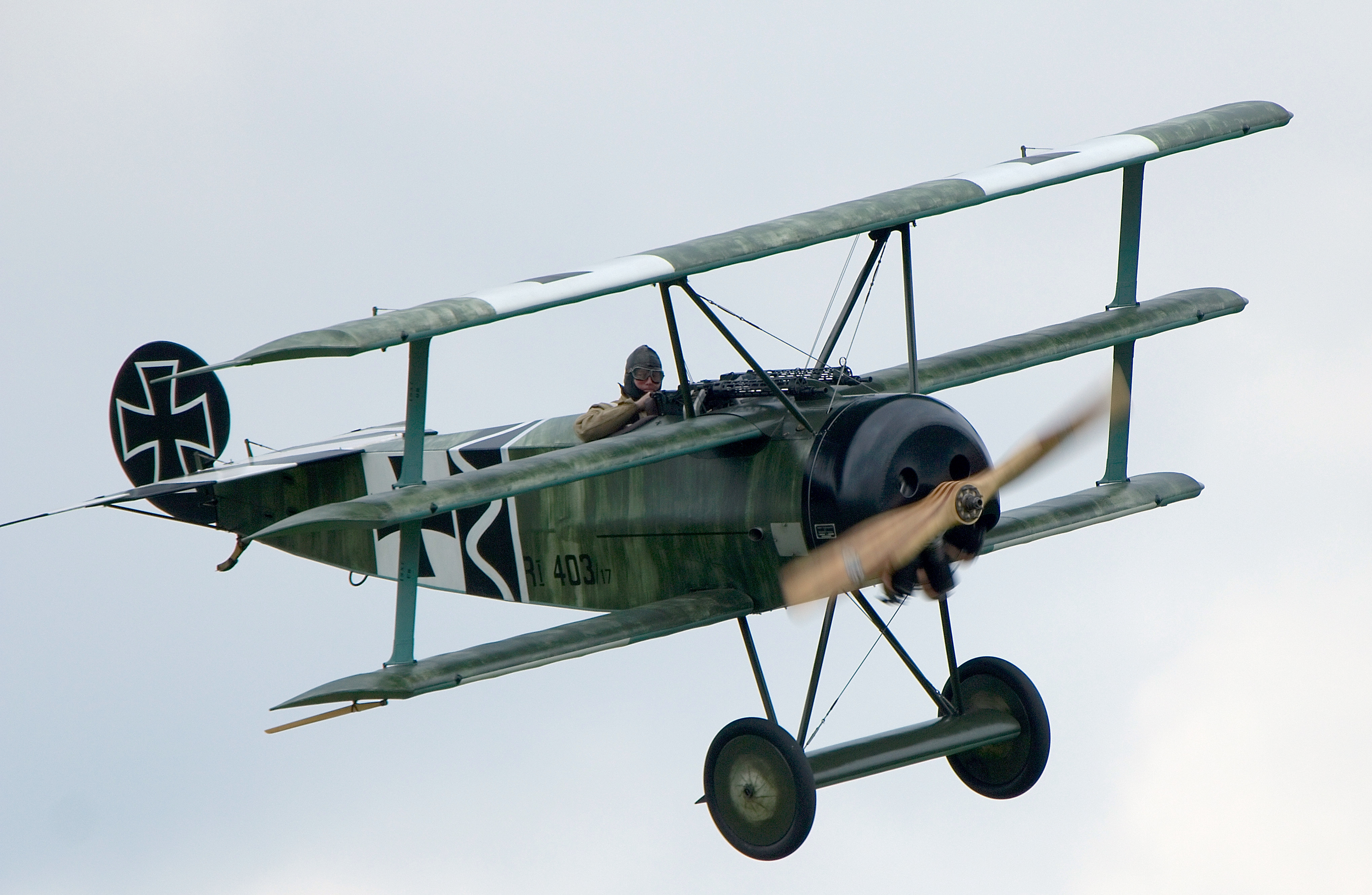
- Jasta 7 was equipped with Fokker triplanes
- Active: 1916–1918
- Country: German Empire
- Branch: Luftstreitkräfte
- Type: Fighter squadron
- Engagements: World War I

Royal Prussian Jagdstaffel 7 was a "hunting group" (i.e., fighter squadron) of the Luftstreitkräfte, the air arm of the Imperial German Army during World War I. The unit would score 126 aerial victories (130 claimed) during the war, at the expense of eleven killed in action, two killed in flying accidents, and twelve wounded in action.

== History ==
On 2 June 1916, a Fokkerstaffel was founded at Martincourt; this temporary grouping was under XVI Corps of 5 Armee. It was quickly superseded on 23 August 1916, when it was designated as Royal Prussian Jagdstaffel 7. A month later, on 21 September, it was activated. In Autumn 1917, Jasta 7 joined Jagdgruppe II, along with Jasta 29, Jasta 33, and Jasta 35. The new JG 11 supported 4 Armee, and was commanded by Otto Schmidt.

In early 1918, Jasta 7 became part of Jagdgruppe Dixmuiden, along with Jasta 16 and Jasta 51, under command of Oberleutnant Hans-Eberhardt Gandert; it then moved to Rumbeke. It now became part of Jagdgruppe 6, along with Jasta 28, Jasta 47, and Jasta 51; Gandert commanded the group. In May, it moved again, to Saint Marguerite. The Jasta, along with Jasta 51, remained a mainstay of JGr 6, while other squadrons were rotated in and out of the group. As the war wound down, Jasta 7 remained in JGr 6, under the command of Hauptmann Erhard Milch.

== Commanding officers ==
- Fritz von Bronsart-Schellendorf: 23 August 1916 - 21 July 1917 (KIA)
- Josef Jacobs: 2 August 1917 - c. 18 November 1918

== Duty stations (airfields) ==
- Martincourt, France: 23 August - 28 September 1916
- Bellevue Ferme, Senon, France: 28 September - 19 October 1916
- La-Jolly Ferme, Stenay, France: 20 October - 1 November 1916
- Procher, France: 2 November 1916 - 4 May 1917
- Eswars, France: 4 May - 6 June 1917
- Thouroube, Roulers, Belgium: 6 June - 22 August 1917
- Wynghene, Belgium: 22 August - 15 September 1917
- Aertrycke, North of Torhout, Belgium: 15 September 1917 - 1 March 1918
- Rumbeke, Belgium: 1 March - 14 March 1918
- Roulers, Belgium: 14–29 March 1918
- Sainte Marguerite, Belgium: 29 March - 1 October 1918
- Menen, Belgium 1 October - 11 November 1918

== Personnel ==
Josef Jacobs lengthy service and long leadership while he accrued 43 victories made him responsible for single-handedly scoring about a third of the unit's wins. However, a number of other notable aces served in the unit, including Friedrich Manschott, Paul Hüttenrauch, Paul Billik, Carl Degelow, Georg Meyer, Otto Schmidt, and Olivier Freiherr von Beaulieu-Marconnay.

== Aircraft and operations ==
Jasta 7 used Albatros D.V and a few Albatros D.III (these until early September 1917) when Josef Jacobs took command; Albatros D.Va, Pfalz D.III and Pfalz D.IIIa were also used from late September 1917 to spring 1918, before using Fokker Triplanes and Fokker D.VIIs as of May 1918. Earlier aircraft assigned remain unknown at this time.
