= Hennrich =

Hennrich is a surname. Notable people with the surname include:

- Kurt Hennrich (1931–2020), Czech alpine skier
- Michael Hennrich (born 1965), German lawyer and politician
- Oskar Hennrich, German World War I flying ace

== See also ==
- Heinrich (surname)
- Henrich
