= Wilhelm Fahlbusch =

German flying ace (1892–1916)

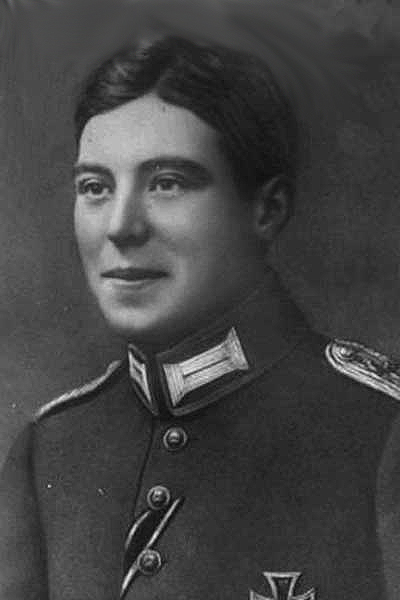
- Wilhelm Fahlbusch 1916 with his Iron Cross
- Born: 8 February 1892; Hanover, Germany
- Died: 6 September 1916 (aged 24); Malincourt, France
- Military career
- Allegiance: German Empire
- Branch: Flying service
- Rank: Leutnant
- Nickname: "Willi"
- Unit: KG 1
- Awards: Iron Cross

Leutnant Wilhelm Fahlbusch (8 February 1892 – 6 September 1916) was an early World War I flying ace credited with five aerial victories, shared with his observer Hans Rosencrantz.

== Career ==
Fahlbusch (on right) and Hans Rosencrantz

Wilhelm Fahlbusch was born in Hanover on 8 February 1892. Little is known of this pioneering ace's career. "Willi" Fahlbusch was that rarity in the Luftstreitkräfte, a reconnaissance pilot who became an ace. He flew as a member of Kasta 1, teamed with Hans Rosencrantz in a Roland Whale. They were credited with five aerial victories during 1916, with the last being scored on 31 August 1916 over a British Martinsyde Elephant two-seater craft. Fahlbusch was awarded the Iron Cross for his valor.

On 6 September 1916, Fahlbusch and Rosencrantz clashed with Sopwith 1 1/2 Strutters from No. 70 Squadron Royal Flying Corps. The German duo were shot down in flames over Malincourt, with three British air crews posting victory claims. Credit was granted to both Bernard Beanlands and his observer, and William Sanday and his observer.
