= Johannes Jensen (aviator) =

German flying ace (1898–1978)

- Born: 17 April 1898; Wasdow, Grand Duchy of Mecklenburg-Schwerin
- Died: 7 February 1978 (aged 79); Aalen, Germany
- Military career
- Allegiance: Germany
- Branch: Aviation
- Rank: Leutnant
- Unit: Jasta 57
- Awards: Iron Cross

Lieutenant Johannes Jensen (17 April 1898 – 7 February 1978) was a German World War I flying ace credited with six aerial victories.

Jensen piloted a Fokker D.VII for Jagdstaffel 57 during 1918. He scored his first aerial victory on 17 April 1918. During August and September, he shot down four more British aircraft. On 2 October, he was credited with destroying an observation balloon. A seventh victory went unconfirmed.

Johannes Jensen died in Aalen, Germany, on 7 February 1978.
