= Hans Rosencrantz =

- Hans Rosencrantz (left) with his pilot Wilhelm Fahlbusch
- Born: 9 August 1890; Wöllstein, Grand Duchy of Hesse
- Died: 6 September 1916 (aged 26); Malincourt, France
- Military career
- Allegiance: German Empire
- Branch: Aviation
- Rank: Leutnant
- Unit: Kagohl 1
- Awards: Iron Cross

Leutnant Hans Rosencrantz (9 August 1890 – 6 September 1916) was a German World War I flying ace credited with five aerial victories, shared with his pilot Wilhelm Fahlbusch.

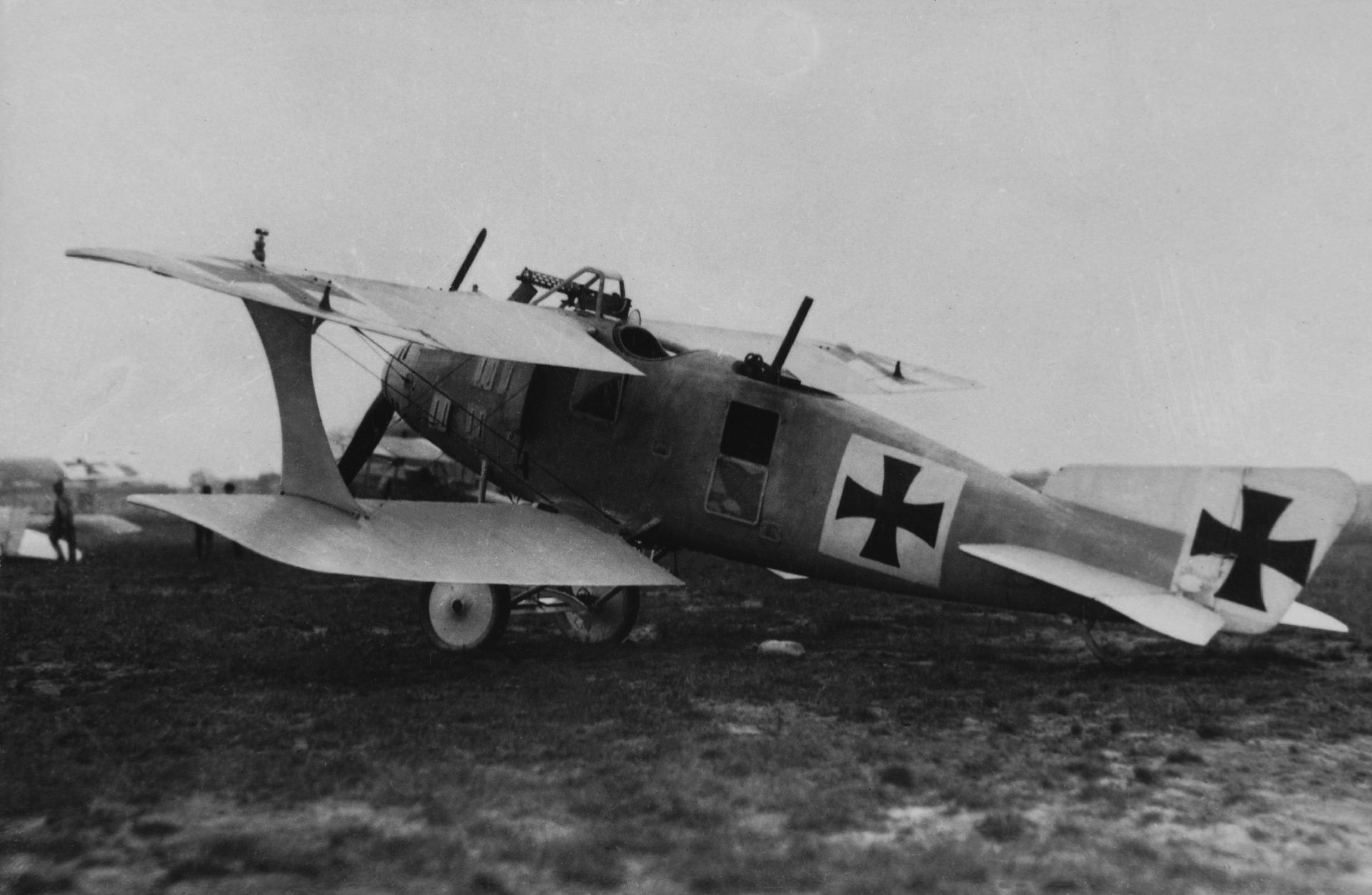
A typical Roland Whale. Rear gun aimed skyward.

== Biography ==
See also Aerial victory standards of World War I

Hans Rosencrantz (sometimes called Hermann) was born on 9 August 1890 in Wöllstein, Grand Duchy of Hesse, the German Empire.

Rosencrantz served during the First World War as an aerial observer in Kagohl 1. The observer manned the rear gun in the two-seater Roland Whale. In concert with his pilot, Wilhelm Fahlbusch, he shot down four enemy airplanes in early 1916. On 31 August, they shot down a Martinsyde G100 from No. 27 Squadron RFC for their fifth aerial victory, and became aces.

On 6 September 1916, Rosencrantz and Fahlbusch engaged Sopwith 1 1/2 Strutter two-seater fighters from No. 70 Squadron RFC. The German duo were shot down in flames over Malincourt, France. Credit for their demise was given to Bernard Paul Gascoigne Beanlands, William Sanday, and their observers.
