= Hermann Vallendor =

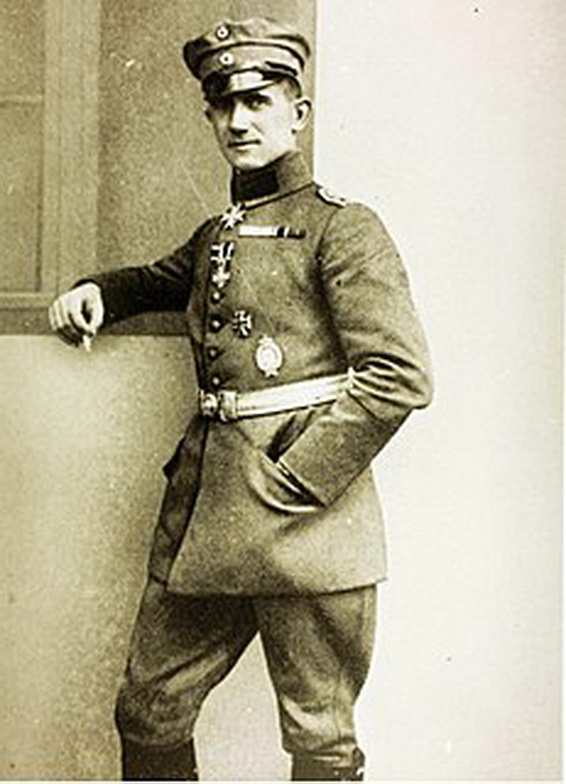
- Hermann Vallendor photographed during WW1
- Born: 13 April 1894; Offenburg, Grand Duchy of Baden, German Empire
- Died: 15 November 1974 (aged 80); Montevideo, Uruguay
- Military career
- Allegiance: Germany
- Branch: Aviation
- Rank: Leutnant
- Units: Flieger-Abteilung 23, Jagdstaffel 2
- Awards: Knight's Cross 2nd Class of the Order of the Zähringer Lion, Iron Cross First and Second Class

Hermann Vallendor (13 April 1894 – 15 November 1974) was a German World War I flying ace.

== Early life ==
Hermann Vallendor was born in Offenburg, the Grand Duchy of Baden on 13 April 1894. He was an engineering student in Mannheim before World War I began.

== Service in World War I ==
Vallendor joined the 114th Infantry Regiment of the German Army on 16 October 1914. He was promoted to Gefreiter on 19 May 1915. He was awarded the Iron Cross Second Class on 29 July 1915. A promotion to Vizefeldwebel followed on 5 December 1915. He then was raised from the enlisted ranks, being commissioned as a leutnant in the reserves on 24 December 1915.

He transferred to aviation duty and began pilot's training with FEA 5 on 16 October 1916. When he completed pilot's school, he exited training for Armee Flugpark 2 on 19 February 1917. In May 1917, he went to FA 23 to fly two-seaters. He soon left that detachment, to begin attending fighter pilot's school on 24 June 1917. He was then posted to a fighter unit, Jagdstaffel 2 on 5 July 1917. As was customary in German military aviation of the time, Vallendor had his aircraft emblazoned in his personal insignia. In his case, the marking was a huge white "V" on the fuselage. When he used a Fokker Triplane, he also had the "V" painted on its top wing.

Vallendor received the Order of the Zähringer Lion from his native Baden on 14 December 1917. He achieved his first aerial victory on 3 February 1918. He was awarded the Iron Cross First Class on 7 March 1918 and went on to score five more victories before war's end.

== List of aerial victories ==
See also Aerial victory standards of World War I

No.	Date/time	Aircraft	Foe	Result	Location	Notes
1	3 February 1918 @ 1520 hours	Albatros D.V	Sopwith Camel	Destroyed	East of Moorslede, Belgium	41 Sqn. RFC, 2/Lt. G. A. Lipsett killed in action
2	27 March 1918	Fokker Triplane	Royal Aircraft Factory SE.5a	Set afire in midair; destroyed	Northwest of Albert, France	Victim was Lt. W. S. Maxwell KIA from No. 56 Squadron
3	27 September 1918 before noon	Fokker D.VII	Sopwith Camel serial number D9472	Destroyed	North of Bourlon Wood, France	Victim was 2/Lt.W. A. Brett KIA from No. 73 Squadron RAF
4	27 September 1918	Fokker D.VII	Sopwith Camel	Destroyed	Marquion, France	Victim was 73 Sqn. RAF, Capt. William Henry Hubbard force landed ok.
5	9 October 1918 @ 1440 hours	Fokker D.VII	Airco DH.9	Destroyed	Sebourg, France	Victims were 107 Sqn. RAF, 2/Lt. C. Houlgrave, KIA & 2/Lt. W.M. Thompson, KIA
6	1 November 1918	Fokker D.VII	Royal Aircraft Factory SE.5a s/n E5662	Destroyed	Fresnes, France	Victim was Capt. C. L. Veitch, force landed, from No. 32 Squadron RAF

== Post World War I ==
After war's end, Vallendor moved to Buenos Aires, Argentina in 1920 to work for Deutsche Bank. He went on to Montevideo, Uruguay in 1921; there he founded a still existent family wholesale optical concern. Ge died on 15 November 1974 in Montevideo.
