= Bernard Beanlands =

- Born: Bernard Paul Gascoigne Beanlands; 9 September 1897; Victoria, British Columbia, Canada
- Died: 8 May 1919 (aged 21); Northolt
- Burial place: St Nicholas Church, Sevenoaks, Kent, England
- Military career
- Allegiance: Canada; United Kingdom
- Branch: Canadian Expeditionary Force; Royal Flying Corps
- Rank: Captain
- Units: Hampshire Regiment; No. 70 Squadron RFC; No. 24 Squadron RAF
- Awards: Military Cross

Captain Bernard Paul Gascoigne Beanlands MC (9 September 1897 – 8 May 1919) was a Canadian World War I flying ace credited with eight aerial victories.

== Early life ==
Bernard Paul Gascoigne Beanlands was born in Victoria, British Columbia, Canada on 9 September 1897. He was a minister's son; Canon Beanlands was rector of Christ Church Cathedral in Victoria. Beanlands' mother was Laura Maud Hills. Both parents predeceased their son.

The younger Beanlands was educated at Oundle School and the Royal Military College, Sandhurst, before joining the Hampshire Regiment in December 1914, in the first few months of World War I.

== World War I ==
Beanlands joined his unit in France in January 1915, taking part in the Second Battle of Ypres in April–May 1915. He was wounded in July that year. In August 1915 he transferred to the Royal Flying Corps and was awarded an Aviator's Certificate in February 1916. On 3 March 1916, Beanlands was promoted to lieutenant. On 31 May 1916, he was forwarded as a second lieutenant to be a Flying Officer with the Royal Flying Corps. On 1 September 1916, he was promoted to temporary lieutenant while serving with the RFC. Five days later, he scored his first aerial victory, killing aces Hans Rosencrantz and Wilhelm Fahlbusch in their reconnaissance two-seater. On 1 December 1916 he was appointed as Flight Commander, with a promotion to temporary captain.

He transferred postings to 24 Squadron, where he scored eight more victories between 25 August 1917 and 18 March 1918. On 21 March 1918, his aircraft was shot up while strafing German troops during the German Spring Offensive, with Beanlands having to force-land his aircraft. His aircraft was again hit by enemy fire the next day, badly injuring Beanlands, who was sent back to England for treatment. He was reported wounded in action in the magazine Flight on 11 April 1918. By that time, he had won the Military Cross, which was gazetted 25 April 1918:

...He has brought down three enemy aeroplanes out of control and driven down several others over the enemy lines.

== List of aerial victories ==
Beanlands' first victory was scored while he was with 70 Squadron. The rest of his triumphs came with 24 Squadron.

| No. | Date/time | Aircraft | Foe | Result | Location | Notes |
|---|---|---|---|---|---|---|
| 1 | 6 September 1916 @ 1845 hours | Sopwith 1 1/2 Strutter serial number A1902 | Roland reconnaissance plane | Destroyed by fire | Elincourt, France | Observer/gunner: C. A. Good. Victory shared with William Sanday and three other members of the RFC. Wilhelm Fahlbusch, Hans Rosencrantz KIA. |
| 2 | 25 August 1917 @ 0600 hours | Airco D.H.5 s/n A9165 | German reconnaissance plane | Destroyed by fire | Bellenglise, France | |
| 3 | 25 August 1917 @ 0600 hours | Airco D.H.5 s/n A9165 | German reconnaissance plane | Driven down out of control | Bellenglise, France | Shared victory. |
| 4 | 13 November 1917 @ 1230 hours | Airco D.H.5 s/n A9304 | Albatros D.III fighter | Captured | Schoorbakke | |
| 5 | 13 November 1917 @ 1230 hours | Airco D.H.5 s/n A9304 | Albatros D.III fighter | Driven down out of control | Schoorbakke | |
| 6 | 18 November 1917 @ 1105 hours | Airco D.H.5 s/n A9304 | Albatros D.III fighter | Driven down out of control | Nieuwpoort-Dixmude, Belgium | Shared victory |
| 7 | 30 November 1917 @ 1255 hours | Airco D.H.5 s/n A9304 | Albatros D.V fighter | Driven down out of control | East of Bourlon Wood | |
| 8 | 18 March 1918 @ 1140 hours | Royal Aircraft Factory SE.5a fighter s/n C1081 | German reconnaissance plane | Driven down out of control | Villers Le Sec, France | Victory shared with Harold Redler |

== Post World War I ==
After recovery from his injuries, Beanlands was appointed Wing Examining Officer for No. 18 Wing. He survived the war, joining 30 Training Depot Squadron at RAF Northolt, but was killed in a flying accident on 8 May 1919. He was buried in the northwest corner of the new ground in the cemetery of his father's home parish, at Sevenoaks (St. Nicholas) Churchyard, Kent, England.
