= Hans Ritter von Adam =

Bavarian World War I flying ace

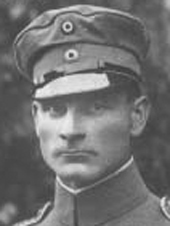
- Born: 24 May 1886; Bayerisch Eisenstein, Kingdom of Bavaria
- Died: 15 November 1917 (aged 31); Langemarck, Belgium
- Military career
- Allegiance: German Empire: Kingdom of Bavaria
- Branch: Bavarian Army; Imperial German Army: Luftstreitkräfte
- Service years: 1906 - 1907; 1914 - 1917
- Rank: Leutnant (Second Lieutenant)
- Units: 4th Infantry Regiment; Flier Detachment Artillery 2; Jagdstaffel 34
- Commands: Jagdstaffel 6
- Conflicts: World War I †: Battle of the Frontiers (WIA)
- Awards: Military Merit Order; Military Order of Max Joseph; Knight's Cross with Swords of the Royal House Order of Hohenzollern; Iron Cross

Leutnant Hans Ritter von Adam, born Hans Adam (24 May 1886 – 15 November 1917), was a Bavarian flying ace in World War I, with 21 victories before being killed in action. He enlisted as an infantry private and rose through the ranks to be commissioned an officer. His valor earned him his nation's highest awards, including one that posthumously raised him to nobility.

== Background ==
Hans Ritter von Adam was born as Hans Adam on 24 May 1886, in Bayerisch Eisenstein in the Lower Bavaria region of the Kingdom of Bavaria (a town now divided between Germany and the Czech Republic), son of a railway official, Andreas Adam, and his wife Hildegard née Fischer. Hans Adam entered the Royal Bavarian Army as a one-year volunteer (Einjährige-Freiwilliger) on 1 October 1906, serving in the 4th Infantry Regiment in Metz. He then became a businessman in Munich. By the time World War I began, Adam was married, with two children.

== Military service ==
Adam returned to service as a lieutenant in the Bavarian Landwehr (Leutnant der Landwehr) when World War I began. He was assigned to the Bavarian 15th Reserve Infantry Regiment. He fought in the Battle of the Frontiers and while fighting around the French fortifications in the Nancy-Épinal region was wounded in action on 2 September 1914.

After recuperating, he returned to the front in late 1915, but then chose to enter pilot training (despite his age, which made him much older than most pilot trainees). He received his Observer's Badge on 15 May 1916 and began service as an aerial observer. He flew as an observer for Eduard Ritter von Schleich.

On 2 March 1917, he joined Jasta 34 and scored his first three victories in an Albatros D.III. He then transferred to Jasta 6 when Oberleutnant Eduard Ritter von Dostler took command. On 12 July 1917 he shot down and killed ace Lt. A.W.B. Miller (6 victories) of No. 29 Squadron RFC for his fifth victory. Adam continued to score, totaling 12 confirmed victories by the end of August. He rose to become Staffelführer of Jasta 6 on 30 August 1917, after Dostler was shot down. Adam scored again the following day, then ran off seven more victories in September. He scored his 21st and final victory on 6 November 1917.

== Death ==
Adam was shot down and killed on 15 November 1917 near Langemarck in his Albatros D.V. He was fighting enemy aircraft from both No. 29 Squadron RFC and No. 45 Squadron RFC; Captain Kenneth Barbour Montgomery of No.45 Squadron, Royal Flying Corps was the apparent victor.

By the time of his death, Adam had already won the Iron Cross First Class and the Military Merit Order of Bavaria. However, posthumous awards continued. On 2 February 1918, Adam received the Knight's Cross with Swords of the Royal House Order of Hohenzollern. On 20 May 1919, Bavaria's highest military decoration, the Military Order of Max Joseph (Militär-Max-Joseph-Orden), was posthumously bestowed on him, with effect from 28 July 1917. On that date, as deputy Staffelführer of Jasta 6, while his Staffelführer chased one bomber, Adam had attacked and broken up the rest of a formation of enemy bombers, and continued the pursuit despite damage to his own aircraft, until his squadron had destroyed the enemy formation. For a commoner, award of the Military Order of Max Joseph carried with it a patent of non-hereditary nobility signified by the title "Ritter von", and Hans Adam posthumously became Hans Ritter von Adam.

Hans Ritter von Adam was interred in the Waldfriedhof in Munich, Germany.

== Decorations ==
- Iron Cross, 1st and 2nd Class
- Knight's Cross of the Military Order of Max Joseph
- Knight's Cross with Swords of the Royal House Order of Hohenzollern
- Military Merit Order
