= Jagdstaffel 41 =

Jasta 41
- Active: 1917–1918
- Country: German Empire
- Branch: Luftstreitkräfte
- Type: Fighter squadron
- Engagements: World War I

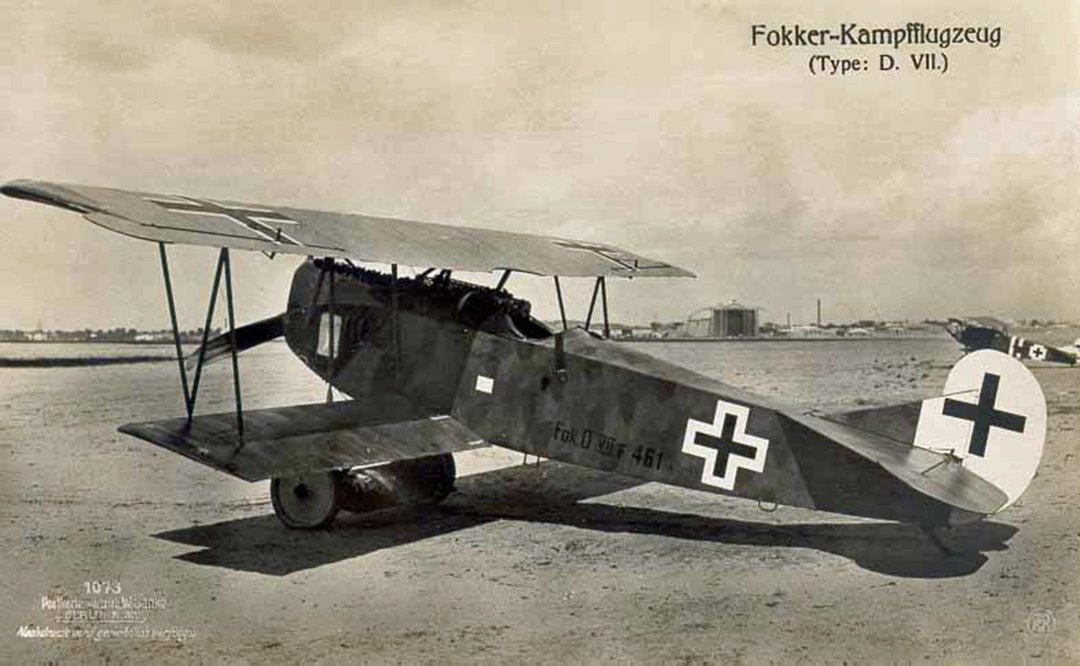
A historical postcard depicting a Fokker D.VII fighter aircraft at Johannisthal Airfield in 1918

Royal Prussian Jagdstaffel 41, commonly abbreviated to Jasta 41, was a "hunting group" (i.e., fighter squadron) of the Luftstreitkräfte, the air arm of the Imperial German Army during World War I. The unit would score 73 aerial victories during the war, including ten observation balloons downed. The squadron's victories came at the expense of ten killed in action, two killed in flying accidents, three wounded in action, and one taken prisoner of war.

== History ==
Jasta 41 was founded at Flieger-Abteilung (Flier Detachment) 4, Posen on 18 June 1917. It scored its first aerial victory on 3 September 1917.

== Commanding officers (Staffelführer) ==
- Maxmilian Zeigler gen Stege: until 3 September 1917 (KIA)
- Georg Schlenker: 3 September 1917
- Fritz Höhn: 30 September 1918
- Helmut Brünig: 4 October 1918

== Duty stations ==
- Posen
- Habsheim: 5 August 1917

== Notable personnel ==
- Josef Schwendemann
- Hans Weiss
- Georg Schlenker
- Walter Kypke

== Operations ==
Jasta 41 supported Armee-Abteilung B from 5 August 1917 onwards.
