= Friedrich Manschott =

- Friedrich Manschott
- Born: 21 February 1893; Reichartshausen, Großherzogtum Baden, German Empire
- Died: 16 March 1917 (aged 24) near Fort Vaux, Verdun, France
- Military career
- Allegiance: German Empire
- Branch: Imperial German Air Service
- Rank: Vizefeldwebel
- Unit: FA 203, Jasta 7
- Awards: Iron Cross First and Second Class

Vizefeldwebel Friedrich Manschott (21 February 1893 – 16 March 1917) was a German World War I flying ace credited with 12 aerial victories.

== Early life ==
Friedrich Manschott was born on 21 February 1893 in Reichartshausen, Großherzogtum Baden, the German Empire.

== Aerial service ==
Manschott earned his flyer's badge on 10 August 1916. His first assignment was to a reconnaissance unit, FA 203. There he downed his first foe, a Farman, on 15 December 1916. He was then transferred to a fighter unit, Jagdstaffel 7. Between 5 January and 16 March 1917, he shot down eleven more enemy. Immediately after he shot down his third observation balloon, on 16 March, he lost a combat to four Caudrons and was killed in action.

== Victory list ==
Confirmed victories are numbered; unconfirmed claims are labeled 'U/C'.

No.	Date/time	Foe	Location
1	15 December 1916	Farman	Messer Wood
2	5 January 1917 @ 1620 hours	Voisin	South of Douaumont
3	23 January 1917	Farman	Douaumont
4	1 February 1917	Voisin	Douaumont
5	2 February 1917 @ 1425 hours	Voisin	Courrières Wood
6	14 February 1917 @ 1710 hours	Farman	Esnes
7	17 February 1917 @ 1715 hours	Caudron	Vaux Lake
8	2 March 1917 @ 1525 hours	Farman	Hill 304
9	4 March 1917	Caudron	Northwest of Fort Michel
10	4 March 1917 @ 1645 hours	Observation balloon	South of Belleville
U/C	6 March 1917	Caudron	Louvemont-Côte-du-Poivre
11	9 March 1917 @ 1515 hours	Observation balloon	South of Belrupt
12	16 March 1917 @ 1115 hours	Observation balloon	South of Fort Vaux
