= Eduard Ritter von Dostler =

German World War I fighter

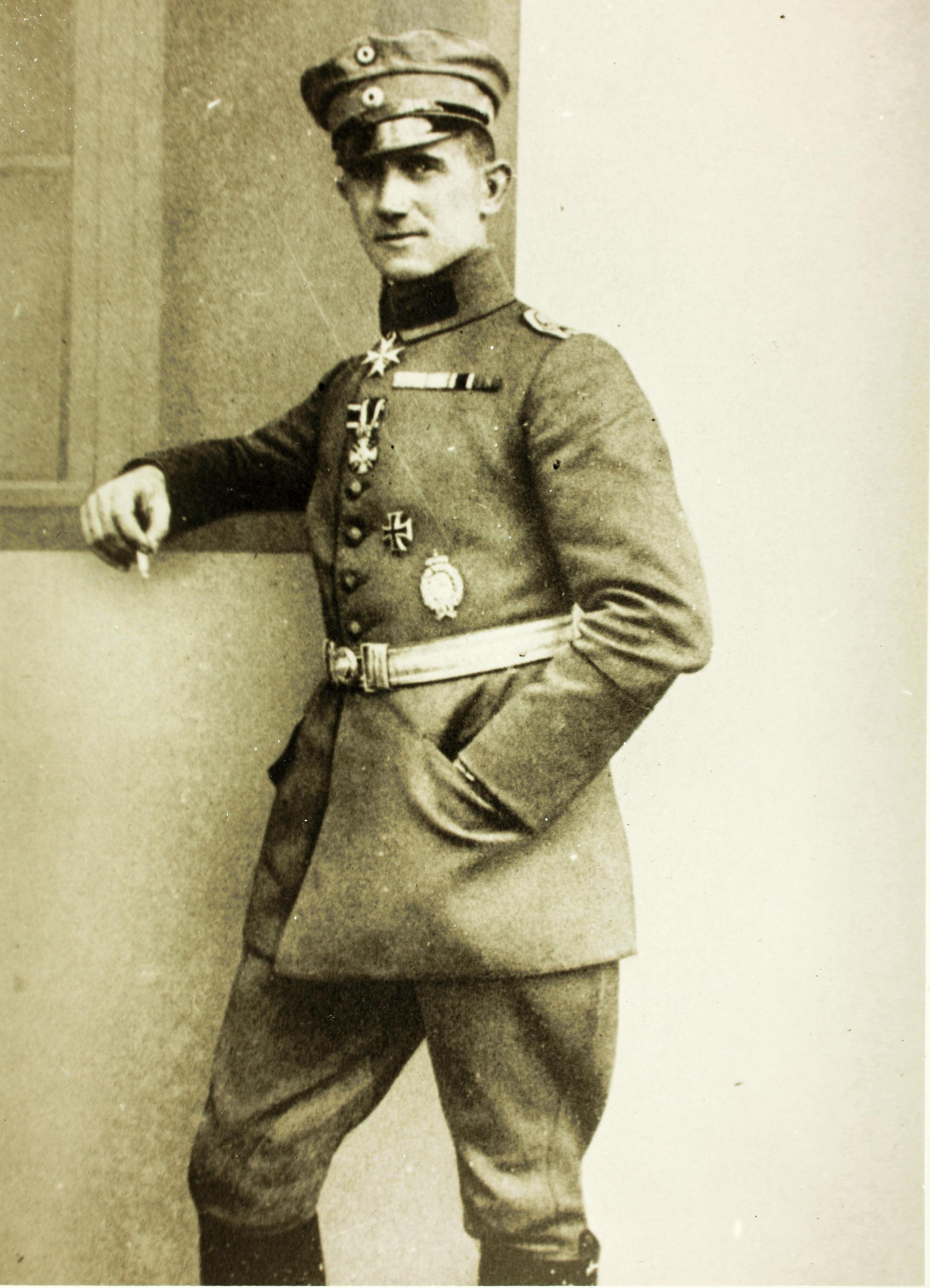
- Born: 3 February 1892; Pottenstein, Kingdom of Bavaria, German Empire
- Died: 21 August 1917 (aged 25) near Ypres, Belgium
- Military career
- Allegiance: German Empire
- Branch: Pioneers, Air Service
- Service years: 1912–1917
- Rank: Oberleutnant
- Units: 4th Pioneer Battalion; Schutzstaffel 27; Kampfstaffel 36
- Commands: Jagdstaffel 13; Jagdstaffel 34; Jagdstaffel 6
- Awards: Pour le Mérite; Royal House Order of Hohenzollern; Military Order of Max Joseph; Iron Cross; Bavarian Lifesaving Medal

Oberleutnant Eduard Ritter von Dostler (3 February 1892 – 21 August 1917) PlM, MOMJ was a German World War I fighter ace credited with 26 victories. On three consecutive assignments during World War I, Dostler was entrusted with the combat leadership of German jagdstaffeln (fighter squadrons).

== Early life and ground service ==
Eduard Dostler was born on 3 February 1892 in Pottenstein, Kingdom of Bavaria. He was commissioned in the 4th Pioneer Battalion of the Bavarian Army on 28 October 1912. He was awarded the Bavarian Lifesaving Medal for saving two of his men from drowning in the Danube River shortly after the war began, in August 1914. Later that month, Dostler went into action with his battalion in France on the Western Front. He won the Iron Cross First Class in March 1915. (Note: Previous award of the Second Class was a prerequisite.) He was also awarded his native Bavaria's Military Service Order.

Dostler's brother was a pilot who was killed in action. In response, Eduard Dostler decided to switch to the Die Fliegertruppen des deutschen Kaiserreiches (Imperial German Flying Corps) because of his brother's death.

== Air service ==
Dostler first reported to Schutzstaffel 27 (Protection Squadron) 27, then being reassigned to Kampfstaffel 36 (Tactical Bomber Squadron 36) on 15 June 1916. Dostler scored his first confirmed aerial victory while flying a Roland C.II two-seater for Kampfstaffel 36. He downed a Sopwith Scout on 17 December 1916.

He then transferred to Royal Prussian Jagdstaffel 13 (Fighter Squadron 13), a newly formed unit, taking command on 27 December 1916. On 22 January 1917, he scored Jagdstaffel 13's initial triumph. At that time, he was already an Oberleutnant. On 20 February 1917, Dostler assumed command of Royal Bavarian Jagdstaffel 34 upon its official formation. He had it in action in three days, and scored its first victories on 24 March, shooting down a pair of Caudron G.IV bombers. By the time he left the squadron, he had become an ace, with eight confirmed victories, and one claim unconfirmed.

Dostler transferred to Royal Prussian Jagdstaffel 6, assuming command in the wake of Fritz Otto Bernert's 9 June 1917 departure. Dostler scored a double victory on 16 June, with further wins on the 17th and 20th. Two days later, Jagdstaffel 6 was incorporated into Germany's first fighter wing, Jagdgeschwader I (Fighter Wing I).

By 26 July, when Manfred von Richthofen took command of Jagdgeschwader I, Dostler's score was up to 18. The following day, Dostler was awarded the Royal House Order of Hohenzollern. The day after that, Dostler led a patrol from his squadron into a momentous attack upon a formation of Airco DH.4s from No. 57 Squadron RFC; he shot two of the six British victims that day as Jagdstaffel 6 wiped out the British patrol. His twentieth victory qualified him for the Pour le Mérite. He finished the month of July 1917 with 21 victories.

On 6 August, he received Germany's highest award for valor, the Pour le Mérite, which is also nicknamed the Blue Max. Dostler's famous commanding officer, the Red Baron himself, Manfred von Richthofen took his personal Pour le Mérite from around his own neck and placed it around Dostler's throat for the wing's celebration of the award.

Dostler shot down five enemy aircraft in August, extending his list of victims to 26. His final victory was scored on 18 August 1917. Three days later, Dostler attacked an obsolete British R.E.8 of No. 7 Squadron RFC and was hit with machine gun fire. Dostler's airplane caught fire and exploded in midair. The flaming wreckage fell near Frenzenburg, Belgium.

Eduard Dostler was awarded the Military Order of Max Joseph after his death, backdated to 18 August 1917; its award both entitled him to a lifetime pension and granted him a non-hereditary knighthood As a visible sign of his honor, his name posthumously became Eduard Ritter von Dostler.

== Decorations and awards ==
- Bavarian military pilot badge
- Iron Cross of 1914, 1st and 2nd class
- Knight's Cross of the Royal House Order of Hohenzollern with Swords
- Pour le Mérite (6 August 1917)
- Military Merit Order, 4th class with Swords (Bavaria)
- Military Order of Max Joseph (18 August 1917, posthumously)
