= Jagdstaffel 57 =

Jasta 57
- Active: 1918
- Country: Kingdom of Prussia, German Empire
- Branch: Luftstreitkräfte
- Type: Fighter squadron
- Engagements: World War I

Royal Prussian Jagdstaffel 57, commonly abbreviated to Jasta 57, was a "hunting group" (i.e., fighter squadron) of the Luftstreitkräfte, the air arm of the Imperial German Army during World War I. The squadron would score over 32 aerial victories during the war. The unit's victories came at the expense of four pilots killed in action, one injured in a flying accident, four wounded in action, and one taken prisoner of war.

== History ==
Jasta 57 was founded at the pilots and observers training school at Königsberg on 6 January 1918. The new squadron began operations on 20 January 1918. Four days later, it was incorporated into Rudolf Berthold's Jagdgruppe Nord and tasked to support 6 Armee. On 26 February 1918, the unit flew its first combat missions. On 11 March, it scored its first aerial victories. Leutnant Hans Viebig (1897–1961), who would become Oberst of the Wehrmacht with the Knight's Cross of the Iron Cross, was first and shot down a Royal Aircraft Factory R.E.8 of the Royal Flying Corps.

On 23 April 1918, Jasta 57 was reassigned to 4 Armee. It moved once again on 6 June, to join Jagdgruppe 7 under Emil Thuy in support of 2 Armee. Five days later, JG 7 was reassigned to support 18 Armee. On 8 July 1918, Jasta 57 was posted to 1 Armee.

== Commanding officer (Staffelführer) ==
- Paul Strähle: 6 January 1918

== Duty stations ==
- Wasquehal, France: 24 January 1918
- Halluin: 23 April 1918
- Ennemain: 6 June 1918
- Neuflize: 8 July 1918
- Aniche, France: 21 August 1918
- Beuvry, France: 30 September 1918
- Chièvres, Belgium: 12 October 1918
- Champles: 4 November 1918

== Notable personnel ==
- Paul Strähle
- Johannes Jensen
