= Gottfried Ehmann =

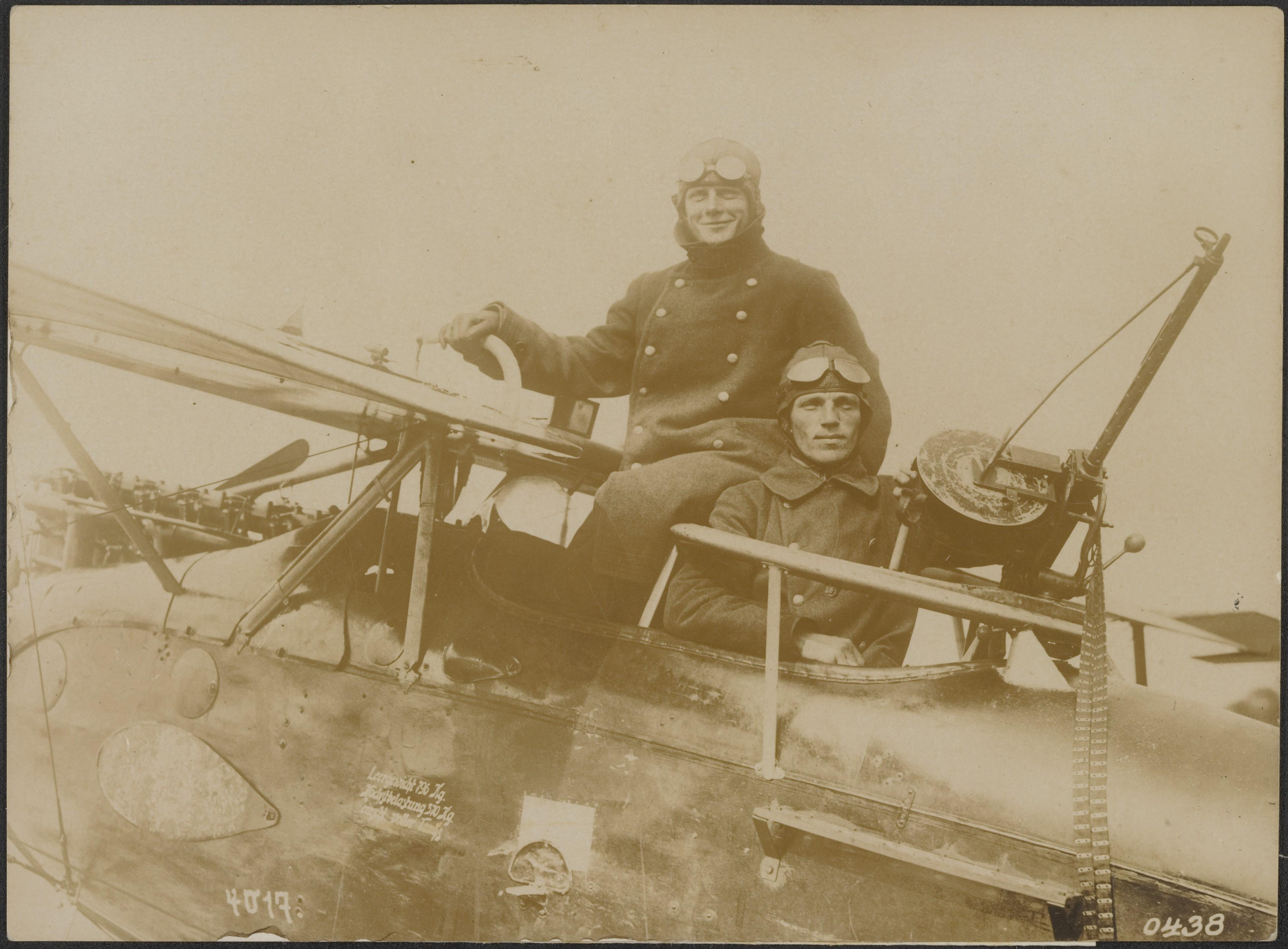
- Gottfried Ehmann (in his gunner's seat)
- Born: 1898
- Died: Unknown (post 8 December 1953)
- Military career
- Allegiance: German Empire
- Branch: Air Force
- Rank: Vizefeldwebel
- Unit: Shlasta 15
- Awards: Military Merit Cross; Iron Cross First and Second Class; Württemberg Military Merit Order

Vizefeldwebel Gottfried Ehmann was a German World War I flying ace credited with twelve aerial victories.

== Aerial service ==
Ehmann was assigned as a gunner/observer in a German two-seater unit, Schlachtstaffel 15. As a Flieger, he and a pilot named Warda had teamed-up for three victories, on 30 October 1917, 21 March, and 24 April 1918. They had also been promoted twice—to Gefreiter and Unteroffizier—and awarded the Iron Cross Second Class. Ehmann was then paired-off with Friedrich Huffzky in a Halberstadt CL.II. Between 4 June and 29 July 1918, the duo scored a string of nine victories, making them the most successful German two-seater team of the war. It also made Ehmann the top German two-seater gunner. These feats were recognized by the award of the Iron Cross First Class, the Golden Military Merit Cross (on 9 August 1918), as well as the Gold and Silver awards of the Württemberg Military Merit Order.

== Personal life ==
Gottfried Ehmann married 19-year-old Luis Catharina Raff on 18 March 1917, at Stuttgart-Degerloch, Kingdom of Württemberg. They would have one living daughter together.

Ehmann would serve in local government in later life, being a member of his local council on two separate occasions between 28 May 1946 and 8 December 1953.
