= Heinrich Geigl =

German WWI fighter pilot (1891–1918)

Heinrich Georg Geigl
- Born: 10 July 1891; Bad Abbach, Bavaria, German Empire
- Died: 4 April 1918 (aged 26) near Hamel, France
- Military career
- Allegiance: German Empire
- Branch: Imperial German Air Service
- Rank: Leutnant
- Units: Kampfgeschwader 6; Kampfstaffel 36; Jagdstaffel 34
- Commands: Jagdstaffel 16
- Awards: Royal House Order of Hohenzollern; Iron Cross First and Second Class

Leutnant Heinrich Georg Geigl (10 July 1891 – 4 April 1918) HOH IC was a World War I German flying ace credited with thirteen aerial victories. His midair collision with a Sopwith Camel killed him; however, the Camel was confirmed as Geigl's 13th victory.

== Early life ==
Heinrich Georg Geigl was born on 10 July 1891 in Bad Abbach, the Kingdom of Bavaria, the German Empire. Geigl was an elementary school teacher and a philosophy student in civilian life.

== World War I ==
Geigl joined the Imperial German Air Service during World War I. Once trained as a pilot, he completed reconnaissance assignments with Kagohl 6 and Kasta 36. On 26 February 1917, he was assigned to Royal Bavarian Jagdstaffel 34 as a fighter pilot. His first victory was on 29 April 1917; he became an ace with his fifth, on 10 August 1917. One week later, he was appointed to lead Royal Bavarian Jagdstaffel 16. Three days later, August 20, Geigl was wounded in action by small arms ground fire as he shot down a Caudron. The wound put him out of action for a while. He would not score again until 18 March 1918; between then and 3 April 1918, he would shoot down and destroy six more British airplanes. On 4 April 1918, during a dogfight, he collided with a Sopwith Camel, serial D6552 piloted by 2nd Lt. J.G. Kennedy from No. 65 Squadron RAF. Both pilots were killed and the Camel counted as Geigl's thirteenth win.
