= Max Kahlow =

- Born: 11 May 1894; Bad Schoenfließ, German Empire (present day Poland)
- Died: Unknown
- Military career
- Allegiance: German Empire
- Branch: Aviation
- Service years: 1913-1918
- Rank: Vizefeldwebel
- Unit: FA 42, Jagdstaffel 34
- Awards: Iron Cross

Vizefeldwebel Max Kahlow (born 11 May 1894, date of death unknown) was a German World War I flying ace credited with six aerial victories.

== Biography ==
=== Early life ===
Max Kahlow was born on 11 May 1894 in Bad Schoenfließ, German Empire; due to changes in political boundaries, the town is in present-day Poland.

=== Military service ===
Kahlow joined the military before World War I began, on 20 April 1913. By 14 March 1916, he was flying on the Eastern Front. In 1917, he moved to Romania. He joined Flieger-Abteilung (Flier Detachment) 42 in April 1917, and was teamed with Leutnant Paul Philipp as his observer when they scored an aerial victory on 31 May 1917. At some point, Kahlow had returned to Russia, as they shot down a Nieuport over Elipicesti.

In June 1917, Kahlow attended fighter training. On 18 June, he was posted to a Western Front fighter squadron, Jagdstaffel 34, for his final war assignment. He scored his second aerial victory on 29 July 1917. On 21 August, his craft was brought down by anti-aircraft fire, but Kahlow was unwounded. He would score four more confirmed victories during 1918. By the time he was discharged from the military on 15 December 1918, Max Kahlow had earned both the Second and First Class Iron Cross and the Kingdom of Bavaria's Military Merit Cross.

=== Later life ===
Max Kahlow would eventually become a Lufthansa pilot.
