= William Sanday (RAF officer) =

First world war pilot (1883–??)

William Douglas Stock Sanday
- Born: 28 May 1883; Woolton, Liverpool, Lancashire, England
- Died: Unknown
- Spouse: Mary Brodrick (m. 1905)
- Relatives: William Sanday (uncle)
- Military career
- Allegiance: United Kingdom
- Branch: British Army; Royal Air Force
- Service years: 1915–1919
- Rank: Lieutenant-Colonel
- Units: No. 2 Squadron RFC; No. 70 Squadron RFC
- Commands: No. 19 Squadron RFC
- Awards: Distinguished Service Order; Military Cross
- Other work: Partner in Sanday & Co.

Lieutenant-Colonel William Douglas Stock Sanday, DSO, MC (born 1883) was a British World War I flying ace credited with five aerial victories.

== Early life and family background ==
Sanday was born in Woolton, Lancashire, the third and youngest son of Samuel Sanday, a corn merchant, and his first wife Annie Gertrude (née Stock). His uncle was the theologian the Reverend William Sanday (1843–1920), who was the Lady Margaret Professor of Divinity at Christ Church, Oxford.

On 26 February 1902 Sanday was commissioned as a second lieutenant in The Duke of Edinburgh's Own Edinburgh Royal Garrison Artillery, a unit of the Militia. He was promoted to lieutenant on 7 February 1903, but resigned his commission a year later, on 2 February 1904. In 1905 he married Mary Brodrick.

== World War I ==
Following the outbreak of the First World War Sanday learned to fly, being granted Royal Aero Club Aviators' Certificate No. 1295 on 2 June 1915 after soloing a Maurice Farman biplane at the Military School at Brooklands. He was commissioned as a second lieutenant on probation in the Royal Flying Corps the same day at the relatively advanced age of 32, and following further training was confirmed in his rank, and then appointed a flying officer on 7 August.

He was then posted to No. 2 Squadron to fly the B.E.2c two-seater. He gained his first aerial victory on 11 October when, in conjunction with two other aircraft, he and his observer Second Lieutenant Ellison, forced down a German Albatros two-seater at Noyelles-lès-Vermelles and captured the crew.

On 8 December he was appointed a flight commander with the acting rank of captain, and following an artillery spotting mission on 1 January 1916 was awarded the Military Cross. His citation read:

Second Lieutenant (Temporary Captain) William Douglas Stock Sanday, Royal Flying Corps, Special Reserve.

"For conspicuous gallantry and skill near Hulluch on 1 January 1916. He went out in a very high wind to observe the fire of a battery, and, owing to the clouds, was forced to fly at a height of between 800–900 feet (240–270 m). Although continually subjected to very heavy rifle fire from the German trenches, he enabled our battery to obtain several direct hits."

He was promoted to lieutenant on 7 January 1916, backdated to 1 December 1915, but was badly injured in a crash two days later on 9 January, finally returning to duty later in the year to serve as a flight commander in No. 70 Squadron, flying a Sopwith 1½ Strutter two-seater.

During July 1916 No. 70 Squadron carried out long-distance reconnaissance missions, and also acted as escort to the Martinsyde G.100 bombers of No. 27 Squadron, with which they shared the airfield at Fienvillers. Sanday was promoted to captain on 1 August, and on the evening on 6 August, he led a patrol which encountered a formation of ten German bomber aircraft near Bapaume. The British attacked, and fought the Germans all the way back to their own aerodrome, compelling them to land with their bombs still loaded. Sanday also shared in the forcing down of two Albatros Type C reconnaissance aircraft at Gouzeaucourt the same evening. A month later, on 6 September, Sanday was leading three aircraft in a reconnaissance of Cambrai and Busigny when they were attacked by enemy aircraft from Kampfstaffel 1. Sanday and Lieutenant Bernard Beanlands shared in the destruction of one aircraft, a Roland C.II over Élincourt, killing the pilot Wilhelm Fahlbusch and observer Hans Rosencrantz, and the others were driven off.

On 20 October 1916 Sanday was awarded the Distinguished Service Order in recognition of his service with No. 70 Squadron. His citation read:

Captain William Douglas Stock Sanday, MC.

"For conspicuous gallantry and skill. He has led over 35 patrols with great gallantry. On one occasion a machine of his formation was attacked, but he charged and brought down the enemy machine in flames. He has destroyed at least four enemy machines."

The next day, 21 October, Sanday was appointed a squadron commander with the acting rank of major, and following the death in action of Major D. H. Harvey-Kelly, Officer Commanding No. 19 Squadron, on 29 April 1917, Sanday was appointed to command. Flying a Spad VII single-seat fighter, he gained his fifth and final victory on 13 July, destroying a German reconnaissance aircraft over Lille. He finally left No. 19 Squadron on 19 March 1918, and on 21 March was appointed a wing commander with the acting rank of lieutenant colonel.

He was again appointed an acting-lieutenant colonel when appointed an air attaché and posted to the British Embassy at Madrid on 2 May 1919. On 1 August Sanday was granted a permanent commission in the RAF with the rank of major, but this was cancelled on 23 September, and he relinquished his commission owing to "ill-health contracted on active service" on 30 December 1919, but was granted the rank of lieutenant colonel.

== Post-war career ==
Sanday then joined his father and brothers as partners in the family firm of Sanday and Company, which his father had founded in the 1880s. During World War I it had become the largest grain export company operating in the United States, and served as the purchasing agent for the British government. By the end of 1923, when the partnership was dissolved, it had offices in London, Liverpool and Hull in England, Antwerp in Belgium, Karachi and Bombay in India, Buenos Aires and Rosario in Argentina, and New York, USA.

Soon afterwards, in February 1924, Sanday, then resident in Sloane Street, London, was declared bankrupt.
