= Josef Schwendemann =

- Born: 1888?
- Died: Unknown
- Military career
- Rank: Vizefeldwebel
- Units: Schutzstaffel 14, Jagdstaffel 41
- Awards: Military Merit Cross

Vizefeldwebel Josef Schwendemann was a World War I flying ace credited with 17 aerial victories.

== Biography ==
See also Aerial victory standards of World War I

Josef Schwendemann is believed to have been born in 1888.

Initially serving in the trenches early in World War I, and twice being wounded, Schwendemann transferred to Die Fliegertruppe (The Flying Troupe) in June 1916. He served with Schutzstaffel 14 from February 1917 before being sent to fighter school to become a pilot. He was posted to Jagdstaffel 41 in September. On the 19th, he shot down his first enemy. He would run off a string of 11 more victories by 25 July, the majority being opposing enemy fighters. He was then supplied with a new Fokker D.VII; he scored five more victories with it, though details have been lost. On 30 September 1918, he was honored Prussia's highest decoration for valor, the Golden Military Merit Cross.
