= Franz Walz =

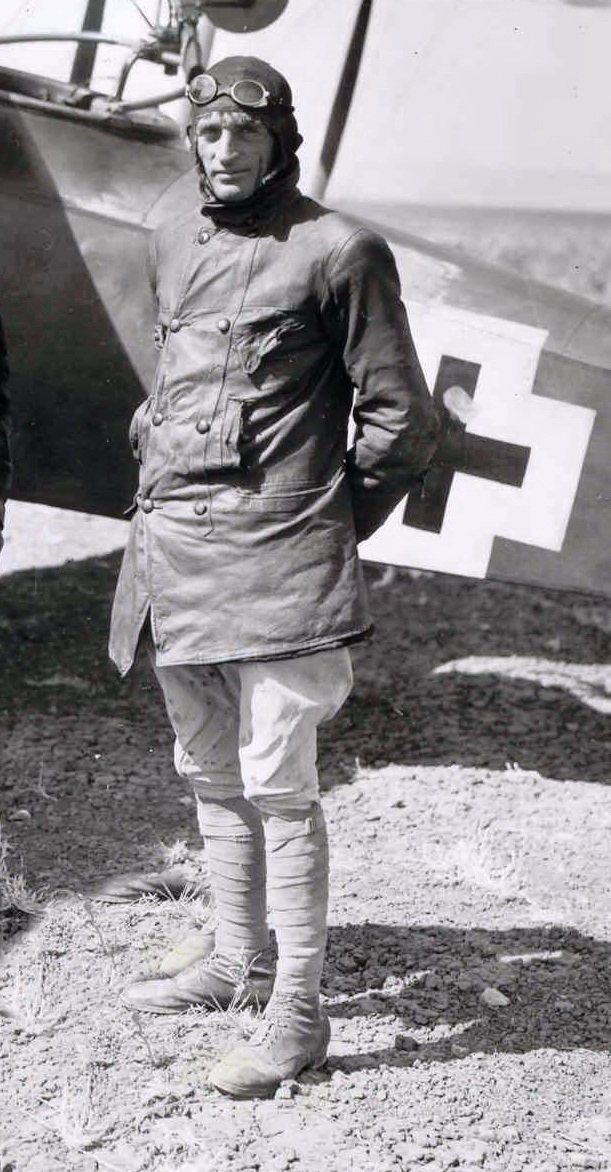
- Born: 4 December 1885; Speyer, Kingdom of Bavaria, the German Empire
- Died: 18 December 1945 (aged 60); Breslau, Silesia
- Military career
- Allegiance: German Empire; Nazi Germany
- Branch: Imperial German Army: Luftstreitkräfte; Luftwaffe
- Service years: 1905–1920; 1934–1945
- Rank: Generalleutnant
- Nickname: "Eagle of Jericho"
- Commands: Feldflieger Abteilung 3 Kampfstaffel 2 Jagdstaffel 19; Jagdstaffel 2 Jagdstaffel 34; Flieger-Abteilung 304
- Conflicts: World War I World War II
- Awards: Pour le Merite; Royal House Order of Hohenzollern; Iron Cross (both classes)
- Other work: Police officer

Generalleutnant Franz Walz (4 December 1885 – 18 December 1945) began his military career in the infantry in 1905. In 1912, he switched to aviation. He attained the rank of Hauptmann (Captain) while becoming a flying ace during World War I. He flew more than 500 combat sorties in Palestine and on the Western Front. He scored seven confirmed aerial victories in the latter theater. His later career led him to join the Luftwaffe during World War II. Toward the end of the war, he was captured by the Russians and died in one of their prison camps in December 1945.

== Biography ==
Franz Walz was born in Speyer, Kingdom of Bavaria, the German Empire on 4 December 1885. He enlisted for military service with Bavaria's 8th Infantry Regiment on 15 July 1905. In 1908, he was promoted to Leutnant. Walz learned to fly before the First World War, having transferred to aviation in 1912.

== First World War ==
When the war began, Walz was the commander of Feldflieger Abteilung 3 (Field Flier Detachment 3). In November 1914, he was promoted to Oberleutnant.

On 30 December 1915, he took command of Kampfstaffel 2 (Tactical Bomber Squadron 2). He became one of the few German two-seater aces, scoring his first aerial victory on 9 April 1916, and his sixth on 29 July 1916. On 30 July, he was wounded in the foot.

On 5 September 1916, having already received both classes of the Iron Cross, Franz Walz received the House Order of Hohenzollern. On 3 November, he was assigned to command a fighter squadron, Jagdstaffel 19. On 29 November, he was transferred to command of Jagdstaffel 2.

Walz was promoted to Hauptmann on 20 January 1917. On 14 May 1917, he shot down William Curphey and his Airco DH.2. On 9 June, Walz was posted to command of Jagdstaffel 34. However, Walz was found lacking as a leader of fighter pilots, and on 25 August 1917 was transferred from France on the Western Front to the Middle East to command Flieger-Abteilung 304 (Flier Detachment 304). Here he became known as "The Eagle of Jericho".

On 22 July 1918, the Ottoman Empire awarded Franz Walz its Silver Liakat Medal. On 9 August 1918, despite his low aerial victory score, he was awarded the Pour le Merite for prolonged service in command. By this time, he had flown over 500 combat sorties.

The Turkish award of the Order of Osmanieh Fourth Class with Swords followed on 15 September 1918. By this time, Walz had also been granted three decorations by his native Kingdom of Bavaria, as well as another from their Austro-Hungarian allies.

On 20 September 1918, Walz fell into British captivity. He was released after war's end, on 1 December 1919.

== Post-World War I ==
Franz Walz served with both the Reichswehr and the State Police. Once the Luftwaffe was established, Walz returned to aviation duty and ascended in rank. On 1 April 1941, he became a Generalleutnant. Later in World War II, he would be captured by the Soviets. He died as a prisoner of war in Breslau, Silesia on 18 December 1945.
