= Walter Kypke =

- Born: 22 September 1893; Stettin
- Died: 6 June 1924 (aged 30); Magdeburg
- Military career
- Allegiance: Germany
- Branch: Aviation
- Service years: 1914–1918
- Rank: Leutnant
- Units: FFA 2, FFA 57, KEK Avillers, Jasta 14, Jasta 41
- Commands: Kest 5, Jasta 47
- Awards: Knight's Cross with Swords of the Royal House Order of Hohenzollern, Iron Cross First Class

Leutnant Walter Kypke (22 September 1893—6 June 1924) HOH, IC was an early military aviator in the predecessor to the Luftwaffe, the Luftstreitkräfte. This itinerant flying ace accumulated nine official aerial victories, which were scored in four of the seven flying units with which he served; the wins were spread over a three-year period. Kypke served for the entirety of World War I, rising to command during his final year of combat.

== Military service ==
Kypke volunteered for ground service at the start of World War I. In April 1915, he began pilot's training. During the remainder of 1915, he served in a couple of artillery cooperation units, first in FFA 2, then in FFA 57. In February 1916, as aerial combat came into being, Kypke transferred to an ad hoc unit formed for the new circumstances, KEK Avillers. In August, he scored his first aerial victory while the Fokker Scourge was beginning. He then had a fleeting assignment to Jasta 14, before moving on to Jasta 41. On 3 September 1917, he scored his second win, downing a Salmson over Rodern for Jasta 41's first victory. He followed that with a Sopwith 1½ Strutter over Colmar on the 16th. A month later, on 16 October 1917, he scored twice, shooting down enemy airplanes on mid-day and afternoon patrols, and became an ace. On 27 October, he was transferred to temporarily command another ad hoc unit, Kest 5. While leading them, he notched win number six by destroying a Nieuport over Hagenbach on 5 November 1917. He left this command on 6 December; on the day after Christmas, he assumed command as the Staffelführer of Jasta 47. Kypke would score three more times while leading this squadron from the front–a Royal Aircraft Factory RE.8 on 12 April 1918 over Merris, another RE.8 on 25 May 1918, and a Spad on 16 July 1918.

== Death ==
Walter Kypke survived World War I with the Royal House Order of Hohenzollern and the First Class award of the Iron Cross. He was killed in an airplane crash on 6 June 1924 at Magdeburg.
