= Bernhard Ultsch =

- Born: 26 March 1898; Wunsiedel near Bayreuth, Bavaria
- Died: Unknown
- Military career
- Allegiance: German Empire
- Branch: Artillery, Imperial German Air Service
- Rank: Offizierstellvertreter
- Units: 3rd Bavarian Reserve Artillerie Regiment, Schutzstaffel 29, Jagdstaffel 39, Jagdstaffel 77
- Awards: Iron Cross; Military Merit Cross, Medal for Bravery

Offizierstellvertreter Bernhard Ultsch (born 26 March 1898, date of death unknown) was a World War I flying ace credited with twelve aerial victories.

== Early life ==
Bernhard Ultsch was born in Wunsiedel, Bavaria, the German Empire on 26 March 1898.

== Military service ==
Ultsch volunteered for service in the artillery when World War I began. During his service with them, he won the Iron Cross Second Class and a promotion to Unteroffizier. He then transferred to aviation, beginning Fliegerschule 2 at Neustadt on 19 September 1916. His first assignment was to Schutzstaffel 29 to fly two-seaters. There he received his pilot's badge on 18 June 1917, along with his native Bavaria's Military Merit Cross Third Class with Swords. He scored his first three victories there, on 24 and 29 July, and on 4 September. On 9 September, he was reassigned to fly fighters for Jagdstaffel 39 in Italy. He received the Iron Cross First Class on 22 September. During October and November 1917, he scored five more wins. He was also promoted again, to Vizefeldwebel, on 28 October. On 31 December, he was awarded the Austro-Hungarian Silver Bravery Medal.

In February 1918, he was transferred back to the Western Front and stationed with Jagdstaffel 77. He had a couple of unconfirmed wins in March, followed by a couple that were confirmed. Then, on 5 May, he was wounded in action, and off duty until 22 August. He came back for two last wins in September 1918. Also during September, he was awarded the Bavarian Military Merit Cross Second Class with Swords.
