= Wilhelm Hippert =

World War I flying ace

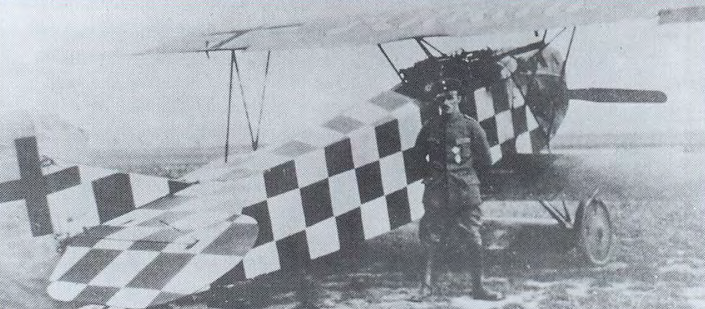
- Wilhelm Hippert and his Fokker D.VII "Mimmi"
- Born: Unknown
- Died: Unknown
- Military career
- Allegiance: Germany
- Branch: Luftstreitkräfte
- Service years: 1917-1918
- Rank: Offizierstellvertreter
- Nickname: "Willi"
- Units: Feldflieger Abteilung (Field Flier Detachment) 227; Jasta 39; Jasta 74
- Awards: Iron Cross

Offizierstellvertreter Wilhelm Hippert IC was a World War I flying ace credited with eight confirmed aerial victories.

== World War I aerial service ==
Wilhelm "Willi" Hippert was originally assigned as a two-seater aircraft pilot with Feldflieger Abteilung (Field Flier Detachment) 227. He and his observer were credited with an aerial victory on 17 March 1917, when they shot down a Royal Aircraft Factory FE.2d from No. 20 Squadron RFC over Lomme.

Hippert was transferred to a fighter squadron, Jagdstaffel 39 later in 1917 as a Vizefeldwebel, and thus ended up flying combat over the Battle of Caporetto in northern Italy in a Fokker D.Va he dubbed "Mimmi". On 2 October 1917, he scored his second aerial victory, downing an Italian Savoia Pomilio at 1510 hours. After additional victories on 25 October and 30 November, he became an ace on 8 December 1917. He would tally one more victory with Jasta 39, on 11 January 1918.

On 5 March 1918, Hippert was transferred back to the Western Front. He joined a night fighter squadron, Jagdstaffel 74. In mid 1918, he was promoted to Offizierstellvertreter. By this time, Hippert was flying a Fokker D.VII with a black and white checkerboard pattern on the fuselage, a blue nose, and the name "Mimmi" emblazoned on the top wing. On 7 June 1918, he shot down a Dorand AR2 over Beaumont-sur-Vesle for his seventh victory. On 22 August, he claimed two French bombers, a Caudron R.11 and a Breguet 14, though he was only credited with the former.

At some point during the war, Wilhelm Hippert won the Iron Cross.
