= August Delling =

German World War I flying ace

- Born: 19 October 1895; Braunetsrieth, Kingdom of Bavaria, German Empire
- Died: 17 June 1962 (aged 66); Battenberg
- Military career
- Allegiance: Germany
- Branch: Artillery; aviation
- Service years: 1914-1918
- Rank: Leutnant
- Unit: Jagdstaffel 34
- Awards: Military Merit Order; Iron Cross

Leutnant August Delling was a German World War I flying ace credited with five aerial victories.

== Early life and service in artillery ==
On 19 October 1895, August Delling was born on a farm at Braunetsrieth in northeastern Bavaria. As World War I began, Delling joined the Bavarian artillery service in August 1914. By September, he was an Unteroffizier. On 1 September 1916, he was commissioned as a Leutnant and placed in command of an artillery unit.

== World War I aerial service ==
On 25 June 1917, Delling transferred to the Luftstreitkräfte (German Air Service). He underwent pilot's training at the Bavarian Jastaschule 2 in Furth. Upon graduation, on 16 March 1918 he was posted direct to a fighter squadron, Royal Bavarian Jagdstaffel 34. In accordance with German custom, Delling was allowed to mark his own Albatros D.V, serial numbered D.4483/17. Over the basic silvery white of the fuselage went a light red wash from nose to cockpit, with the same red in a wide band around the fuselage. Wings remained standard five-color lozenge camouflage. The tailplane maintained its stock coloring of green and lavender on top, but the undersides were light blue and the rudder was painted white. Delling is also known to have operated a third or fourth hand Fokker Dr.I triplane, though probably without his personal markings.

Between 6 April and 23 June 1918, Delling was credited with five confirmed aerial victories, but denied confirmation on a sixth credited to an anti-aircraft unit. On 3 August 1918, Delling left combat duty with Jasta 34 because of ill health. He would recoup to fly again as an instructor at Bavaria's Fliegerersatz-Abteilung (Replacement Detachment) 2.

== Post World War I ==
August Delling survived the war and went on to become a director of the firm of Huecke and Buhren. He died on 17 June 1962 in Battenberg.

== Honors and awards ==
- Kingdom of Bavaria's Military Merit Order (Fourth Class with Swords)
- Iron Cross Second and First Class.
