= Rudolf Matthaei =

German flying ace

- Born: 10 November 1895; Hildesheim
- Died: 17 April 1918 (aged 22)
- Military career
- Allegiance: Germany
- Branch: Artillery; infantry; aviation
- Rank: Lieutenant
- Units: Kasta 9; Jasta 21; Jasta 5
- Commands: Jasta 5; Jasta 46
- Awards: Iron Cross First and Second Class

Leutnant Rudolf Matthaei (10 November 1895 – 17 April 1918) was a German World War I flying ace credited with ten aerial victories.

== Early life ==
Rudolf Matthaei was born in Hildesheim, Saxony, on 10 November 1895.

== Military service ==
Matthaei joined Saxon Field Artillery Regiment No. 46 as an officer candidate on 13 February 1914. His first wartime service was in France. He was commissioned on 23 April 1915. He shipped out with his regiment to the Eastern Front. After a transfer to Infantry Regiment No. 79, Matthaei returned to France in September 1915. In early 1916, he began aviation training. He was assigned to Kasta 9 on 12 October 1916. He upgraded to fighter pilot at Valenciennes during the first two months of 1917. In late February, he was posted to Jagdstaffel 21. On 24 March 1917, he shot down an observation balloon for his first victory. After an unconfirmed claim on 15 April, he shot down a second balloon on 30 April. By 22 November 1917, he had a string of nine victories credited to Jasta 21, even though he had been posted to Jagdstaffel 5 in June and become its temporary commander in August. On 17 December, he was promoted to command of Jagdstaffel 46. On 21 February, he capped his career with his tenth win, when he shot down a Spad over Wavrin.

On 17 April, he spun in, crashed, and burned on his home airfield. He was pulled alive from the wreckage, but died later that night. He had been awarded both classes of the Iron Cross, as well as the Brunswick State War Service Cross.
