= Jagdstaffel 47 =

Jasta 47
- Active: 1917–1918
- Country: Kingdom of Württemberg, German Empire
- Branch: Luftstreitkräfte
- Type: Fighter squadron
- Engagements: World War I

Royal Württemberg Jagdstaffel 47, commonly abbreviated to Jasta 47 or Jasta 47W, was a "hunting group" (i.e., fighter squadron) of the Luftstreitkräfte, the air arm of the Imperial German Army during World War I. Incomplete records credit the squadron with 14 aerial victories during the war. The unit's known casualties include three killed in action, one injured in a flying accident, three wounded in action, and one taken prisoner of war.

== History ==
Jasta 47 was formed at Flieger-Abteilung ("Flier Detachment") 10, Böblingen, Kingdom of Württemberg, on 16 December 1917. It was forwarded into action on the 24th. Its first combat sorties came on 6 March 1918, with its first aerial victory on 11 March 1918. The squadron would be assigned to at least five Jagdgruppes during its existence. There are no records of squadron victories after 16 July 1918, nor of casualties suffered after 24 September 1918. Nevertheless, Jasta 47 did serve through war's end.

== Commanding officers (Staffelführer) ==
1. Walter Kypke: 26 December 1917 – 11 November 1918.

== Duty stations ==
1. Harelbeke, Belgium: 24 December 1917
2. Roeselare, Belgium: 9 March 1918
3. Faches-Thumesnil, France: 29 March 1918
4. Lomme, France: 5 May 1918
5. Faches-Thumesnil, France: 30 May 1918
6. Ennemain, France: 6 June 1918
7. Sainte-Marie-à-Py, France: 9 July 1918
8. Chémery
9. Medard, Germany

== Operations ==
Jasta 47 left Boblingen for Harlebeke on 24 December, when it was posted to support of 4 Armee. On the 29th, the squadron was incorporated into Jagdgruppe 4. After flying its initial combat sorties on 6 March, on the 9th the Jasta was transferred to Jagdgruppe 6. After scoring its first aerial victory on 11 March, on the 29th it was moved to become part of Jagdgruppe 3 supporting 6 Armee. On 5 May 1918, Jasta 47 returned to 4 Armee's control. On 6 June, it became part of Jagdgruppe 9. On 9 July 1918, it was posted to support of 3 Armee.
