= Georg Schlenker =

World War I flying ace

- Military career
- Allegiance: Germany
- Branch: Imperial German Air Service
- Rank: Leutnant
- Unit: FEA 7, Kagohl 4, Jagdstaffel 3
- Commands: Jagdstaffel 41
- Awards: Royal House Order of Hohenzollern, Iron Cross

Leutnant Georg Schlenker was a World War I flying ace credited with 14 aerial victories.

== World War I military service ==
Schlenker had enlisted in the German army before World War I started. He was promoted to Vizewachmeister on 3 August 1914. After transfer to aviation, he was posted to FEA 7 on 8 July 1915. He was then assigned to Kagohl 4 on 28 December 1915. He was commissioned an officer, and assigned to Royal Prussian Jagdstaffel 3 on 1 September 1916. Beginning 7 January 1918, and running three months to 8 April 1917, Schlenker scored seven victories. On 6 September 1917, he was transferred to command Royal Prussian Jagdstaffel 41. Between 16 October 1917 and 18 April 1918, he scored seven more times. He then had a drought of wins. On 30 September 1918, he was wounded so severely he did not return to duty before war's end.
