= Otto Creutzmann =

- Born: 8 January 1892; Spickendorf, Saalkreis, Province of Saxony, Kingdom of Prussia, German Empire
- Died: 12 January 1943 (aged 51); Proskurov, Ukrainian SSR, Soviet Union
- Military career
- Allegiance: German Empire; Nazi Germany
- Branch: Imperial German Army; Luftstreitkräfte; Luftwaffe
- Service years: 1914–1918 –1943
- Rank: Leutnant d. R. (WWI); Oberstleutnant d. R. (WWII)
- Units: Kampfgeschwader (Tactical Bombing Wing) 2, Kampfstaffel (Tactical Bomber Squadron) 23, Jagdstaffel 20, Kampfeinsitzerstaffel (Combat Single-seater Squadron) 4, Jagdstaffel 43
- Commands: Jagdstaffel 46
- Awards: Iron Cross Second and First Classes; Kingdom of Saxony's Albert Order (Knight Second Class); Knight's Cross of the Military Order of Saint Henry; Knight's Cross of the House Order of Hohenzollern with Swords
- Other work: Lord of the manor (Gutspächter auf Tilleda)

Otto Creutzmann (8 January 1892 – 12 January 1943) was a World War I flying ace credited with eight aerial victories.

== Early life and ground service ==
Otto Creutzmann was born in Spickendorf Halle an der Salle on 8 January 1892. He joined the German army in 1914, as World War I began. He saw ground combat until June 1915, when he was wounded by shellfire. He then joined the Die Fliegertruppen des deutschen Kaiserreiches (Imperial German Air Service).

== Aerial service ==
Creutzmann began his flying service with Kampfgeschwader (Tactical Bombing Wing) 2. He transferred to Staffel 33, then moved on to Kampfstaffel (Tactical Bomber Squadron) 23 of Kampfgeschwader (Tactical Bombing Wing) 4. One of Creutzmann's observers in this assignment was Lothar von Richthofen. Creutzmann was awarded the Kingdom of Saxony's Albert Order on 1 December 1916.

On 6 February 1917, he transferred to Jagdstaffel 20. On 11 July 1917, he shot down an Airco DH.4 from No. 57 Squadron RFC over Ledgehem, Belgium for his first aerial victory. On 12 August 1917, he was forwarded to Kampfeinsitzerstaffel (Combat Single-seater Squadron) 4.

On 20 February 1918, Creutzmann transferred yet again, to Jagdstaffel 43. He suffered a slight wound in May. He stayed until 13 June, upgrading to flying a Fokker Dr.I Triplane while with the squadron. He was then promoted to command as a Staffelführer, and scored his last three victories with his Fokker D.VII while commanding Royal Prussian Jagdstaffel 46. On 19 July 1918, he was presented the Military Order of St. Henry. He headed Jasta 46 until the end of the war.

== World War II ==
Otto Creutzmann served as an Oberstleutnant in the Luftwaffe during the Second World War and was severely wounded on 10 January 1943 on the Eastern Front (Flugplatz Proskurow) on the way to the Zerstörergeschwader 1, where he was to take over the II. Gruppe. He died on 12 January 1943 at the war hospital Reserve-Kriegslazarett 15/VI Proskurow.
