= Reinhold Jörke =

- Born: Johann Friedrich Reinhold Jörke; 29 July 1893; Klein Leuthen, Brandenburg, Prussia
- Died: 8 November 1944 (aged 51); Budapest, Hungary
- Military career
- Allegiance: Germany
- Branch: Aviation
- Rank: Offiziersstellvertreter (Warrant Officer)
- Units: Jagdstaffel 12, Jagdstaffel 13, Jagdstaffel 39
- Awards: Iron Cross First Class

OStv Johann Friedrich Reinhold Jörke (29 July 1893 – 8 November 1944) was a German World War I flying ace credited with 14 confirmed aerial victories.

== Biography ==
He was posted to the Royal Prussian Jagdstaffel 12 on 27 February 1917, and scored his first victory with them on 24 March 1917 by downing British ace Cyril Lowe. Jörke had run up nine victories by 18 September 1917. He then switched to the Royal Prussian Jagdstaffel 13, and scored a single win, his tenth, with them, on 21 February 1918. In June 1918, he was posted to the Royal Prussian Jagdstaffel 39 as it returned from Italy. He lasted out the war with them, scoring four more victories in August and September 1918.

During the Second World War, he was killed in Budapest while serving as a military police officer for Nazi Germany.

== Aerial victories ==
Doubled dividing lines in list denote Jörke's change of squadrons.

| No. | Date/time | Foe | Location | Notes |
|---|---|---|---|---|
| 1 | 24 March 1917 @ 1030 hours | Royal Aircraft Factory FE.2b | Croisselles | No. 11 Squadron RFC loss |
| 2 | 22 April 1917 @ 2010 hours | SPAD | West of Havrincourt | No. 23 Squadron RFC loss |
| 3 | 26 May 1917 @ 2015 hours | Sopwith Pup | Etaing | No. 66 Squadron RFC loss |
| 4 | 3 June 1917 @ 1750 hours | Royal Aircraft Factory FE.2b | Epehy | |
| 5 | 20 August 1917 @ 0920 hours | Sopwith 1½ Strutter | Vitry | No. 43 Squadron RFC loss |
| 6 | 5 September 1917 @ 1945 hours | Sopwith Camel | West of Lens | |
| 7 | 16 September 1917 @ 1415 hours | Sopwith Pup | Monchy | No. 46 Squadron RFC loss |
| 8 | 17 September 1917 @ 0700 hours | Either Airco DH.5 or Sopwith Pup | Feuchy | |
| 9 | 18 September 1917 @ 1105 hours | Airco DH.5 | Moeuvres | No. 41 Squadron RFC loss |
| 10 | 21 February 1918 | Royal Aircraft Factory SE.5a | Reneuil Ferme | |
| 11 | 19 August 1918 @ 1050 hours | Bristol F.2b | Arras | |
| 12 | 29 August 1918 @ 0745 hours | Bristol F.2b | Beauraignes | |
| 13 | 2 September 1918 @ 1125 hours | Royal Aircraft Factory RE.8 | Baillieu | No. 6 Squadron RAF loss |
| 14 | 15 September 1918 @ 1745 hours | Royal Aircraft Factory SE.5a | | No. 56 Squadron RAF loss |
