= Helmut Steinbrecher =

- Born: 30 June 1896; Dresden, Kingdom of Saxony
- Died: Unknown
- Military career
- Allegiance: Germany
- Branch: Aviation
- Rank: Leutnant
- Units: Flieger-Abteilung 17 (Flight Detachment 17), Flieger-Abteilung (Artillerie) 274 (Flight Detachment (Artillery) 274, Jagdstaffel 46
- Awards: Iron Cross 1st and 2nd Class

Leutnant Helmut Steinbrecher was the first pilot in history to successfully parachute from a stricken airplane, on 27 June 1918. He was a World War I flying ace credited with five aerial victories.

== Biography ==
Helmut Steinbrecher was born in Dresden, Germany on 30 June 1896.

Steinbrecher enlisted in the German military on 20 August 1914, and was posted to a Jaeger battalion. He was sent into action on the Western Front in 1915, only to be transferred to Galilee in 1916. After selection for pilot's training in February, 1917, he qualified as a pilot and was assigned first to Flieger-Abteilung 17 (Flight Detachment 17) to fly two-seaters for reconnaissance duty, then subsequently to Flieger-Abteilung (Artillerie) 274 (Flight Detachment (Artillery) 274 as an artillery spotter.

On 25 December 1917, he was picked to undergo further training as a fighter pilot. After completing that course, he was assigned to Jagdstaffel 46 on 12 March 1918. He shot down his first British airplane that same day, a Royal Aircraft Factory SE.5a. A second followed on 31 May.

On 27 June 1918, his Pfalz D.III was set afire during a dogfight with a Sopwith Camel piloted by Captain Edward Barfort Drake. He survived by bailing out, in the first known use of a parachute in military history.

In his combat report he wrote

“Up to that time I had been a Doubting Thomas in the matter of parachutes. I had been under the impression that baling out with a parachute from a single-seater would be only rarely successful. And I did not know exactly what I had to do to get out of the plane. But in the moment when the flames licked my face, I did know at once what to do!”

He subsequently wrote to the manufacturer:

“The thing functioned very well. I congratulate you on the splendid success of your parachute. I am carrying it ever since that flight and do not want to fly with oi any more. As far as I know this was the first time that a parachute was used under actual wartime conditions and that it was used for a jump from a single-seater to boot. Congratulations once again on your excellent parachute.”

He had used a parachute manufactured by Schroeder company of Berlin to the designs of Otto Heinecke, which the German air service had introduced in the spring of 1918, becoming the world's first air service to introduce a standard parachute.

Three days later, he downed a Sopwith Camel for his third win.

Steinbrecher would shoot down two more enemy airplanes to become an ace. He was awarded both classes of the Iron Cross.
