= Friedrich Huffzky =

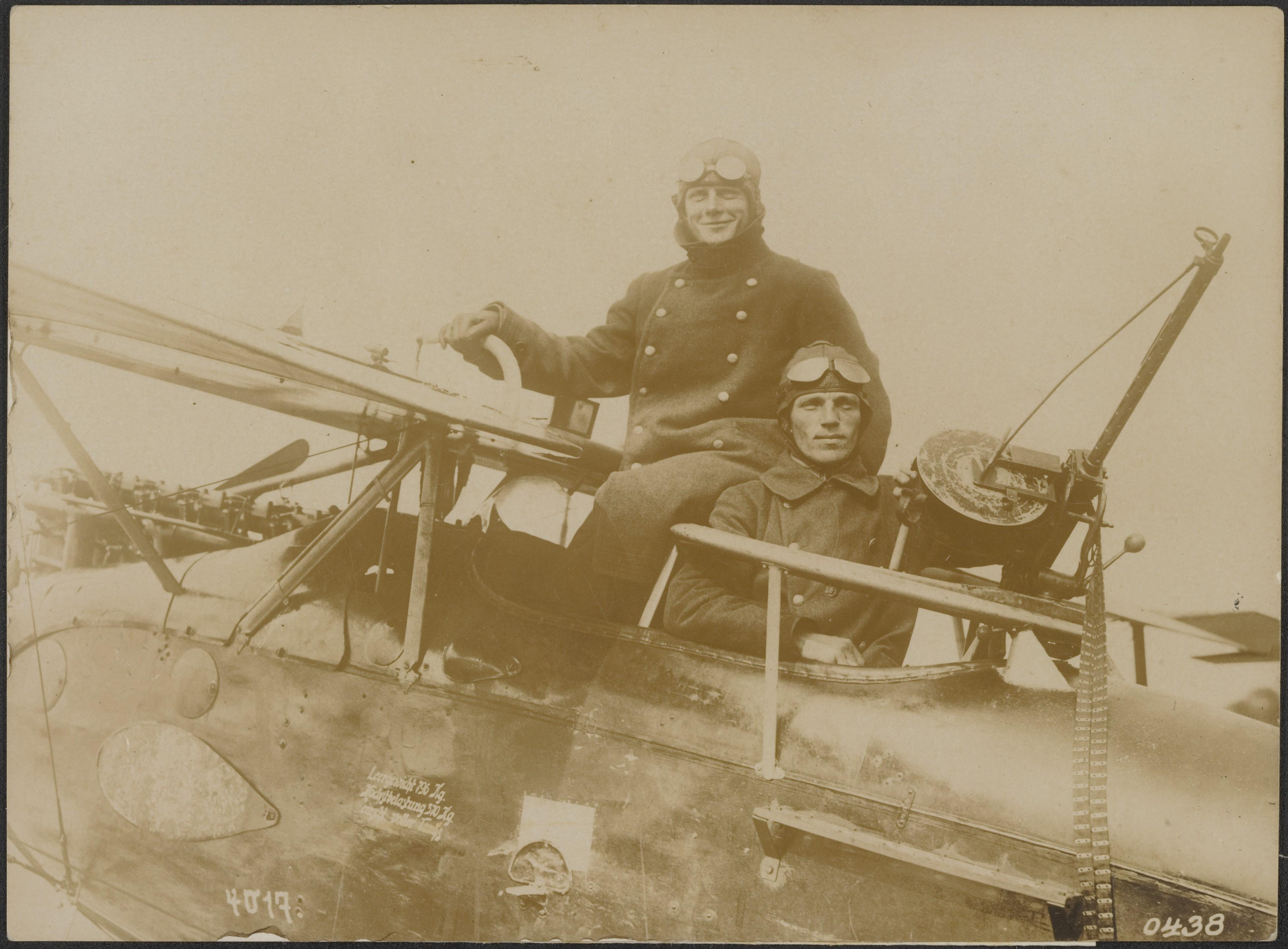
- Born: Unknown
- Died: Unknown
- Military career
- Allegiance: Germany
- Branch: Aviation
- Rank: Feldwebel
- Unit: Schlachstaffel 15 of the Luftstreitkräfte
- Awards: Iron Cross First and Second Class

Feldwebel Friedrich Huffzky was a German flying ace during World War I. He was the pilot of the most successful two-seater German fighter crew of the war, scoring nine confirmed aerial victories.

== World War I service ==
Friedrich Huffzky is known to have been assigned to Schlachtstaffel 15 of the Luftstreitkräfte in early 1918 as a Vizefeldwebel. He piloted a Halberstadt CL.II escort fighter. Teamed with Gottfried Ehmann, an experienced gunner who already had three victories verified, Huffzky began his victory streak on 4 June 1918. By 29 July 1918, he had run his string to nine confirmed victories; in the process, Ehmann was credited with a total of 12 wins and became the most successful German gunner of the war. Huffzky was awarded both classes of the Iron Cross for his efforts, as well as a promotion to Feldwebel.
