= Paul Strähle =

German ace pilot in World War 1

- Born: 20 May 1893; Schorndorf, Kingdom of Württemberg
- Died: 8 May 1985 (aged 91)
- Allegiance: German Empire
- Branch: Infantry; aviation
- Rank: Leutnant
- Unit: Flieger-Abteilung (Artillerie) 213, Jagdstaffel 18
- Commands: Jagdstaffel 57
- Conflicts: World War 1
- Awards: Royal House Order of Hohenzollern; Iron Cross
- Other work: Served as a Major in the Reserves during World War II

Leutnant Paul Strähle was a German World War I flying ace credited with 15 aerial victories.

== Early life and infantry service ==
Paul Strähle was born on 20 May 1893 in Schorndorf, Kingdom of Wurttemberg

He originally served in the infantry after joining the German army on 1 October 1913. He transferred to aviation and was appointed to pilot training in 1915. He first flew in an artillery cooperation unit, being posted to Flieger-Abteilung (Artillerie) 213 on 15 July 1916. Beginning 5 September, he trained on fighters.

== Service as a fighter pilot ==
He was then assigned to Jagdstaffel 18 on 27 October 1916. He scored his first aerial victory on 14 February 1917, shooting down a Royal Aircraft Factory F.E.2b; his victim is believed to have been Harold Hartney. He continued his victory streak, flying an Albatros D.V in the squadron colors of blue and scarlet with his personal album of a white battle axe painted on its side. He flew with Jagdstaffel 18 until 26 May 1917, when he won his seventh victory. The Royal House Order of Hohenzollern was awarded to him on 9 August 1917.

== In command ==
Strähle was then appointed to command a new squadron just forming; Jagdstaffel 57 was founded at Königsberg on 6 January 1918, and moved to the Sixth Army front on the 24th. He took his Albatros fighter with him from Jasta 18, along with two experienced pilots to lead his crew of greenhorns. After a lapse of almost a year, he won again on 17 April 1918. This streak of eight more triumphs ended with a double victory on 29 August 1918. He was wounded in action on 27 September 1918, and did not score after that.

== After the war ==
Strähle stayed in aviation after the war. He acquired at least one Halberstadt CL.IV rigged for aerial photography and ran an aerial photography business venture from 1919. By 14 July 1921, he was reported to be running a pioneering air mail service between Stuttgart and Constance, using three of the Halberstadts, one of which could also carry passengers, under the name Luftverkehr Strähle.

== Legacy ==
His archive of 40,000 aerial photos still exists today. His four Halberstadt CL.IVs have been restored and are on display in Germany and the United States. One is displayed at the Deutsches Technikmuseum, Berlin, Germany, another is displayed at the Militärhistorisches Museum Flugplatz Berlin-Gatow, while a third is on display at the Steven F. Udvar-Hazy Center, Chantilly, Virginia, and a fourth is restored and on display in the National Museum of the United States Air Force. It is a rarity, being a combat veteran, and one of the few built by L.F.G Roland.
