= Wasdow =

- Ortsteil of Behren-Lübchin
- Interactive map of Wasdow
- Location within Germany Location within Mecklenburg-Vorpommern
- Coordinates: 54°00′N 12°46′E
- Country: Germany
- State: Mecklenburg-Vorpommern
- District: Rostock
- Municipality: Behren-Lübchin

Area
  - Total: 26.06 km^{2} (10.06 sq mi)
- Elevation: 15 m (49 ft)

Population (2010-12-31)
  - Total: 392
  - Density: 15.0/km^{2} (39.0/sq mi)
- Time zone: UTC+01:00 (CET)
  - Summer (DST): UTC+02:00 (CEST)
- Postal codes: 17179
- Dialling codes: 039971
- Vehicle registration: GÜ
- Website: www.amt-gnoien.de

Wasdow is a village and a former municipality in the district of Rostock, in Mecklenburg-Vorpommern, Germany. Since 5 September 2005, it is part of the municipality Behren-Lübchin.

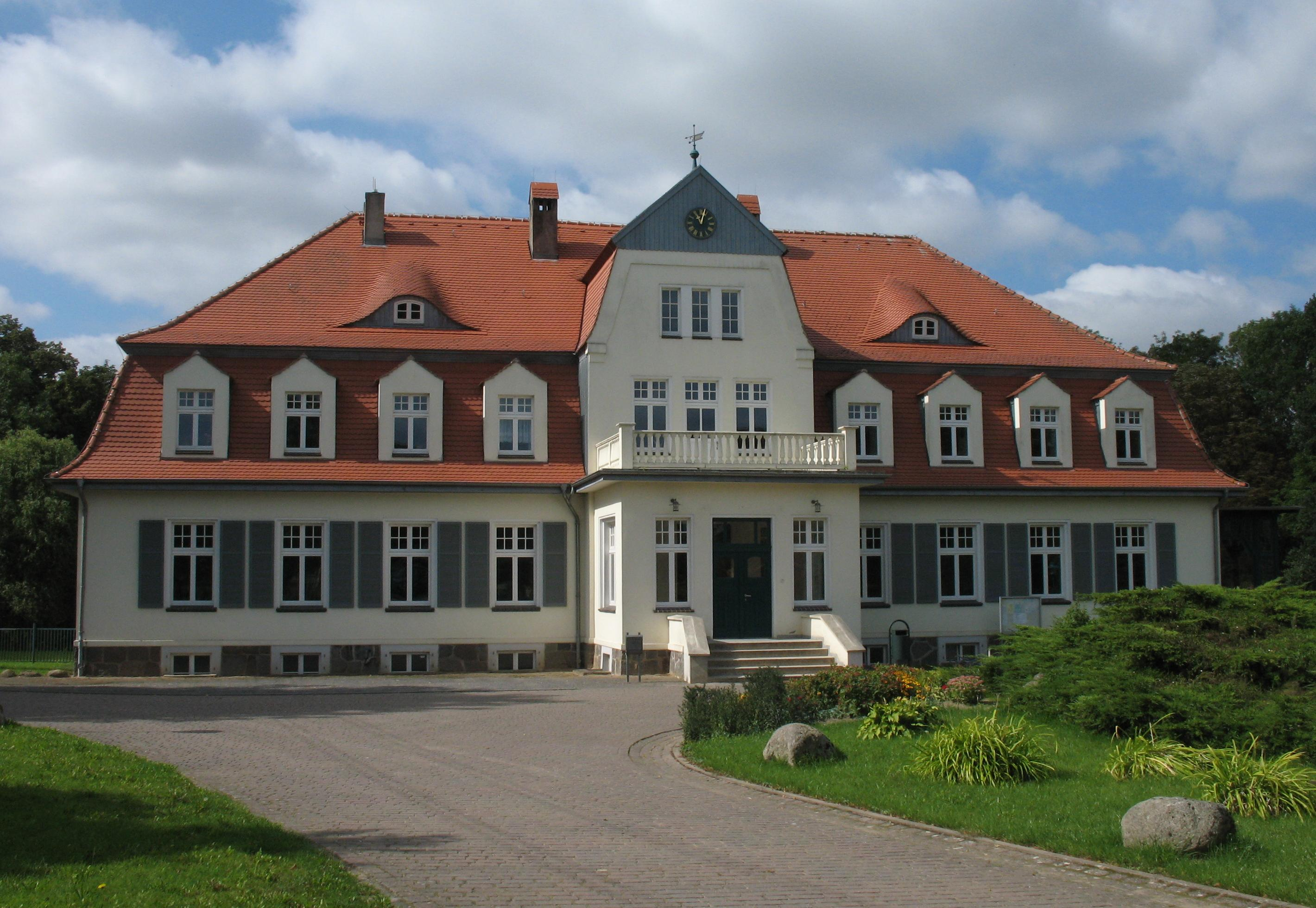
Manor

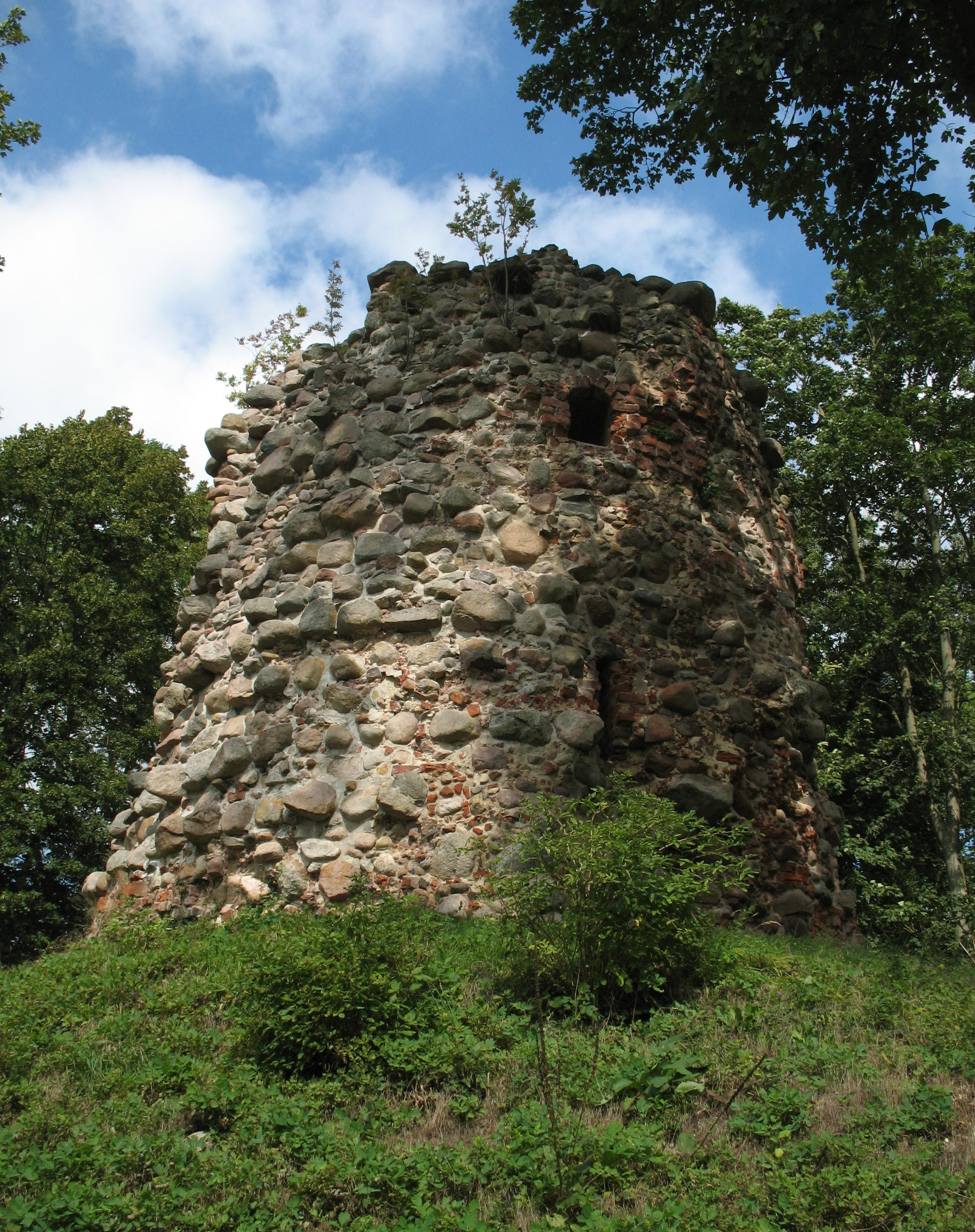
Bergfried
