= Paul Hüttenrauch =

- Born: Unknown
- Died: Unknown
- Military career
- Allegiance: Germany
- Branch: Aviation
- Rank: Unteroffizier
- Unit: Jagdstaffel 7
- Awards: Iron Cross First Class

Unteroffizier Paul Hüttenrauch was a World War I flying ace credited with eight aerial victories.

== Biography ==
Paul Hüttenrauch first came to notice in February 1918, flying a Fokker D.VII for a fighter squadron, Jagdstaffel 7. He was wounded in action on 15 February, and again on 14 May 1918. He scored his first aerial victory at 1015 hours on 20 July 1918, when he shot down a Sopwith Camel from No. 70 Squadron RAF north of Ypres. On an evening sortie, he shot down another Camel from No. 204 Squadron RAF at 2040 hours 31 July over Hooglede. On 13 August 1918, he destroyed a Royal Aircraft Factory SE.5a south of Zuydschoote.

The Jasta 7 records credit Paul Hüttenrauch with eight victories by 14 October 1918, though they lack details for the last five wins. Hüttenrauch was awarded the First Class Iron Cross, which by regulation followed a prior award of the Second Class.
