= Jagdstaffel 39 =

German WWI fighter squadron

Jasta 39
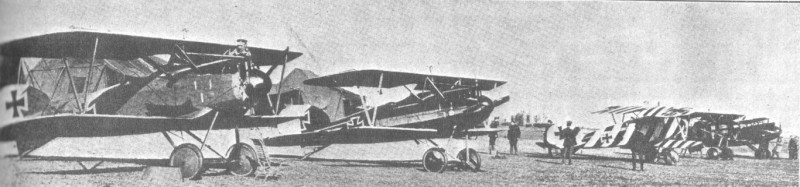
- The Jasta 39 flight line in Italy, 1917
- Active: 1917–1918
- Country: German Empire
- Branch: Luftstreitkräfte
- Type: Fighter squadron
- Engagements: World War I • Western Front • Italian Front

Royal Prussian Jagdstaffel 39, commonly abbreviated to Jasta 39, was a "hunting group" (i.e., fighter squadron) of the Luftstreitkräfte, the air arm of the Imperial German Army during World War I. The unit would score 68 aerial victories during the war, including 14 observation balloons downed. The squadron's victories came at the expense of seven pilots killed in action, one killed in a flying accident, five wounded in action, and one taken prisoner of war.

== History ==
Jasta 39 was founded on 30 June 1917 at Fliegerersatz-Abteilung (Replacement Detachment) 15, Hannover, Germany. It held its first formation 2 August 1917, under its original commander, Karl August Raben. It would serve until war's end, when the Luftstreitkräfte was disbanded.

== Commanding officers (Staffelführer) ==
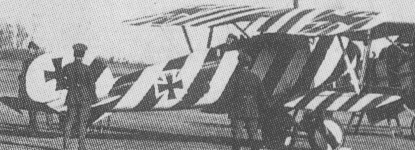
Albatros D.III of Josef Loeser.

1. August Raben: 2 August 1917 (to Jasta 15 as Staffelführer on 14 March 1918)
2. Franz von Kerssenbrock: 17 November 1917
3. Josef Loeser: 4 December 1917
4. Johann Hesselink: 4 April 1918

== Duty stations ==
1. Hannover, Germany: 30 June 1917
2. Ensisheim: 2 August 1917
3. Campoformido, Italy:
4. San Giacomo, Italy
5. Roveredo, Italy
6. Cervada, Italy
7. San Fior, Italy
8. St. Loup, Champagne, France: March 1918
9. Boncourt, France
10. Guesnain, France
11. Bapaume, France
12. Rocourt-Saint-Martin, France
13. Erre, France
14. Bühl, France

== Notable personnel ==
- Bernhard Ultsch
- Wilhelm Hippert
- Ludwig Gaim
- Reinhold Jörke

== Operations ==
Jasta 39 opened combat operations in support of Armee-Abteilung B on 15 August 1917. On 15 September 1917, it was transferred to Italy, where it would score 41 aerial victories. The squadron would return to France in March 1918, and serve there until war's end.

== Aircraft ==
Jasta 39 operated Albatros D.III and Albatros D.V fighters while in Italy. It is not known what other aircraft were used.
