= Military Order of Max Joseph =

Military Order of Max Joseph Militär-Max-Joseph-Orden
- Badge and breast star of the order
- Type: Military order in three classes
- Awarded for: Bravery and meritorious leadership in battle
- Description: White-enameled Maltese cross with a blue-enameled center medallion. There are rays between the arms of the Grand Cross and Commander's Cross, but not the Knight's Cross.
- Country: (Kingdom of Bavaria) Bavaria
- Presented by: the Kingdom of Bavaria
- Eligibility: Military officers
- Status: Obsolete
- Established: 1 January 1806

Precedence
- Next (higher): House Equestrian Order of Saint George
- Next (lower): Order of Merit of the Bavarian Crown

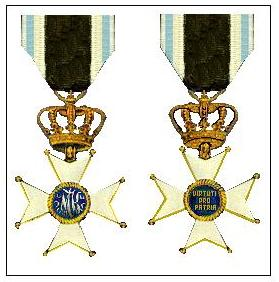
Military Max Joseph Order

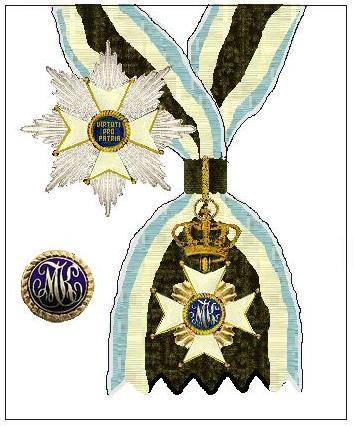
The Grand Cross

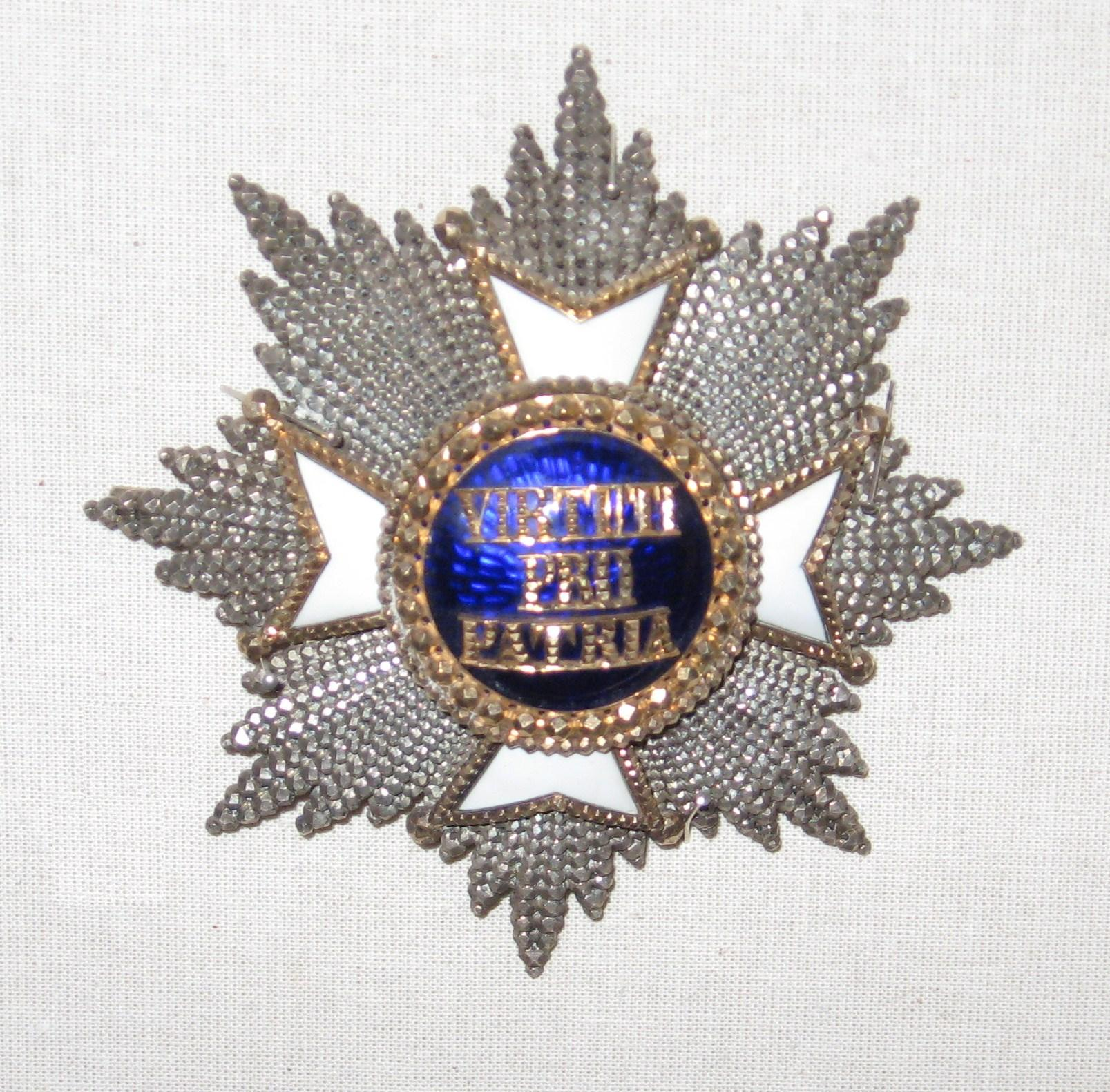
Star

The Military Order of Max Joseph (German: Militär-Max-Joseph-Orden) was the highest military order of the Kingdom of Bavaria. It was founded on 1 January 1806 by Maximilian I Joseph of Bavaria, the first king of Bavaria. The order came in three classes:

- Grand Cross (Großkreuz)
- Commander's Cross (Kommandeurkreuz)
- Knight's Cross (Ritterkreuz).

Individuals who received the order and were not already members of the nobility were ennobled and would add the title of "Ritter von" to their family name. A Bavarian title of nobility obtained through the Military Order of Max Joseph was valid for the recipient's life only.

The order became obsolete in 1918 with the collapse of the Bavarian monarchy on Germany's defeat in World War I. However, the order's chancery continued to process outstanding award recommendations to at least 1922.

== Description ==
The badge of the order was a white-enameled gold Maltese cross with balls at each cross point. The center medallion, in blue enamel and edged in gold, featured the monogram of Max Joseph on the obverse (a cursive "MJK") and the Latin motto of the order, "Virtuti pro patria" ("Bravery for the fatherland") on the reverse, both in gold. Above the cross was a gold crown.

The badge of the Knight's Cross was much smaller than that of many other military orders and decorations. It measured 28 mm in width (and 50 mm in height including the crown and ring), compared to Bavaria's Military Merit Order, the badge of whose lower grades measured 41 mm by 45 mm. It was worn from a ribbon on the officer's medal bar ahead of other decorations or, typically, separately worn through the buttonhole. In 1951, wear of the Knight's Cross around the neck, an unofficial practice for some time, was permitted by the still-existing chancery of the order. The badge of a Commander's Cross was somewhat larger than the Knight's Cross, measuring 38 mm by 55 mm. It was worn from a ribbon around the neck. The Grand Cross was still larger (68 mm by 100 mm), and had golden rays between the arms of the cross.

The star of the order, which only came with the Grand Cross, was a silver eight-pointed star (with each point made of 7 (vertical/horizontal) or 9 (diagonal) rays). The center of the star featured a badge of the order, but with an oversized medallion, bearing the motto "Virtuti pro patria".

The ribbon of the order was black moiré with inner white and outer blue edge stripes.

== Nobility ==
For recipients of the order who were not already members of the nobility, receipt of the order conferred a patent of nobility. This patent was not inheritable, similar to a knighthood in the United Kingdom. When a recipient was ennobled, his surname name was changed by the addition of the title "Ritter von" ("Knight of"). Thus for example the later Field Marshal Wilhelm Ritter von Leeb was born Wilhelm Leeb.

Such a patent of nobility only applied to Bavarian subjects; non-Bavarians could receive the Military Order of Max Joseph but not use a title because of this. Thus for example General Erich Ludendorff remained plain Ludendorff, although he was decorated with the Grand Cross of the order in 1916.

Note that not all Bavarian "Ritter von" were knights of the Military Order of Max Joseph. The Order of Merit of the Bavarian Crown, a high civil honor (but also frequently awarded to military personnel) also conferred a patent of nobility. For example, the 1920s-era Minister President of Bavaria Gustav Ritter von Kahr was a recipient of the Merit Order of the Bavarian Crown rather than the Military Order of Max Joseph. Furthermore, "Ritter von" was also a hereditary title in some noble families and had no connection to these orders.

== Notable recipients ==
- Prince Leopold of Bavaria
- Rupprecht, Crown Prince of Bavaria
- Hans Ritter von Adam
- Karl Ritter von Bolle
- General Sir Colin Campbell
- Adolf Ritter von Denk
- Nikolaus zu Dohna-Schlodien
- Franz Ritter von Epp
- Erich von Falkenhayn
- Robert Ritter von Greim
- Wilhelm Groener
- Karl Ritter von Halt
- Bruno Ritter von Hauenschild
- Paul von Hindenburg
- Franz Ritter von Hipper
- Prince Heinrich of Bavaria
- Franz Ritter von Hörauf
- Max Hoffmann
- Fritz Ritter von Kraußer
- Friedrich Freiherr Kress von Kressenstein
- Hermann von Kuhl
- Wilhelm Ritter von Leeb
- Erich Ludendorff
- August von Mackensen
- Mehmed V
- Reinhard Scheer
- Eugen Ritter von Schobert
- Hans von Seeckt
- Hans Ritter von Seißer
- Wilhelm Ritter von Thoma
- Ludwig Ritter von Tutschek
- Adolf Ritter von Tutschek
- Otto Weddigen
