= Ludwig Gaim =

- Born: 1 April 1892; Deggendorf, Kingdom of Bavaria, German Empire
- Died: 10 January 1979 (aged 86)
- Military career
- Allegiance: Germany
- Branch: Artillery, then flying service
- Service years: 1914 - ca 1943
- Rank: Vizefeldwebel
- Unit: FA(A) 293, Jagdstaffel 39
- Awards: Iron Cross Second and First Class, Austro-Hungarian Silver Medal for Bravery, Military Verdeinst Cross Third Class with Swords
- Other work: World War II service with the Nazis

Standartenführer Ludwig Gaim (born 1 April 1892, date of death unknown) was a World War I flying ace credited with five aerial victories. He ended the war as a Vizefeldwebel.

Gaim would return to his nation's service in World War II after joining the Nazi Party. He rose to a colonelcy in the Schutzstaffel as a pilot with Hitler's personal bodyguard.

== Early life and service ==
Ludwig Gaim was born in Deggendorf, the Kingdom of Bavaria, on 1 April 1892. He joined an artillery unit in the Imperial German Army during August 1914. He served on the Verdun Front and was awarded the Iron Cross Second Class on 21 October 1914. He continued artillery duty until July 1916. He then transferred to the Luftstreitkräfte for aviation duty with Flieger-Abteilung (Artillerie) 293 (Flier Detachment (Artillery) 293). He flew artillery direction missions and other reconnaissance with this unit until wounded on 6 January 1917. He was promoted to Vizefeldwebel on 25 May 1917. After recovery from his wound, he trained as a single-seater fighter pilot. Upon graduation, he was shipped to Italy to join Jagdstaffel 39 (Fighter Squadron 39) on 27 June 1917. Between 25 October and 30 December 1917, he shot down five Italian aircraft. He was again wounded in action, while scoring his fifth victory.

Gaim accompanied Jasta 39 upon its return to service on the Reims sector of the Western Front in March 1918. He would not score again before he left the squadron on 4 April 1918.

== World War II service ==
Gaim also served in World War II in the Schutzstaffel with the Reichssicherheitsdienst. Gaim was a pilot in Hitler's personnel air unit led by Hans Baur. He joined the Nazi Party as member number 763,780 and the Schutzstaffel as member number 279,441. He ultimately achieved the rank of SS-Standartenführer (Colonel), on 9 November 1943, and Oberleutnant der Reserve.

== Honors and awards ==
- Iron Cross Second Class: 21 October 1914
- Military Verdeinst Cross 3rd Class with Swords: 7 April 1917
- Iron Cross First Class: 8 November 1917
- Austro-Hungarian Silver Medal
