= Malincourt =

- Commune
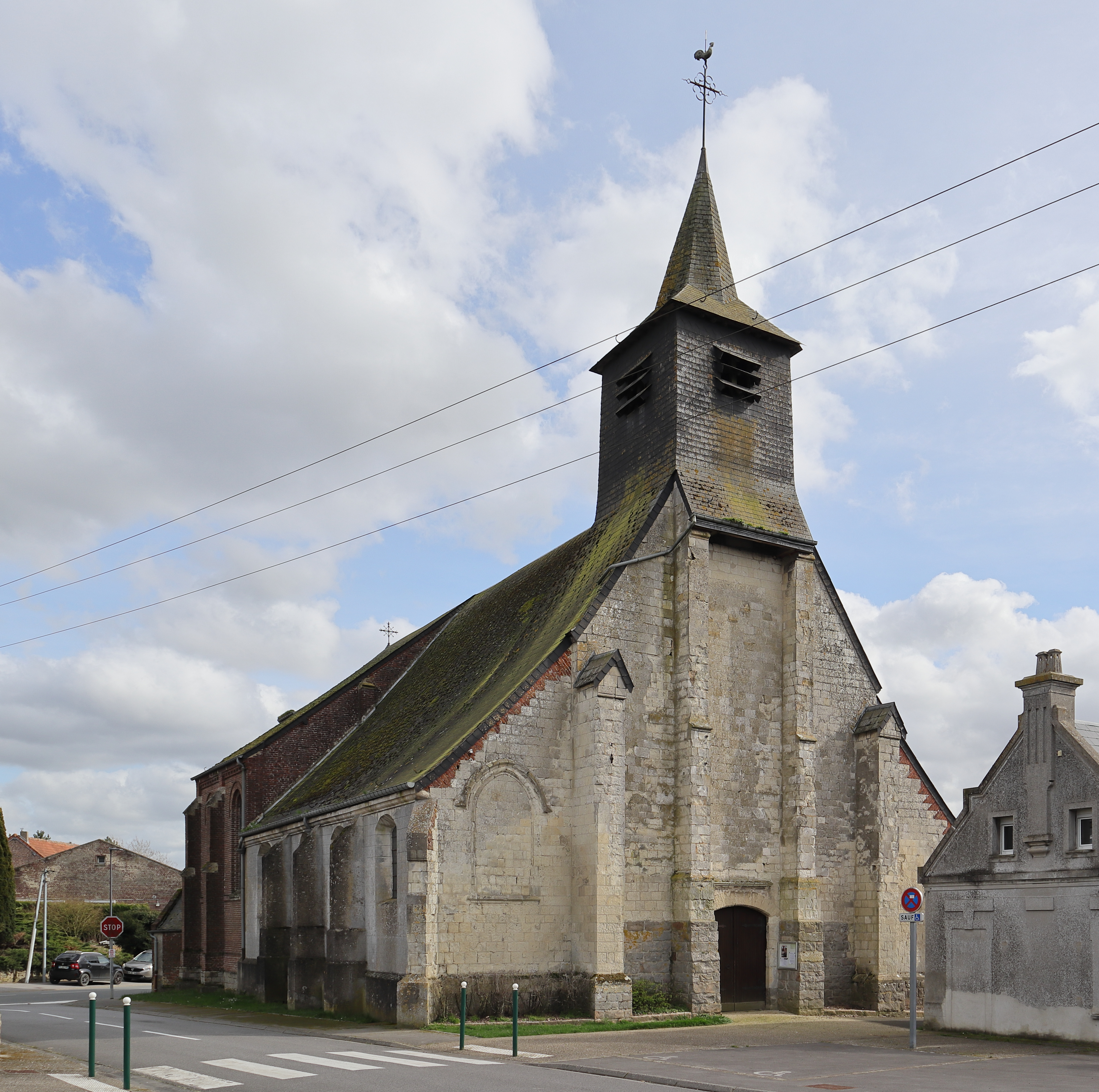
- The church in Malincourt

- Coat of arms
- Location of Malincourt
- Location within France Location within Hauts-de-France
- Coordinates: 50°02′53″N 3°19′32″E
- Country: France
- Region: Hauts-de-France
- Department: Nord
- Arrondissement: Cambrai
- Canton: Le Cateau-Cambrésis
- Intercommunality: CA Caudrésis–Catésis

Government
  - Mayor (2024–2026): Marie-Françoise Herbet
- Area^{1}: 10.3 km^{2} (4.0 sq mi)
- Elevation: 140 m (460 ft)
- Highest elevation: 152 m (499 ft)
- Lowest elevation: 110 m (360 ft)
- Population (2023): 498
  - Density: 48.3/km^{2} (125/sq mi)
- Time zone: UTC+01:00 (CET)
  - Summer (DST): UTC+02:00 (CEST)
- INSEE/Postal code: 59372 /59127
- ^{1} French Land Register data, which excludes lakes, ponds, glaciers > 1 km^{2} (0.386 sq mi or 247 acres) and river estuaries.

Malincourt (French pronunciation: [malɛ̃kuʁ]) is a commune in the Nord department in northern France.

== Heraldry ==
Arms of Malincourt	The arms of Malincourt are blazoned : Argent, a lion gules, and in chief a label of 5 points azure. (possibly heraldically identical to Audencourt as the only difference the number of points on the label)

== See also ==
- Communes of the Nord department
