= Oskar Hennrich =

German flying ace during World War I

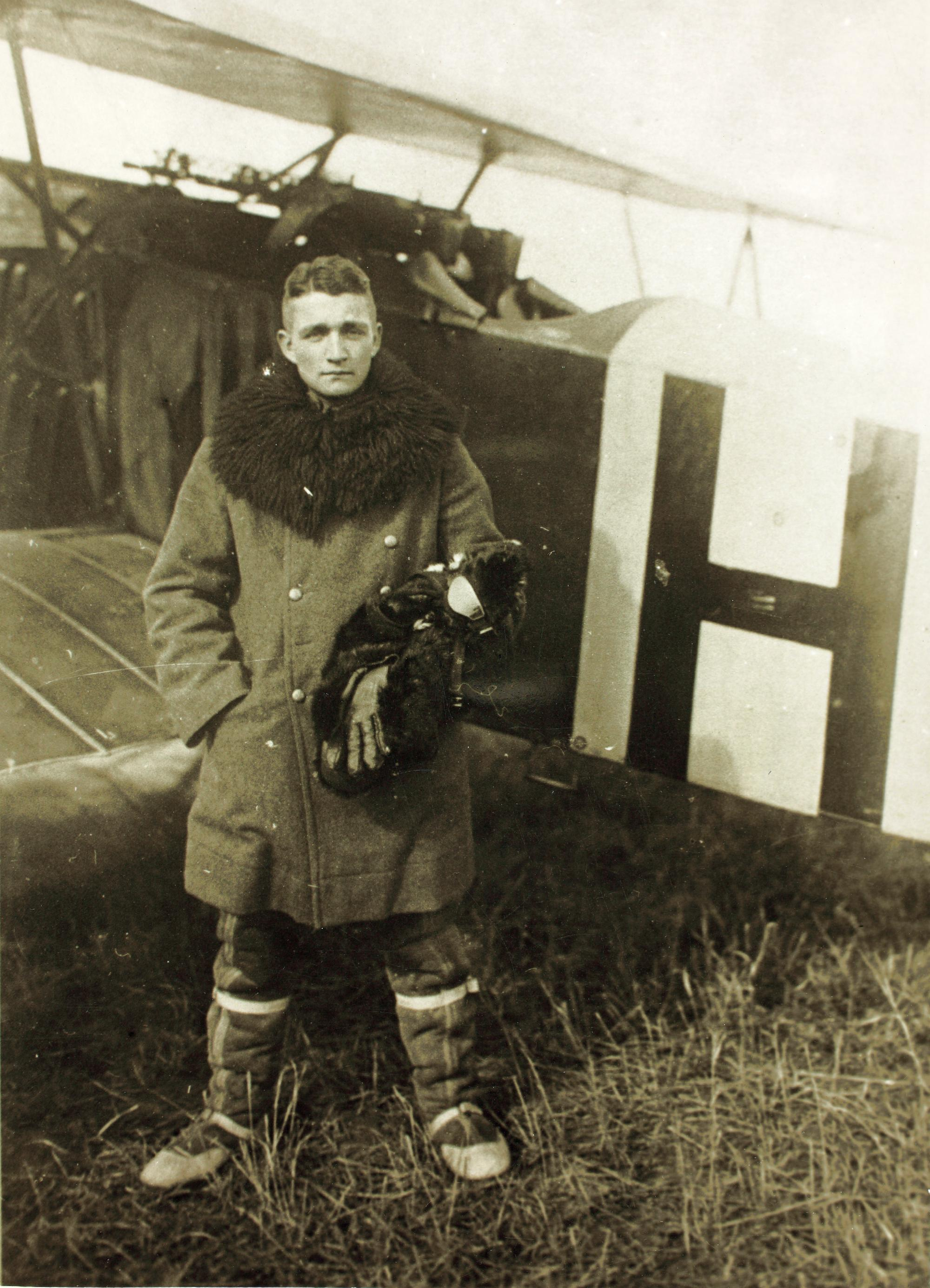
- Born: Unknown
- Died: Unknown
- Military career
- Allegiance: Germany
- Branch: Aviation
- Rank: Vizefeldwebel
- Units: Kampfgeschwader (Tactical Bomber Wing) II; Flieger-Abteilung (Artillerie) (Flier Detachment (Artillery)) 273; Jagdstaffel 46 (Fighter Squadron 46)
- Awards: Military Merit Cross; Iron Cross First and Second Class

Oskar Hennrich was a German World War I flying ace credited with 20 aerial victories. He was a notable balloon buster, since thirteen of his wins were destructions of the observation balloons. He was the leading ace of his squadron, and ended his service with the rank of Vizefeldwebel.

== Aerial service ==
Hennrich's first assignment was as an aerial gunner with Kampfgeschwader (Tactical Bomber Wing) II, from 20 April 1916 to 20 February 1917. He then trained as a pilot, and was assigned to Flieger-Abteilung (Artillerie) (Flier Detachment (Artillery)) 273 on 10 October 1917. He moved on to Jagdstaffel 46 (Fighter Squadron 46) on 6 May 1918. On 14 May 1918 he scored his first victory flying a Fokker D.VII with his initial 'H' on the fuselage; he shot down an observation balloon west of Albert. He continued to score, mostly balloons, until 1 October 1918. On 24 September, he shot down three balloons. He was awarded the Military Merit Cross on 3 November 1918.
