= List of aerial victories of Erwin Böhme =

Oberleutnant Erwin Böhme (1879–1917) served under Hauptmann Oswald Boelcke at the same time as Manfred von Richthofen. Böhme scored all of his 24 aerial victories while flying with Jagdstaffel 2 except the first and thirteenth, won while with Kampfstaffel 10 and Jagdstaffel 29 respectively.

== The victory list ==
Confirmed victories in the list are numbered and listed chronologically. An unconfirmed victory is denoted by "u/c". Doubled horizontal lines indicate a change in squadrons by Böhme.

This is a complete listing of all known victories. When casualties for air crews are reported, they are listed pilot first, aerial observers next. Abbreviations in sources were expanded by creating editor.

No.	Date/time	Foe	Result	Location	Casualties
1	Morning of 2 August 1916	Nieuport 12 from 10th Fighter Detachment, Imperial Russian Air Service		Rogistche	Eduard Pulpe, killed in action
2	17 September 1916 @ 07:45 hours	Sopwith 1½ Strutter serial number A1913 from No. 70 Squadron RFC	Crashed	Northwest of Hervilly, France	2nd Lt. KIA; 2nd Lt. Ronald Wood wounded in action/prisoner of war
u/c	23 September 1916 @ 09:55 hours	Martinsyde G.100 s/n 7475 from No. 27 Squadron RFC	Crashlanded	Hervilly, France	Lt. Eric James Roberts KIA
3	10 October 1916 @ 09:50 hours	Airco DH.2 s/n 4856 from No. 18 Squadron RFC	Wrecked and written off	Longueval, France	Lt. Charles Gerschell Shaumer unhurt; Lt. Hardinge unhurt
4	20 October 1916 @ 10:30 hours	Royal Aircraft Factory FE.2b s/n 4867 from No. 11 Squadron RFC		Monchy	2nd Lt. Norman Rausch de Pomeroy KIA; 2nd Lt. William Black WIA/POW
5	22 October 1916 @ 11:50 hours	Sopwith 1½ Strutter s/n 7786 from No. 45 Squadron RFC		Les Boeufs	2nd Lt. Oliver John Wade KIA; 2nd Lt. William Johnson Thuell KIA
6	9 November 1916 @ 15:10 hours	Royal Aircraft Factory FE.8 s/n 6409 from No. 40 Squadron RFC	Forced landing	Arleux, France	2nd Lt. Herbert Farmer Evans WIA/POW
7	22 November 1916 @ 14:10 hours	Morane-Saulnier L s/n A248 of No. 43 Squadron RFC	Dived into British territory	Longevual	Lt. Elmer Peter Roberts WIA; Captain Graham Lauder Watson WIA
8	26 December 1916 @ 15:15 hours	Royal Aircraft Factory BE.2c from No. 5 Squadron RFC	Dived into British territory	Courcelette, France	2nd Lt. William Henry Hubbard WIA
9	7 January 1917 @ 12:30 hours	Airco DH.2 s/n 7851 from No. 32 Squadron RFC	Shot down	Beugny, France	2nd Lt. Ethelbert Godwin Stockwell Wagner KIA
10	4 February 1917 @ 15:05 hours	Airco DH.2 s/n A2536 from No. 32 Squadron RFC		Sally-le-Transloy	2nd Lt. William Curphey WIA
11	4 February 1917 @ 15:30 hours	Royal Aircraft Factory BE.2e s/n 7105 from No. 15 Squadron RFC	Crashed	Hébuterne, France	Sergeant Frederick James Shaw KIA; 2nd Lt. George William Bathurst Bradford
12	10 February 1917 @ 12:20 hours	Airco DH.2 from No. 32 Squadron RFC	Downed inside British lines	West of Gommecourt, France	2nd Lt. Arthur Vincent Howard Gompertz survived
13	14 July 1917 @ 07:20 hours	Nieuport 17 s/n A6783 from No. 40 Squadron RFC		Capelle, Belgium	2nd Lt. Godfrey Davis POW
14	19 September 1917 @ 10:47 hours	Royal Aircraft Factory RE.8 s/n B5012 from No. 9 Squadron RFC	Crashed in British territory	Boesinghem	2nd Lt. Henry Little Devlin KIA; 2nd Lt. Frederick Adam Wright KIA
15	21 September 1917 @ 08:52 hours	Royal Aircraft Factory RE.8 s/n A3617 from No. 53 Squadron RFC		Koman	Captain Robert Nicholas Fenwick Mills KIA; Lt. William Angus Browne KIA
16	5 October 1917 @ 08:15 hours	Bristol F.2B s/n kB1133 from No. 20 Squadron RFC	Crashlanded	Dadizeele	Captain Donald Dacre Walrond-Skinner WIA/POW; Private Francis J. Johns WIA/POW
17	10 October 1917 @ 07:25 hours	Nieuport 27 s/n B6791 from No. 29 Squadron RFC	Forced to land; wrecked	Zillebeke	2nd Lt. Gerald Benson Wigle WIA
18	13 October 1917 @ 08:50 hours	Sopwith Pup s/n B1800 from No. 54 Squadron RFC		Southwest of Koekelare, Belgium	2nd Lt. Frederick William Gibbes KIA
19	14 October 1917 @ 07:42 hours	Nieuport 27 s/n B6778 from No. 29 Squadron RFC	Crashed and wrecked; observed by German ground troops to be just within the British lines	Ypres, Belgium	2nd Lt. Henry Douglas MacPherson KIA
20	16 October 1917 @ 09:25 hours	Nieuport 17 s/n B3578 from No. 29 Squadron RFC	Surrendered; landed on Böhme's home airfield	Magermeirie	2nd Lt. Frederick John Ortweiler POW
21	31 October 1917 @ 17:15 hours	Royal Aircraft Factory SE.5a s/n B544 from No. 84 Squadron RFC		Zillebeke Lake	2nd Lt. George Robert Gray died of wounds
22	6 November 1917 @ 11:50 hours	Sopwith Camel s/n B2408 from No. 65 Squadron RFC	Crashed heavily	Molen	2nd Lt. William L. Harrison WIA/POW
23	20 November 1917 @ 10:30 hours	Nieuport 17 from 5me Escadrille de Chasse, Belgian Air Component		Osterke, Belgium	First sergeant Leon Andre Robert Ciselet
24	29 November 1917 @ 12:55 hours	Sopwith Camel		Zonnebeke	

Sources: Background material from Franks et al. 1993, p. 78. Details were garnered from Franks and Giblin 2003, pp. 9–45.
