= Arthur Laumann =

German WWI flying ace (1894–1970)

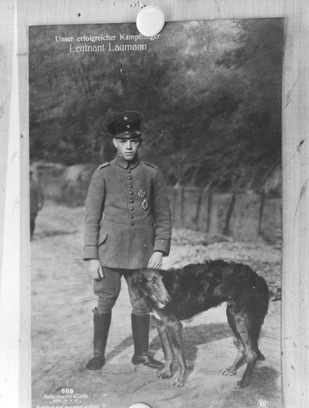
- Laumann in a postcard (photo likely taken around 1917)
- Born: 4 July 1894; Essen, German Empire
- Died: 18 November 1970 (aged 76); Munster, West Germany
- Military career
- Allegiance: Germany
- Branch: Artillery, aerial service
- Rank: Leutnant
- Units: 83rd Field Artillery Regiment, FA(A) 265
- Commands: Jasta 66, Jasta 10, II Group of JG 132
- Awards: Pour le Merite, Royal House Order of Hohenzollern, Iron Cross
- Other work: Generalmajor of Luftwaffe in World War II

Arthur Laumann was a German World War I flying ace who scored 28 victories in just over three months. He rose to become Air Attaché to Greece and Yugoslavia during World War II, raising to a final rank of Luftwaffe Generalmajor.

== World War I ==
Born on 4 July 1894, in Essen, Germany, Laumann joined Field Artillery Regiment Number 83 on 2 August 1914, and was assigned to 40th Artillery Ranging Troop. He was promoted to Gefreiter (Private first class) on 15 February 1915, and to Unteroffizier (Noncommissioned officer) on 1 August 1915. He won an Iron Cross Second Class on 8 February 1916. On 13 January 1917, he became an Offizier-Stellvertreter (Officer candidate). He was commissioned Leutnant der Reserve on 19 May 1917. On 14 August 1917, he transferred to the Luftstreitkräfte for pilot training.

He took pilot training with the 13th Flying Replacement Battalion until 26 February 1918. By 6 March 1918, he was assigned to FA(A) 265, which was an artillery spotting squadron flying two seated airplanes. After only two months, on 19 May, he was assigned to fly Fokker D.VII fighter planes while commanding Jagdstaffel 66. Eight days after joining Jagdstaffel 66, on 27 May 1918, he scored his first triumph in the same dogfight in which his commanding officer, Rudolf Windisch, was shot down and disappeared.

Laumann scored three victories in June, and became an ace on 1 July. He ran up 12 wins in July, including a triple on the 18th. He also was awarded the Iron Cross First Class on the 17th. He ended the month as a triple ace.

He shot down another dozen enemy planes in August, including another triple on the 9th. Also during July and August, he briefly commanded Jasta 66. In mid-August, he was transferred to command Jagdstaffel 10 in Jagdgeschwader 1 (JG 1), the Jagdgeschwader von Richthofen. The JG 1 commander was Hermann Göring.

Laumann scored his last four victories with Jasta 10, including his final one on 4 September. On 7 September, he was awarded the Royal House Order of Hohenzollern. The Pour le Merite, or Blue Max, followed on 25 October, and was the final one awarded to any member of JG I. He's one of the few pilots who scored all of his victories entirely on the Fokker D.VII, along with Georg von Hantelmann, Werner Preuss and Olivier Freiherr von Beaulieu-Marconnay.

== Service after World War I ==
After the armistice, he was transferred to the Signals Battalion of Military District Command VI until August 1919. From there he was returned to the 83rd Field Artillery Regiment and placed on indefinite leave. He was mustered out on 31 December 1920.

In 1932 and 1933, he became an advisor to an aviation group. He was appointed SA-Standartenführer, a paramilitary field officer's rank, on 24 August 1932. From there, he moved to leading a formation of the German Air Sport Formation until 31 March 1935. This led to his entry into the Luftwaffe as a Major on 1 April 1935 as commander of Air Region Reserve 12 in Cologne. Also during 1935, he was appointed to squadron command in II. Gruppe of Jagdgeschwader 132. He held that post until 1 April 1937, when he moved up to command of II. Gruppe of JG 132.

On 4 September 1939, he left his command to become the Air Attaché for Yugoslavia and Greece, with his home base being the German Embassy in Belgrade, Yugoslavia. Laumann held this post until 29 May 1941. After that, he held a series of administrative posts until his retirement on 1 March 1945. He had been promoted to Oberst (Colonel) on 1 January 1940; he was given a final promotion to Generalmajor (Major General) as he retired.

== Awards and decorations ==
- Prussian Pour le Mérite: 25 October 1918, Leutnant der Reserve, Leader of Jagdstaffel 10
- Prussian Royal Hohenzollern House Order, Knight's Cross with Swords: 7 September 1918
- Prussian Iron Cross (1914)
  - 2nd Class : 8 February 1916
  - 1st Class: 17 July 1918
- War Merit Cross, 2nd Class with Swords
- Honour Cross of the World War 1914/1918
- German Army Pilot's Badge – World War I award: 18 May 1918
- Luftwaffe Pilot's Badge: 15 December 1936
- Italian Order of the Roman Eagle, Commander with Swords
- Croatian Order of the Iron Trefoil, 1st Class
- Croatian Order of the Crown of King Zvonimir, 1st Class with Swords
- Royal Yugoslavian Order of the White Eagle, 3rd Class
- Croatian Pilot's Badge
- “Jagdgeschwader Frhr. V. Richthofen Nr.1 1917/18” War Commemorative Cuff-Title
