= Jagdstaffel 32 =

Group within the Imperial German Army

Jasta 32
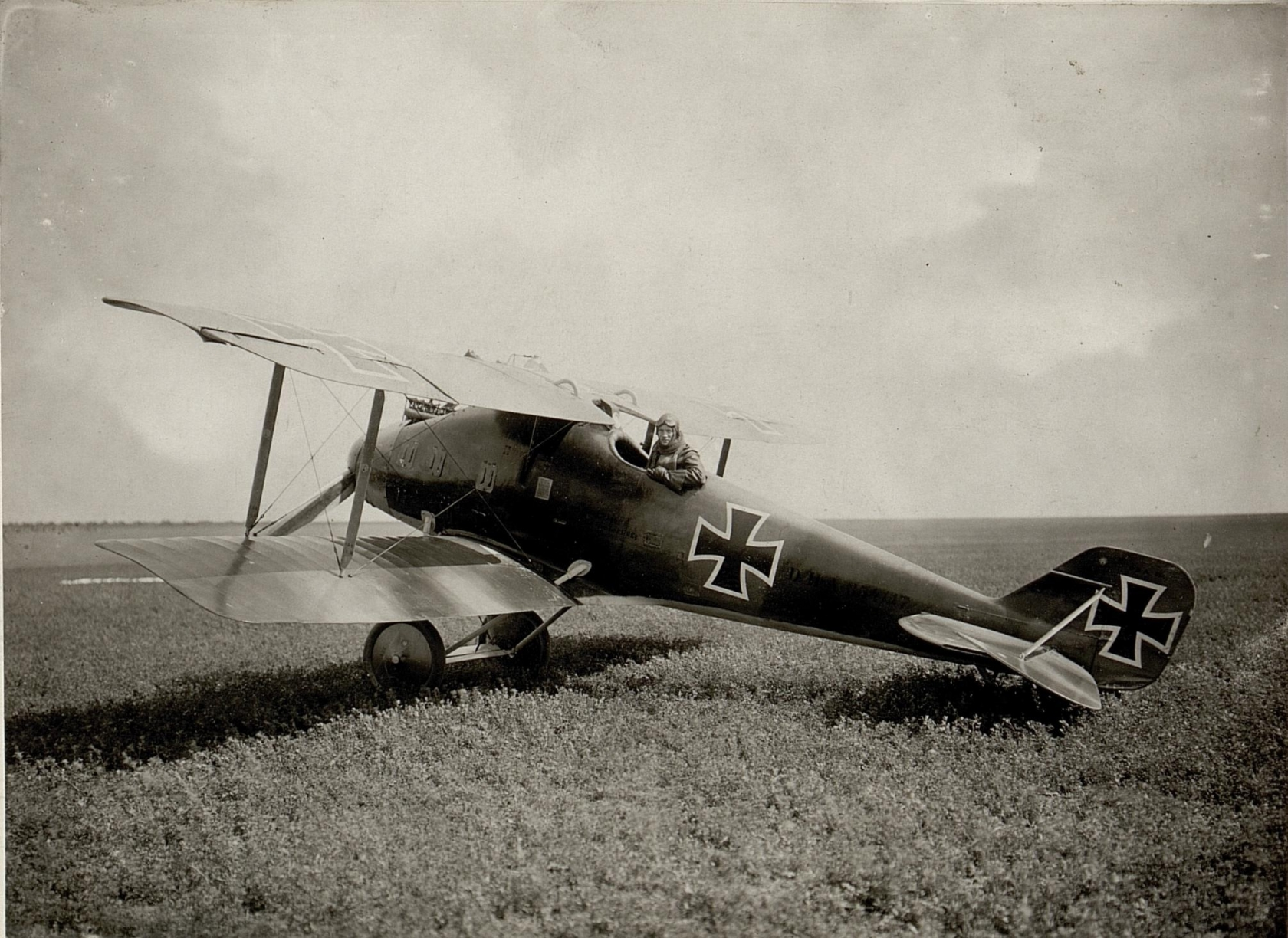
- The Roland D.II was Jasta 32's original model of aircraft.
- Active: 1916–1918
- Country: German Empire
- Branch: Luftstreitkräfte
- Type: Fighter squadron
- Engagements: World War I

Royal Bavarian Jagdstaffel 32, commonly abbreviated to Jasta 32, was a "hunting group" (i.e., fighter squadron) of the German Luftstreitkräfte, the air arm of the Imperial German Army during World War I. The unit would score 41 aerial victories during the war, including four enemy observation balloons. In turn, they would suffer the expense of eight killed in action, five killed in flying accidents, four wounded in action, two injured in accidents, and one taken prisoner of war.

== History ==
Royal Bavarian Jagdstaffel 32 was formed on 14 December 1916 at FEA 9 in Darmstadt. It was operational by 22 February 1917. It would not score its first aerial victory until 4 July 1917. By September, it had been assigned to Jagdgruppe von Braun.

Jasta 32 moved to the 17 Armee front in March 1918 as part of Jagdgruppe 8. A change to Jagdgruppe 4 followed in September 1918. It ended its war in support of 2 Armee. The squadron disbanded ten days after war's end, on 21 November 1918, at FEA 2, Fürth.

== Commanding officers (Staffelführer) ==
1. Heinrich Schwandner: transferred in from Schutzstaffel 27 on 23 February 1917 – 16 March 1917 (KIA)
2. Bartholomäus Schröder: 17 March 1917 – 30 June 1917
3. Otto Schmidt: transferred in from Jasta 7 on 30 June 1917 – transferred out to Jasta 29 on 19 August 1917
4. Hans Auer: 19 August 1917 – 19 October 1917
5. Eduard Ritter von Schleich: 23 October 1917 – 10 January 1918
6. Johann Czermak: 10 January 1918 – 23 July 1918
7. Emil Koch (WIA): 23 July 1918 – 24 October 1918 (WIA)
8. Hans Böhning: 1 November 1918 – 11 November 1918

== Aerodromes ==
1. Darmstadt, Germany: 14 December 1916 – 21 February 1917
2. Brulange: 22 February 1917 – 9 March 1917
3. Chéry-lès-Pouilly: 9 March 1917 – June 1917
4. Avanson: June 1917 – 30 June 1917
5. Landreville: 30 June 1917 – 21 September 1917
6. Boulin Ferme: 21 September 1917 – 20 October 1917
7. Chéry-les-Pouilly: 21 October 1917 – 1 February 1918
8. Guesnain: 1 February 1918 – 28 March 1918
9. Favreuil, Bapaume: 28 March 1918 – 18 April 1918
10. Epinoy: 18 April 1918 – 8 August 1918
11. Villers-au-Tertre: 8 August 1918 – 28 August 1918
12. Villers-St.-Armand: 28 August 1918 – 29 September 1918
13. Bühl: 29 September 1918 – 12 October 1918
14. Harmignies: 12 October 1918 – 28 October 1918
15. Gosselies: 28 October 1918 – 11 November 1918
16. Trier: 11 November 1918
17. Fürth: Disbanded on 21 November 1918.

== Notable members ==
Rudolf Windisch was the most notable of the aces who served in Jasta 32. He won his second through eighth victories with the squadron, before he left to command Jasta 66 and win the Pour le Mérite ("The Blue Max"). He was unique in that he was the only pilot of the war to win the Prussian Order of the Crown, Fourth Class with Swords.

Eduard Ritter von Schleich was another Blue Max winner; he either commanded Jasta 32 or the Jagdgruppes (fighter wings) to which it belonged, for almost a year of the squadron's short existence, although he won no victories flying with the unit. Hans Böhning was another honoured ace who commanded the unit without scoring, although his window of opportunity was only ten days.

Other flying aces who served with the squadron included Hans Auer, Otto Schmidt, Fritz Kieckhäfer, Hans Rolfes, Helmut Brünig, Arno Benzler, and Emil Koch.

== Aircraft ==
Originally equipped with Roland D.IIs, but Albatros fighters were also used by the unit. They were later re-equipped with Fokker Dr.I triplanes, and finally with Fokker D.VIIs, the premier fighter planes of the war. Markings generally included engine cowlings painted Bavarian blue on the Jasta's aircraft. Schleich's aircraft were exceptional; they were all-black.

== Operations ==
After mobilization on 22 February 1917, the new squadron began operations in support of Armee-Abteilung A Sector. On 1 June 1917, the Jasta shifted to Avancon and support of 7 Armee. By September, it had been assigned to Jagdgruppe von Braun, along with Jasta 13, Jasta 14, Jasta 16, Jasta 21, Jasta 22, Jasta 23, and Jasta 34. It switched to support 17 Armee as part of Jagdgruppe 8, commanded by von Schleich; Jasta 23, Jasta 35, and Jasta 39 also belonged to JG 8. By the end of September, Jasta 32 was based at Buhl as part of Jagdgruppe 4, which was then commanded by von Schleich, and also contained Jastas 23, 34, and 35. Jasta 32 spent the last two months of the war, October and November 1918, in support of 2 Armee. It moved to Trier on the final day of the war.
