= Auffarth =

Auffarth is a German-language surname. Notable people with the surname include:

- Blythe Auffarth (born 1985), American actress
- Harald Auffarth (died 1946), World War I German fighter ace
- Sandra Auffarth (born 1986), German equestrian
