= Erwin Böhme =

German flying ace (1879–1917)

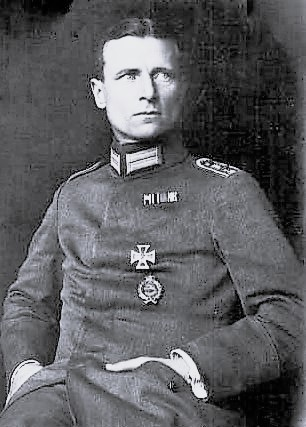
- Erwin Böhme, after the death of Oswald Boelcke
- Born: 29 July 1879; Holzminden, German Empire
- Died: 29 November 1917 (aged 38) over Zonnebeke, Belgium
- Relatives: brothers Wilhelm, Erich, Gerhard, Rudolf (KIA), Martin (KIA)
- Military career
- Allegiance: German Empire
- Branch: Luftstreitkräfte (Air Force)
- Service years: 1899, 1914–1917
- Rank: Oberleutnant
- Units: Kampfstaffel 10 (Combat Squadron 10); Jagdstaffel 2 (Fighter Squadron 2); Jagdstaffel 29 (Fighter Squadron 29)
- Commands: Jagdstaffel 29 (Fighter Squadron 29); Jagdstaffel 2 (Fighter Squadron 2)
- Awards: Pour le Mérite; Knight's Cross with Swords of the Royal House Order of Hohenzollern; Iron Cross

Erwin Böhme (29 July 1879 – 29 November 1917) was a German World War I fighter ace credited with 24 aerial victories. He was born in Holzminden on 28 July 1879. Both studious and athletic, he became a champion swimmer, proficient ice skater, and expert skier, as well as an alpinist. After serving his mandated military service in 1899, and earning a civil engineering degree, he moved to Switzerland for three years of mountaineering.

He became interested in Africa. Walking solo, he crossed the Alps southward to Italy; there he took ship for German East Africa. From 1908 to 1914, Böhme completed a six-year employment contract on a timber plantation in Tanganyika where he oversaw construction of the Usambara Railway to export raw cedar timber to the Hubertus Mill in Germany. In July 1914, as his contract ended, Böhme sailed to Europe for an alpine holiday. He disembarked into World War I. Despite being 35 years old, he immediately returned to his old infantry unit, then trained as a pilot.

After serving in a bomber unit, he was transferred to Germany's first fighter squadron Jagdstaffel 2. During Böhme's combat career, he was a friend and eventual subordinate to Manfred von Richthofen, the Red Baron. He was also friend, subordinate, and wingman to Germany's leading ace of the time, Oswald Boelcke. Böhme was inadvertently responsible for Boelcke's death on 28 October 1916 when their planes collided. Although haunted by guilt, Böhme carried on, becoming a 24 victory ace (and a squadron leader). He also found heart for courtship via correspondence.

Erwin Böhme was killed in action on 29 November 1917, a month after his betrothal, while leading his squadron into combat. He died five days after receiving notice that he had won the German Empire's highest award for valor, the Pour le Merite. In 1930, his edited collected letters were published as Letters From a German Fighter Pilot to a Young Maiden.

== Early life ==
Erwin Böhme was born on 29 July 1879 in Holzminden, on the banks of the Weser River in the Duchy of Brunswick. He was one of six children – a daughter and five sons. His brothers were named Gerhard, Erich, Martin, and Rudolf, and the latter two would die in action during World War I.

Böhme was a multi-talented athlete from his youth. He was a proficient ice skater and an expert skier. Another sport he excelled in as he matured was mountaineering; he became the only foreign member of the Swiss Mountain Climber and Skier Guild. His prowess as a swimmer was demonstrated when he won a three-kilometer (1.9 Mile) race in Lake Zurich on 30 July 1905.

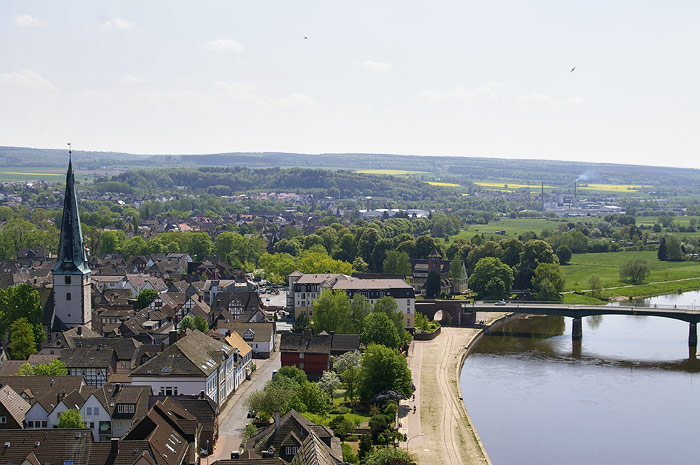
A 2006 view of Holzminden's old town.

Böhme was studious; he qualified as a civil engineer, graduating from a technical college in Dortmund. As required by German law, he performed his national service, serving in a Garde-Jäger Regiment (Guards Infantry Regiment) in 1899. Then the restless youth moved to Switzerland for a three year sojourn climbing in the Alps.

== African sojourn ==
While in Switzerland, Böhme read the letters of a Swiss explorer in Africa and corresponded with him. Undeterred by the explorer's death in March 1908, Böhme found a German emigration society to sponsor his move to German East Africa. Hiking solo, Böhme left Berne, climbed up and over the Jungfrau and the Matterhorn, and travelled on to Genoa. He took ship for Africa there. Once in East Africa, he entered into a six-year contract as an engineer for a German-owned timber plantation. He supervised the construction of the Usambara Railway from Neu-Hornow into the Pare Mountains of Tanganyika. The cedar timber extracted via the railroad was shipped to Germany for milling into pencil material by the Hubertus Mill.

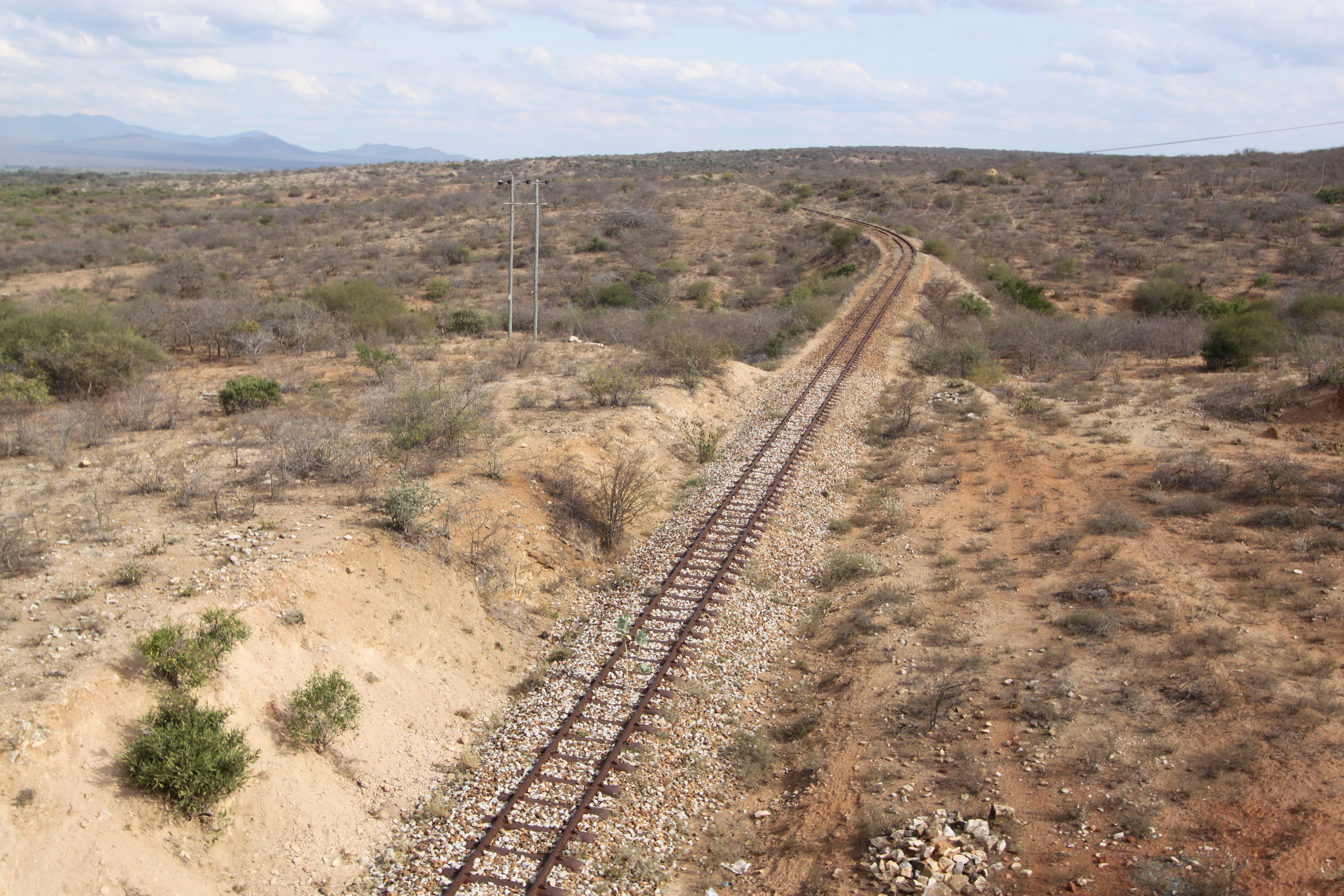
Usambara Railway tracks

In July 1914, Böhme returned to Germany, intent on an alpine holiday. However, upon landing in the midst of war breaking out, he reported to his old infantry regiment, despite turning 35 at month's end. Erwin Böhme promptly volunteered for aviation duty.

== Flying service ==
=== Duty as a bomber pilot ===
Though Böhme was the oldest student in training, he passed flight school at the top of his class in December 1914. His expertise got him a posting to instructor duty for nearly a year. During 1915, Böhme's brother Rudolf was killed in Russia.

In late November 1915, prompted by his request for a transfer, Erwin Böhme was posted to a tactical bomber unit, Kampfstaffel 10 (Battle Squadron 10), at Mörchingen. The unit was one of the squadrons comprising Kagohl 2 (Tactical Bombing Wing 2) commanded by Wilhelm Boelcke, elder brother of famous ace Oswald Boelcke. Teamed with a 47-year-old observer manning the gun in the rear seat of his Albatros C.I, Böhme submitted three combat claims for aerial victories; one claim for 2 August 1915 was reportedly confirmed, though it does not show as accredited on his official victory list.

In February 1916, Kampfstaffel 10 supported the opening of the Battle of Verdun. Shortly thereafter, Oswald Boelcke dropped in to visit his brother, flying a Fokker bearing combat damage. Later in March, Böhme continued his aerial combat career by engaging Farmans and a Nieuport from the French Service Aéronautique (Aeronautical Service). By May 1916, he had been commissioned as a leutnant, and was flying an Albatros fighter as well as his Roland LVG bomber.

=== Romantic interlude ===
On 20 May 1916, Böhme arranged leave time to visit the director of the Hubertus Mills. Director Heinrich Brüning and his wife were celebrating their 25th wedding anniversary when an airplane landed in a nearby meadow. Erwin and Martin Böhme had been dropped off to offer their congratulations and join the festivities. Among the other guests was Herr Brüning's eldest daughter, Annamarie. The attraction between herself and the ace was immediate. By the time the Böhme brothers departed via airplane the following day, Annamarie Brüning had agreed to regularly correspond with Erwin Böhme.

=== Posted to fighter service ===
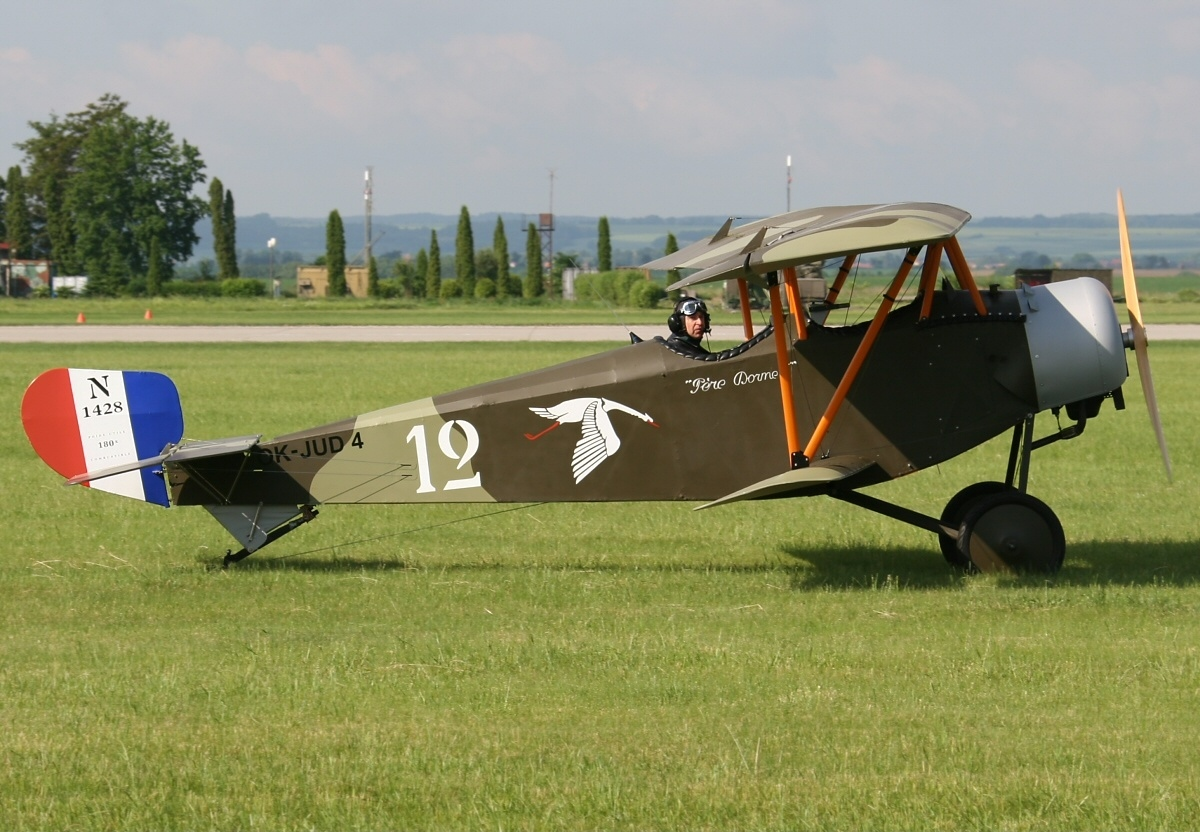
A Nieuport 12 replica in French livery.

Kampstaffel 10 shifted theaters in June 1916, transferring from France to Kovel, Russia. This posting would lead to his transfer to fighter aviation.

On 2 August 1916, Böhme scored his first accredited aerial victory, killing Franco-Latvian ace Eduard Pulpe after an extended fight. Eight days later, while Oswald Boelcke was on an official visit to his elder brother at Kampfstaffel 10, a telegram was received authorizing the establishment of the first German fighter squadrons, or Jagdstaffeln. Oswald Boelcke was given command of Jagdstaffel 2 (Fighter Squadron 2), with a free hand to choose his pilots for the new unit. After the brothers conferred, Oswald Boelcke followed Wilhelm's recommendations. The first pilot recruited from Wilhelm's unit for the new Jagdstaffel 2 was Erwin Böhme; the second was his squadronmate, Manfred von Richthofen. Boelcke's choices were momentous. He gave Richthofen the opportunity to eventually become the war's ace of aces. In the case of Böhme, the 25-year-old Boelcke acquired a mature and worldly best friend, as well as an aggressive fighter wingman. In turn, Böhme gave his opinion of Boelcke in one of his letters home:

"...as remarkable as it is that I am 37 and he is just 25 years old—I look up to him as a man and I am proud that a friendly relationship has grown between us."

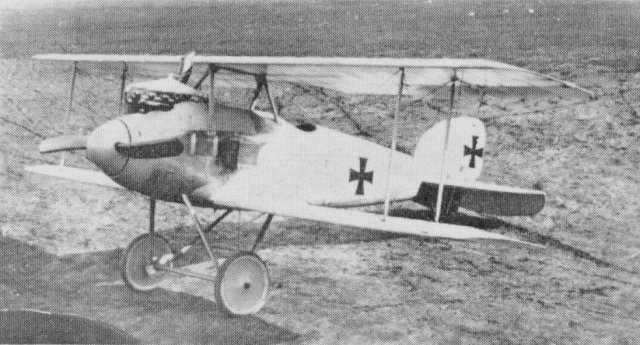
Böhme disliked the Albatros D.I, considering it too slow.

Böhme joined Jagdstaffel 2 at Bertincourt on 8 September 1916, after a month in transit. Nine days later, he used his newly issued Albatros D.I to score his first victory for the new squadron. Even as Boelcke scored his final run of 21 aerial victories during September and October 1916, Böhme, flying as his wingman, shot down four more British airplanes.

=== Tragedy ===
On the evening of 27 October 1916, a war-weary Boelcke fled the clamor of the squadron mess for the quiet of his own bedroom. Böhme joined him there. The two men talked deep into the night, until Boelcke's batman hinted at bedtime to end the conversation.

The following day, as Boelcke flew his sixth combat patrol, he was accompanied by Böhme, Richthofen, and three other pilots. The German sextet attacked a pair of British Airco DH2 fighters. With Böhme as his wingman, Boelcke chased one of the British pushers. The bobbing, weaving pursuit caused the wings of Böhme's and Boelcke's biplanes to momentarily hide the two from one another. The two planes touched while in the blind spot. The collision appeared minor, but was fatal. Böhme's landing gear skimmed Boelcke's top wing. As the speed of the aircraft tore the covering from the wing spars, Boelcke spiraled to his death while Böhme looked on helplessly.

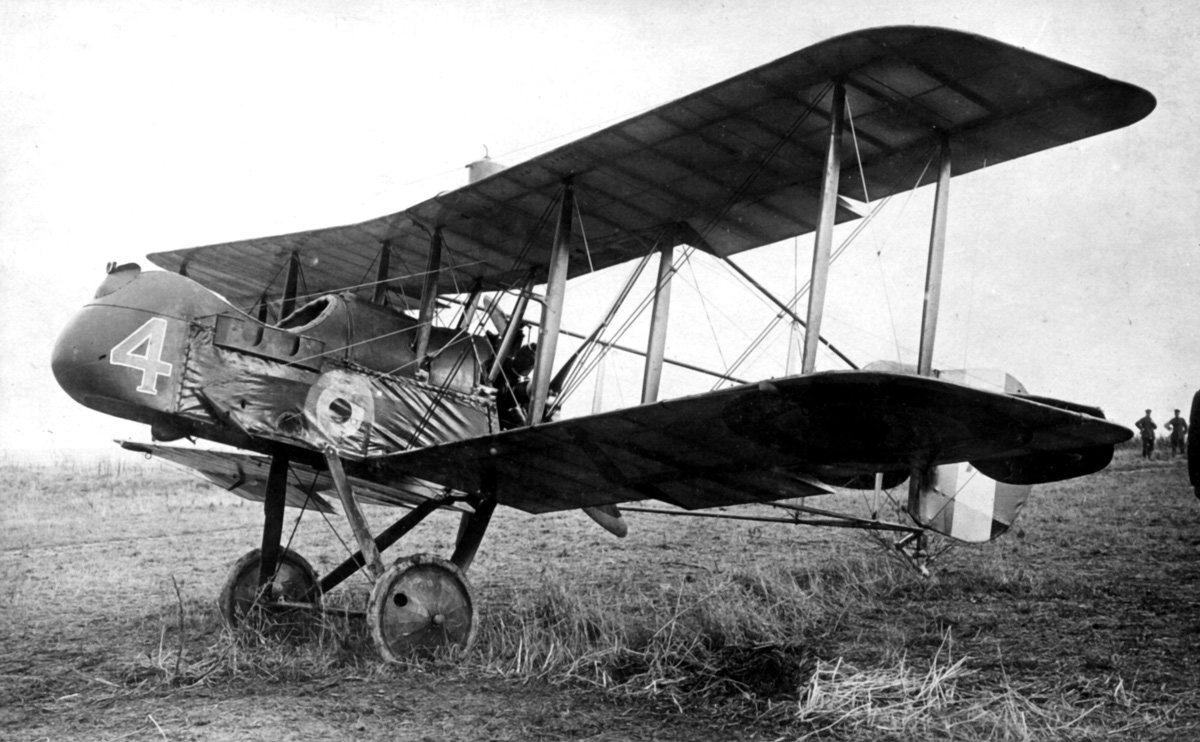
An Airco DH.2 pusher-engined fighter.

A distraught Erwin Böhme returned to base and wrecked his airplane while landing with a damaged undercarriage. Even though he could not recall his own accident, he wrote a lengthy and vivid account of Boelcke's death to Annamarie. Though no one blamed Böhme for Boelcke's death, the feeling he was responsible for killing his best friend would haunt him for the rest of his life.

Boelcke's death affected many more people than his friends and subordinates. As the leading ace of the war, he was a national hero, lionized by generals and nobility as well as the public. His death shocked both the German public and military. His death was so consequential that two generals spoke at his funeral, while Rupprecht, Crown Prince of Bavaria presided. In the wake of this public tumult, Erwin Böhme returned to duty.

=== Böhme soldiers on ===
Böhme shot down two more British planes in November for victories six and seven; an FE.8 pusher of No. 40 Squadron RFC, and a Morane Parasol of No. 3 Squadron RFC flown by highly decorated E. M. Roberts, who crashed within Allied territory. Victim number eight fell the day after Christmas; this "kill" was future ace William Henry Hubbard, who actually escaped though wounded.

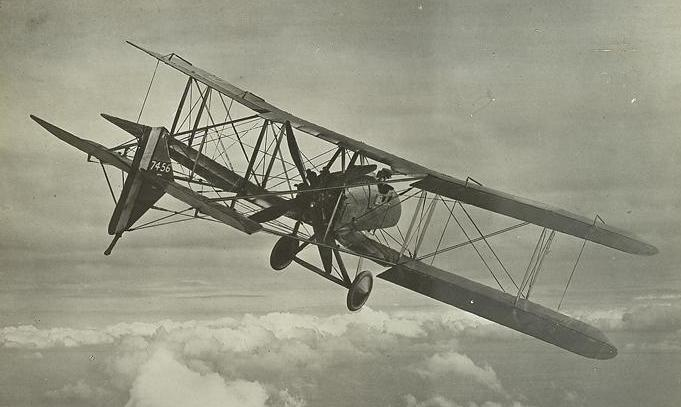
Royal Aircraft Factory FE.8 in flight

Böhme went on leave from 9 January 1917 to 3 February 1917. The day after he returned, he shot down two British planes. For one of his two victims, Böhme shot down another ace, William Curphey, who survived a head wound. On 10 February, Böhme shot down his 12th victim. The following day, as he wrote to Annamarie of his encounter with a Sopwith Pup pilot:

I find myself in a field hospital because of a malevolent Englishman who by all rights should no longer be alive, who treacherously shot me in the left arm. ...I spared him in a burst of sportsmanlike grace—that's what I get for my noblesse.

By this time, Böhme had won the Iron Cross, First Class.

Ribbon of the Hohenzollern Order with Swords.

On 12 March 1917, Böhme received the House Order of Hohenzollern. By early April, he was writing that he and Richthofen were the only survivors from the original roster of Jagdstaffel 2 pilots. As the most momentous month of aerial combat of the war began, Böhme was convalescing. German fighter pilots would shoot down 275 British airplanes during April 1917, inflicting 421 casualties on the British.

Finally released as healed on 8 April, Böhme was assigned to instructor duty until 2 July 1917. He then became the last link in a chain of promotions. First, on 25 June, Richthofen was promoted from squadron command of Jagdstaffel 11 to lead Germany's first fighter wing. Then Kurt Wolff was shifted from command of Jagdstaffel 29 to lead Jagdstaffel 11. Lastly, Böhme was promoted to the squadron leader slot for Jagdstaffel 29.

=== Böhme in command ===
Böhme scored his 13th aerial success leading his new command, downing a Nieuport 17 on 14 July 1917. He had no further victories before being wounded in the hand on 10 August. The injury was minor but disabling; a grazing bullet cut the tendon to his trigger finger. Though unable to fly, Böhme remained in command. Eight days later, he was posted back to Jagdstaffel 2 as its Staffelführer (Squadron Leader).

The prestigious squadron no longer had the array of aces that had flown for Boelcke. Faced with the prospect of leading his new command into battle in Flanders, Böhme transferred out the inept, imported talented replacements, and educated the undertrained. When the squadron did move into Flanders, it began to avoid direct attacks by flying end runs over the North Sea and launching unexpected attacks upon the enemy rear. Carl Bolle, who was Böhme's successor, claimed Böhme was responsible for the squadron's combat performance steadily improving throughout his own tenure from Böhme's death until the Armistice.

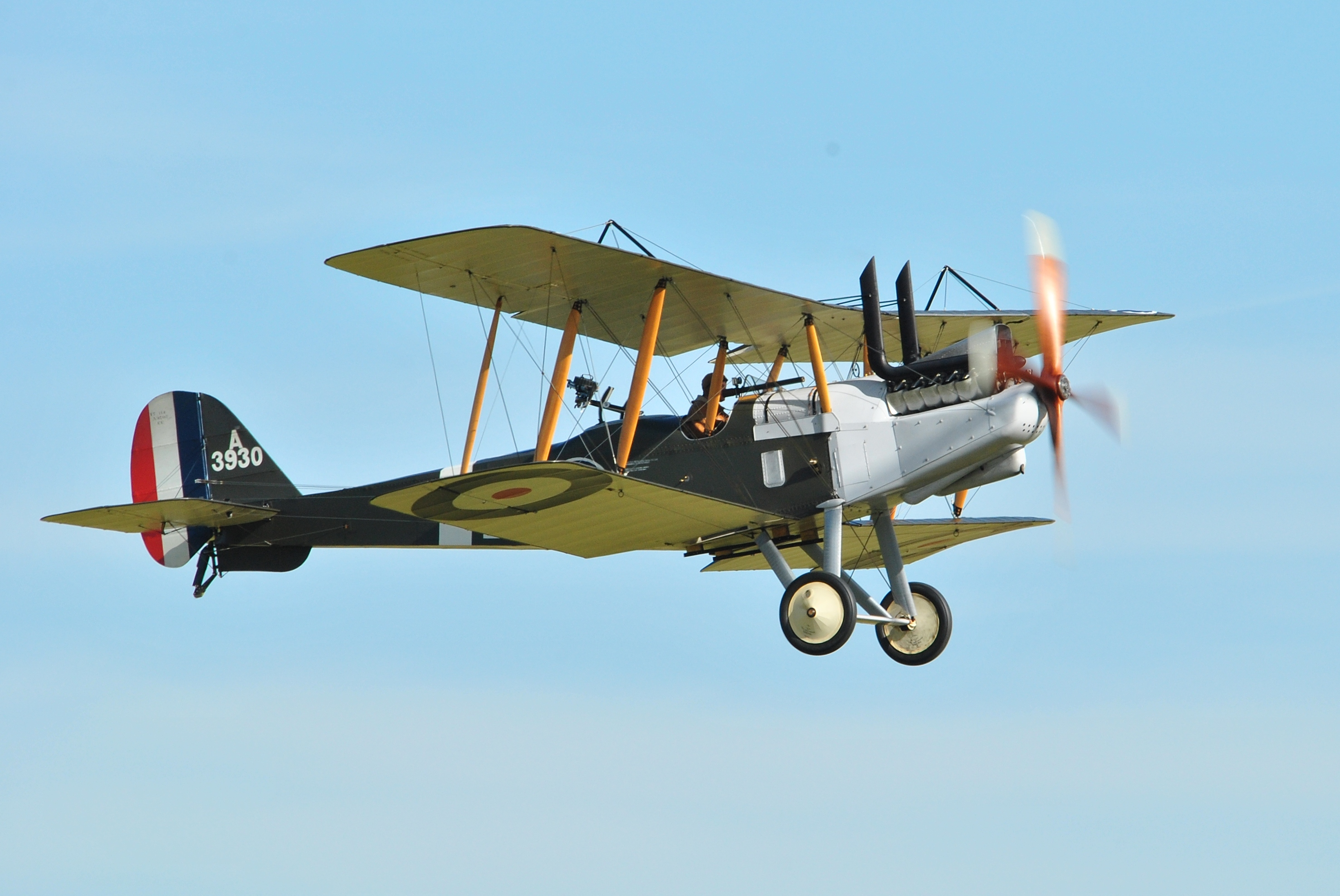
Restored Royal Aircraft Factory R.E.8

On 10 September 1917, a still grounded Böhme traveled back to Berlin to lobby for his squadron. He also managed to visit Annamarie for the first time in a year. Returning to duty on the 18th, he shot down a British RE.8 the next day, and another two days after that to run his victory total to 15. Then, on 23 September, Böhme suffered the loss of another friend, Werner Voss, who was killed battling eight British aces.

During the first half of October, Böhme shot down four more British opponents. Then, on the 16th, his 20th victory was an unusual one. Flying in company with four of his pilots, they surrounded a Nieuport. As Böhme wrote to Annamarie:

I recently came across a Nieuport single-seater at the front, in which our friend was sitting. Naturally, I invited him to pay us a visit. ...I became somewhat more urgent in my efforts to compel him to descend. Yet as he waved at me 'with his hands', I did not want to do anything to him. He then landed safe and sound at our airfield. (Note: Emphasis in the original, per source.)

And so it was that the 20th aerial victory that qualified Böhme for the Pour le Merite was a surrender. Later that month, on 28 October, he attended the first anniversary memorial for his friend Oswald Boelcke in Dessau. The following day, he diverted to Hamburg to visit Annamarie. He proposed marriage to her, and she agreed despite her father's reservations. It was the last time they would see one another.

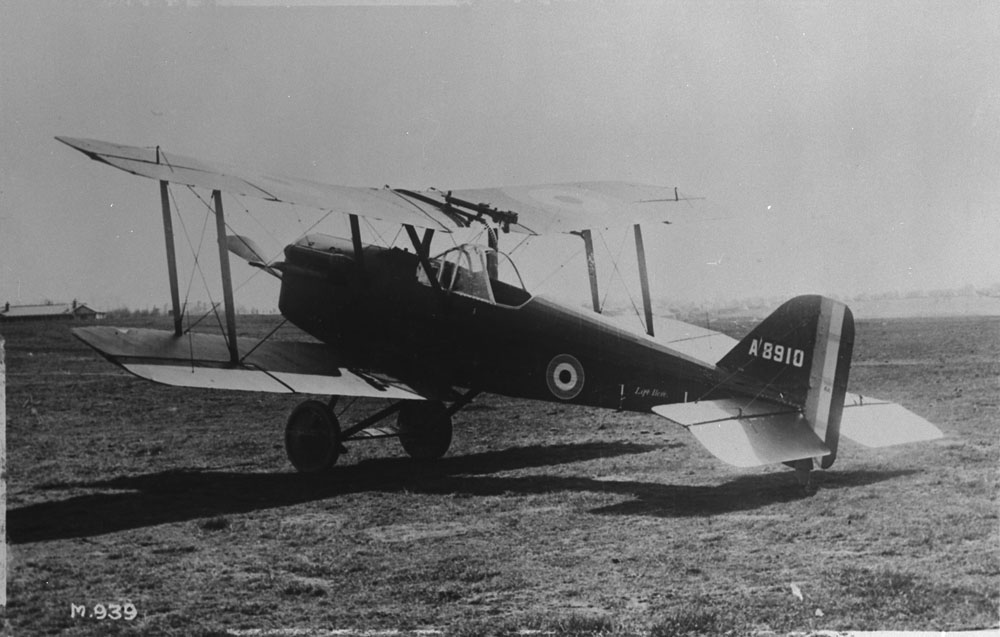
A Royal Aircraft Factory S.E.5

On the return flight to his base on 31 October, Böhme coincidentally joined a patrol from his squadron. Flying with them, he shot down a SE.5a fighter over Zillebeke Lake. New Zealander William Harrison was fished from his plane's wreckage, and joined Böhme for coffee in his squadron's mess before being removed to prison.

Two more victims fell in November, on the 6th and the 20th. Böhme's award of the German Empire's most prestigious order, the Pour le Merite, was approved on 24 November. Böhme and his squadron were very busy flying support missions in the Battle of Cambrai; nevertheless, Böhme was anticipating holiday leave with Annamarie. On the morning of 29 November, Böhme jotted his last note in the prolific correspondence with Annamarie:

My love. Now just a quick affectionate morning greeting! The Staffel is already waiting for me. This evening I will write a proper letter to you. Your Erwin

With no time to post it, he then tucked the letter into his flying garb, and took off on patrol.

=== Death in action ===
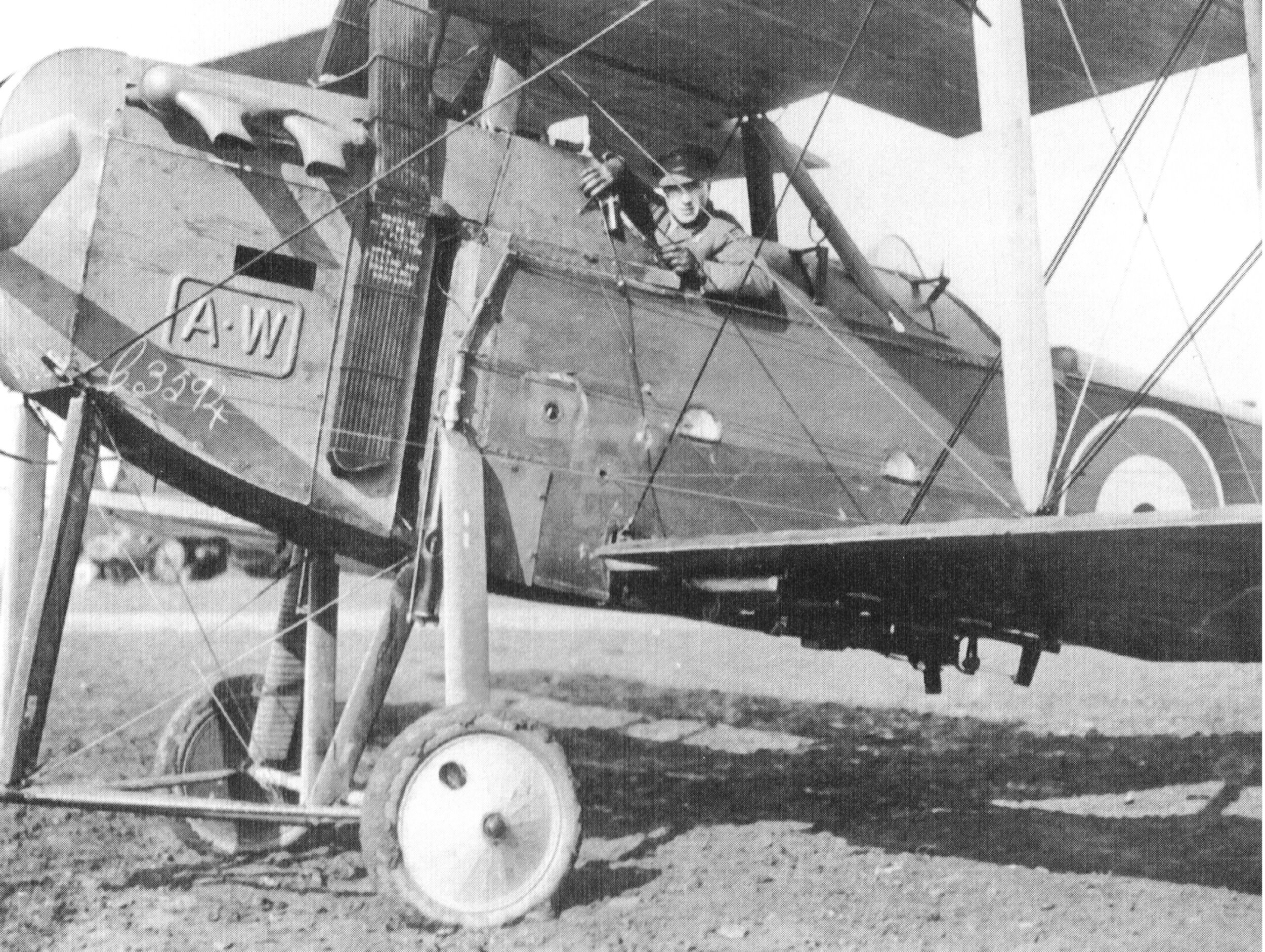
An Armstrong-Whitworth F.K.8, with no observer aboard.

On Böhme's second sortie of the day, he shot down an enemy fighter for his 24th and final accredited victory. After that, he spotted an Armstrong-Whitworth F.K.8 photo reconnaissance two-seater from No. 10 Squadron RFC flown by John Arthur Pattern. Böhme swooped down to about 30 yards (25 meters) range behind the F.K.8. Alerted by his observer's machine gun fire, Pattern yanked the F.K.8 into a split S. As Pattern later described the action:

My sudden turn had done the trick. The Albatros overshot and appeared right in front of me. Because of the relative motion of our two aircraft, he seemed to hang motionless, suspended in midair. I could see the pilot's face as he looked back at me. I sent a two-second burst of Vickers fire into him. His aircraft seemed to flutter, then slid out of sight below my starboard wing. I was pretty sure I had hit his petrol tank....Leycester (Pattern's observer)...was still blazing away...using tracer....When I caught sight of the Albatros again, it was burning like a torch....I saw the German pilot looking down over the side of the cockpit. Then the smoke and flames enveloped him.

Böhme's charred body was retrieved from the wreckage of his Albatros D.Va by British soldiers. Annamarie's letter was removed from his body as a keepsake before the British buried him with full military honors in the cemetery at Keerslaarhoek, Belgium.

Meanwhile, in the official mail on Böhme's desk that awaited his return from flying his last mission was the packet that contained his actual Pour le Merite medal.

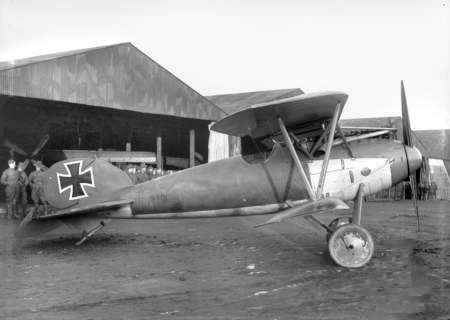
An Albatros DVa

== Legacy ==
In 1921, Böhme's purloined final letter to Annamarie was returned to her. In 1930, Erwin Böhme's letters to her, which she had saved, were published by Professor Johannes Werner in a book entitled, Briefe eines deutschen Kampffliegers an ein junges Mädchen, (Letters From a German Fighter Pilot to a Young Maiden). Professor Werner edited Annamarie's last name to the initial 'B' to protect her privacy.

== Victory list ==
Böhme scored all of his 24 official aerial victories while flying with Jagdstaffel 2 except the first and thirteenth, won while with Kampfstaffel 10 and Jagdstaffel 29 respectively.

Confirmed victories in the list are numbered and listed chronologically. This is a complete listing of all known victories. When casualties for air crews are reported, they are listed pilot first, aerial observers next. Abbreviations in sources were expanded by creating editor.

No.	Date/time	Foe	Result	Location	Casualties
Confirmed but unlisted	2 August 1915	Farman or Nieuport		Western Front	Another two claims filed while with Kagohl 2 were not confirmed
1	Morning of 2 August 1916	Nieuport 12 from 10th Fighter Detachment, Imperial Russian Air Service		Rogistche	Eduard Pulpe, killed in action (KIA)
2	17 September 1916 @ 07:45 hours	Sopwith 1 1/2 Strutter serial number A1913 from No. 70 Squadron RFC	Crashed	Northwest of Hervilly, France	2nd Lt. Oswald Nixon KIA; 2nd Lt. Ronald Wood wounded in action/prisoner of war(WIA/POW)
Unconfirmed	23 September 1916 @ 09:55 hours	Martinsyde G.100 s/n 7475 from No. 27 Squadron RFC	Crashlanded	Hervilly, France	Lt. Eric James Roberts KIA
3	10 October 1916 @ 09:50 hours	Airco DH.2 s/n 4856 from No. 18 Squadron RFC	Wrecked and written off	Longueval, France	Lt. Charles Gerschell Shaumer unhurt; Lt. L. Hardinge unhurt
4	20 October 1916 @ 10:30 hours	Royal Aircraft Factory FE.2b s/n 4867 from No. 11 Squadron RFC		Monchy	2nd Lt. Norman Rausch de Pomeroy KIA; 2nd Lt. William Black WIA/POW
5	22 October 1916 @ 11:50 hours	Sopwith 1 1/2 Strutter s/n 7786 from No. 45 Squadron RFC		Les Boeufs	2nd Lt. Oliver John Wade KIA; 2nd Lt. William Johnson Thuell KIA
6	9 November 1916 @ 15:10 hours	Royal Aircraft Factory FE.8 s/n 6409 from No. 40 Squadron RFC	Forced landing	Arleux, France	2nd Lt. Herbert Farmer Evans WIA/POW
7	22 November 1916 @ 14:10 hours	Morane-Saulnier L s/n A248 of No. 43 Squadron RFC	Dived into British territory	Longevual	Lt. Elmer Peter Roberts WIA; Captain Graham Lauder Watson WIA
8	26 December 1916 @ 15:15 hours	Royal Aircraft Factory BE.2c from No. 5 Squadron RFC	Dived into British territory	Courcelette, France	2nd Lt. William Henry Hubbard WIA
9	7 January 1917 @ 12:30 hours	Airco DH.2 s/n 7851 from No. 32 Squadron RFC	Shot down	Beugny, France	2nd Lt. Ethelbert Godwin Stockwell Wagner KIA
10	4 February 1917 @ 15:05 hours	Airco DH.2 s/n A2536 from No. 32 Squadron RFC		Sally-le-Transloy	2nd Lt. William Curphey WIA
11	4 February 1917 @ 15:30 hours	Royal Aircraft Factory BE.2e s/n 7105 from No. 15 Squadron RFC	Crashed	Hébuterne, France	Sergeant Frederick James Shaw KIA; 2nd Lt. George William Bathurst Bradford
12	10 February 1917 @ 12:20 hours	Airco DH.2 from No. 32 Squadron RFC	Downed inside British lines	West of Gommecourt, France	2nd Lt. Arthur Vincent Howard Gompertz survived
13	14 July 1917 @ 07:20 hours	Nieuport 17 s/n A6783 from No. 40 Squadron RFC		Capelle, Belgium	2nd Lt. Godfrey Davis POW
14	19 September 1917 @ 10:47 hours	Royal Aircraft Factory RE.8 s/n B5012 from No. 9 Squadron RFC	Crashed in British territory	Boesinghem	2nd Lt. Henry Little Devlin KIA; 2nd Lt. Frederick Adam Wright KIA
15	21 September 1917 @ 08:52 hours	Royal Aircraft Factory RE.8 s/n A3617 from No. 53 Squadron RFC		Koman	Captain Robert Nicholas Fenwick Mills KIA; Lt. William Angus Browne KIA
16	5 October 1917 @ 08:15 hours	Bristol F.2B s/n kB1133 from No. 20 Squadron RFC	Crashlanded	Dadizeele	Captain Donald Dacre Walrond-Skinner WIA/POW; Private Francis J. Johns WIA/POW
17	10 October 1917 @ 07:25 hours	Nieuport 27 s/n B6791 from No. 29 Squadron RFC	Forced to land; wrecked	Zillebeke	2nd Lt. Gerald Benson Wigle WIA
18	13 October 1917 @ 08:50 hours	Sopwith Pup s/n B1800 from No. 54 Squadron RFC		Southwest of Koekelare, Belgium	2nd Lt. Frederick William Gibbes KIA
19	14 October 1917 @ 07:42 hours	Nieuport 27 s/n B6778 from No. 29 Squadron RFC	Crashed and wrecked; observed by German ground troops to be just within the British lines	Ypres, Belgium	2nd Lt. Henry Douglas MacPherson KIA
20	16 October 1917 @ 09:25 hours	Nieuport 17 s/n B3578 from No. 29 Squadron RFC	Surrendered; landed on Böhme's home airfield	Magermeirie	2nd Lt. Frederick John Ortweiler POW
21	31 October 1917 @ 17:15 hours	Royal Aircraft Factory SE.5a s/n B544 from No. 84 Squadron RFC		Zillebeke Lake	2nd Lt. George Robert Gray died of wounds
22	6 November 1917 @ 11:50 hours	Sopwith Camel s/n B2408 from No. 65 Squadron RFC	Crashed heavily	Molen	2nd Lt. William L. Harrison WIA/POW
23	20 November 1917 @ 10:30 hours	Nieuport 17 from 5me Escadrille de Chasse, Belgian Air Component		Osterke, Belgium	First sergeant Leon Andre Robert Ciselet KIA.
24	29 November 1917 @ 12:55 hours	Sopwith Camel?	Unknown	Zonnebeke	

Sources: Background material from Franks et al. 1993, p. 78. Details garnered from Franks and Giblin 2003 are cited separately.
