= August Burkard =

German flying ace

- Born: Peter August Burkard; 25 October 1894; Frankfurt, Hesse, Germany
- Died: Unknown
- Military career
- Allegiance: Germany
- Branch: Aviation
- Rank: Leutnant
- Unit: Jagdstaffel 29
- Awards: Iron Cross

Leutnant Peter August Burkard (born 25 October 1894) was a German World War I flying ace credited with six aerial victories.

He was a chemistry student during the war and later earned his doctorate.

== Military career ==
- See also Aerial victory standards of World War I

On 1 June 1918, Burkard was posted to Jagdstaffel 29, a Fokker D.VII fighter squadron commanded by Harald Auffarth. On the 27th, Burkard staked his first victory claim, which was unconfirmed. He also received the Iron Cross First Class that day. Subsequently, he would score six confirmed victories between 8 August and 16 October 1918.
