= Louis Fleeming Jenkin =

- Born: 22 August 1895; London, England
- Died: 11 September 1917 (aged 22); Western Front
- Burial place: Arras Flying Service Memorial
- Military career
- Allegiance: United Kingdom
- Branch: British Army
- Service years: 1914–1917
- Rank: Captain
- Units: Loyal Regiment (North Lancashire); Royal Flying Corps
- Conflicts: World War I
- Awards: Military Cross & Bar

Captain Louis Fleeming Jenkin, Military Cross & Bar, (22 August 1895 – 11 September 1917) was a First World War flying ace credited with 22 victories.

== Early life and service ==
Jenkin was born in London, England, on 22 August 1895 to Austin Fleeming Jenkin and Betty Jenkin. He originally served with the 9th (Service) Battalion of the Loyal Regiment (North Lancashire). In the opening days of the First World War, on 24 September 1914, he was commissioned as a temporary second lieutenant in that unit.

== Royal Flying Corps ==
Jenkin transferred to the Royal Flying Corps on 19 April 1917. He was posted to No. 1 Squadron on 15 May 1917. The squadron had just equipped for fighter operations with Nieuport 17s in February.

On 23 May, Jenkin scored his initial victory. In less than a month, he was an ace, winning his fifth triumph on 8 June. By the end of June, his tally stood at 11. He nearly doubled that in July, ending the month with 20 victories. He was given command of a flight on 31 July, and promoted to temporary captain. He was awarded the Military Cross on 16 August 1917, the citation read:

T./Lt. Louis Fleeming Jenkin, Gen. List and R.F.C. For conspicuous gallantry and devotion to duty. Whilst on offensive patrol he has continually shown the greatest dash and determination in attacking enemy aircraft in superior numbers, destroying some and bringing others down out of control.

He had no further victories until early September, when he drove down enemy planes a week apart, on the 4th and 11th. He was shot down later in the day on the 11th, after his morning victory, by Otto Schmidt of Jasta 29. The award of Bar to his MC was announced on 17 September, the citation read:

T./Lt. Louis Fleeming Jenkin, M.C., Gen. List and R.F.C. For conspicuous gallantry and devotion to duty in continually attacking hostile aircraft at close range, destroying some and driving others down out of control. His dash and offensive spirit have at all times been admirable. (M.C. gazetted 16th August, 1917.)

A final summary of his victories is two enemy airplanes destroyed on fire; six others destroyed singlehanded; two destroyed in cooperation with another pilot; twelve driven down out of control. He is commemorated on the Arras Flying Memorial.
