= Hans Böhning =

- Born: 6 July 1893; Kingdom of Bavaria
- Died: 20 October 1934 (aged 41)
- Military career
- Allegiance: Germany
- Branch: Artillery; aviation
- Rank: Leutnant
- Units: Flieger-Abteilung (Artillerie) 290; Jagdstaffel 36; Bavarian Jagdstaffel 76; Jagdstaffel 79
- Commands: Jagdstaffel 32
- Awards: Iron Cross First and Second Class

Leutnant Hans Böhning, Iron Cross, was a German World War flying ace credited with 17 aerial victories. He served the German Empire first as an artilleryman, then as an aerial observer for artillery, as a fighter pilot, and finally as the Staffelführer of a fighter squadron.

He would survive the war and died in a gliding accident on 20 October 1934.

== Early life and ground service ==
Hans Böhning was born on 6 July 1893 in the Kingdom of Bavaria. Early in World War I, he served in Bavaria's Field Artillery Regiment No. 13.

== Aviation service ==
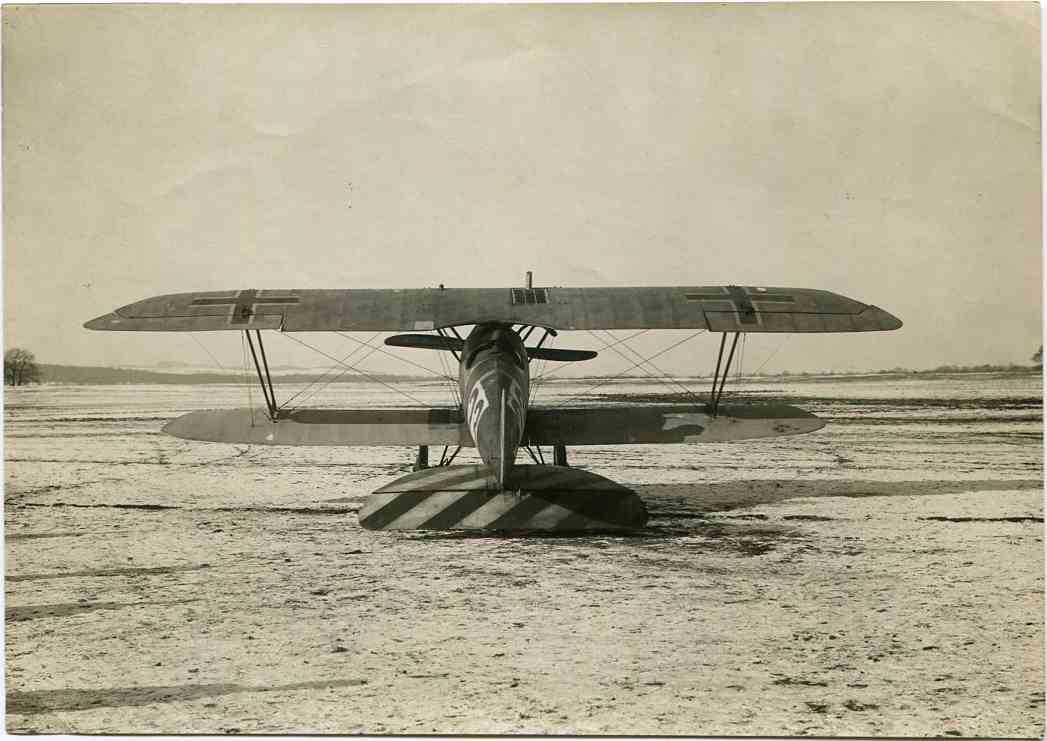
Böhning began his career in a Pfalz D.IIIa like this one.)

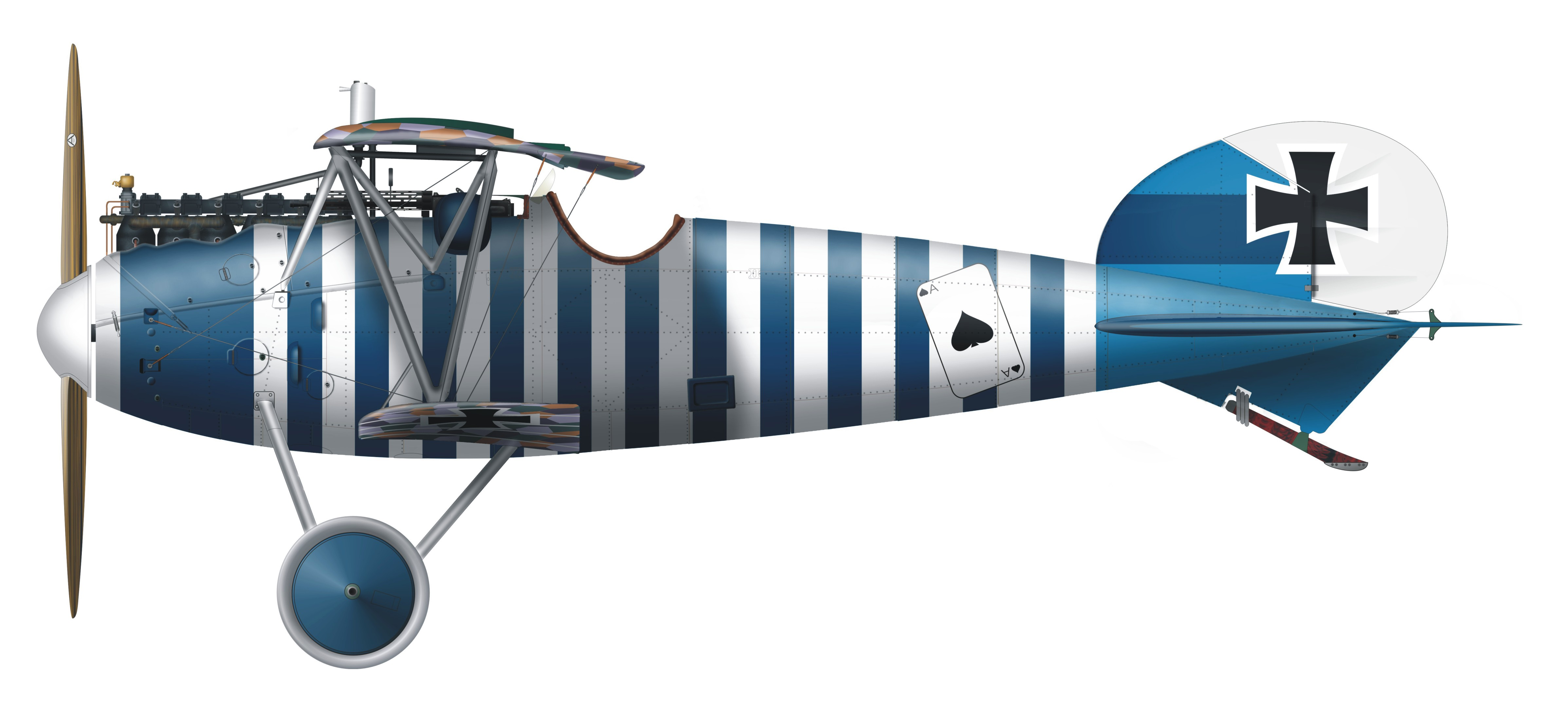
The later Albatros D.Va of Leutnant Böhning, Jasta 79

Böhning made the transition to aviation in 1916. He began his flying career with Feldflieger Abteilung (Field Flier Detachment) 290, which was an artillery cooperation unit, on 26 April 1917. He transferred from FA(A) 290 on 3 July 1917, to take training as a fighter pilot. He survived an accident on 17 July 1917. Upon completion of training, Böhning was transferred to Royal Prussian Jagdstaffel 36. He scored his first victory with them on 23 August 1917. He scored his fourth triumph with the unit on 27 October 1917. He was then transferred to Royal Bavarian Jagdstaffel 76 and scored his fifth win over opposing fighter planes on 1 December 1917. By February, 1918, he had transferred to another Bavarian squadron, Jagdstaffel 79.

He now began his greatest string of victories while flying a Pfalz D.III with his initials painted aft of the cockpit. He would upgrade to a newer Albatros D.Va with a fuselage ringed by blue and white stripes and decked by the ace of spades, its upper tail surfaces bearing both light and dark blue stripes. Between 22 March 1918 and 18 September, he tallied another dozen victories, including three over enemy observation balloons. On 20 September 1918, he was wounded while using a Fokker D.VII to fight British Airco DH.9s over Soriel. On 1 November 1918, he was selected to command Bavarian Jagdstaffel 32; the war ended 11 days after his appointment. He was awarded both classes of the Iron Cross during his service.

== Post war life ==
After the war, he took on sport aviation and gliding. He took part in the F.A.I. International Tourist Plane Contest - Challenge International de Tourisme 1930, taking the 34th position (for 35 classified competitors, of 60 starting ones). Hans Böhning was killed in a glider accident on 20 October 1934.

== Postwar tribute ==
During its restoration in 2013, Old Rhinebeck Aerodrome's airworthy reproduction Albatros D.V was changed from Eduard Ritter von Schleich's color scheme to that of Böhning's, when he flew for Jasta 76, with its prominent Rautenflagge rhombus-patterned Bavarian light-blue/white checkerboard state colors for its rear fuselage.
