= Otto Schmidt (aviator) =

German World War I fighter ace (1885-1944)

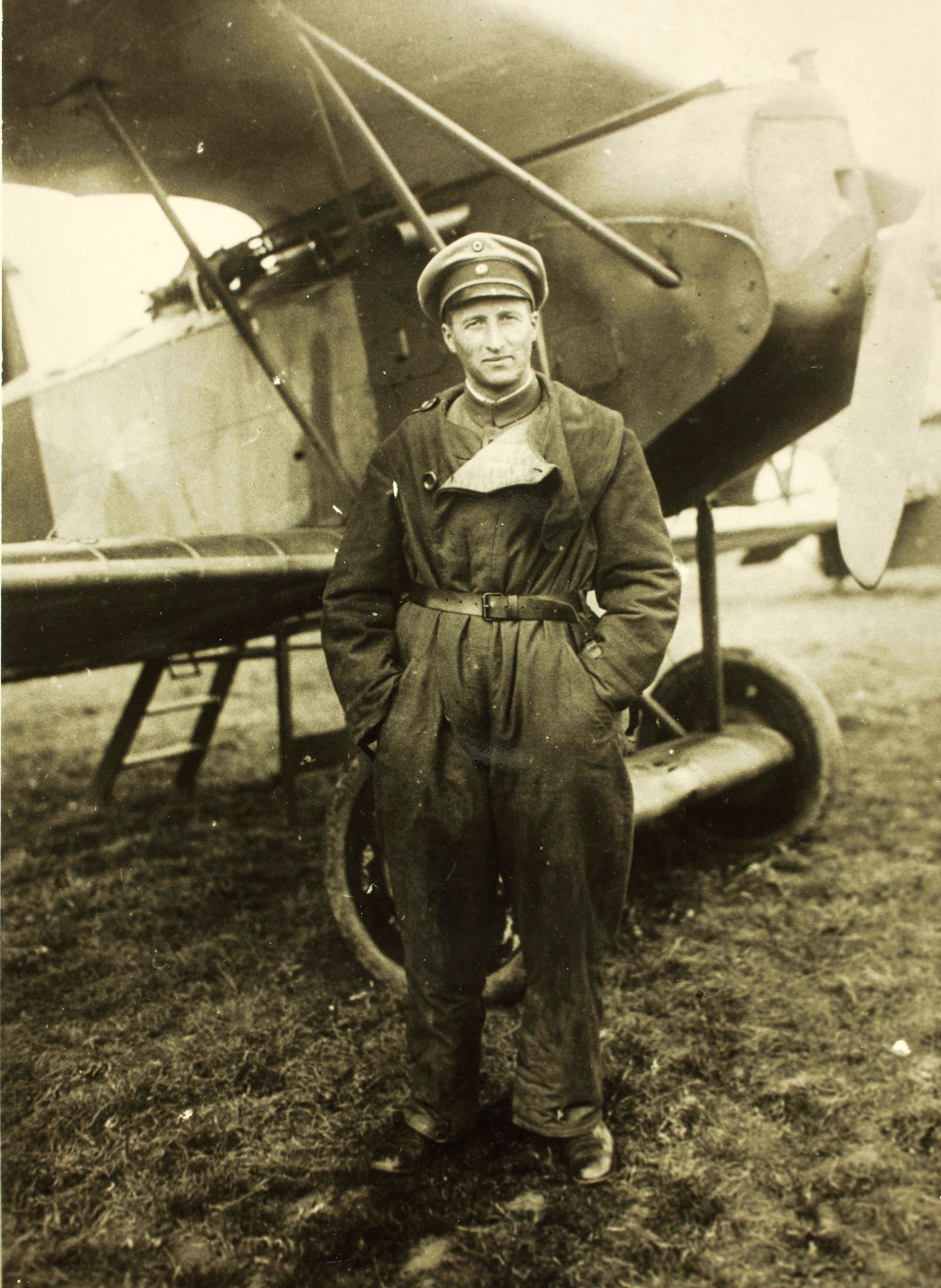
- World War One German Aviator Otto Schmidt
- Born: 23 March 1885; Neunkirchen, Saarland, Germany
- Died: 24 July 1944 (aged 59); Neunkirchen, Gau Westmark, Nazi Germany
- Military career
- Allegiance: Germany
- Branch: Flying service
- Service years: 1909–1910; 1914–1918
- Rank: Oberleutnant
- Units: Flieger-Abteilung (Artillerie) 25, Jagdstaffel 7, Jagdstaffel 32, Jasta 29, Jagdstaffel 5,
- Commands: Jagdstaffel 32, Jasta 29, Jagdstaffel 5, Jagdgruppe II
- Awards: Royal House Order of Hohenzollern, Iron Cross First and Second Class

Doctor Oberleutnant Otto Schmidt HOH, IC (23 March 1885 – 24 July 1944) was a German World War I fighter ace credited with 20 aerial victories, including eight against enemy observation balloons. He commanded three different jagdstaffeln (squadrons) as well as a jagdgruppe (fighter wing).

After schooling that led him to a doctorate, he performed his military service in 1909–1910. He was an executive in his family's brewery until 1914. Returning to service, he fought in the early stages of World War I and was wounded. After being reassigned to a reserve unit and designated as an ordnance officer, he applied for pilot's training. The aviation service accepted him as an aerial observer in March 1916. He scored two victories while an observer, and survived being shot down.

After being trained as a pilot beginning in October 1916, he was assigned as a fighter pilot to Jasta 7. As his personal victory score mounted, he was appointed to various command positions, including that of one of history's first fighter wings. After ten victories, he was severely wounded on 18 October 1917 while engaged in a highly hazardous attack on an observation balloon. He returned to wing command while on crutches in July 1918, and eventually resumed his string of aerial victories the following month. At war's ending, his Blue Max award was still pending when the order was abolished by the German Empire's defeat.

== Early life and infantry service ==
Otto Schmidt was born in Neunkirchen, Saarland, on 23 March 1885. He was the second son of a brewery owner. Young Otto Schmidt began his education in Kreuznach. His secondary schooling complete, he studied in Heidelberg, Paris, and Leipzig. He earned a doctorate at the latter.

Following a year's military service, he became an officer in Hussar Regiment 9 in 1910. He then wanted to become a teacher, but the death of his elder brother led him to running the family brewery. At the start of World War I, he was serving in a Jäger Cavalry Regiment 12. Three months into the war, Schmidt was transferred to Jäger Infantry Regiment 120 as their adjutant. He went into battle with them as a company commander, and was wounded in action in March 1915. After his wounding, he served with a reserve regiment, being promoted to oberleutnant on 9 October. Further assignments saw him become an ordnance officer. After applying for pilot's training, he then transferred to aviation as an aerial observer in March 1916.

== Aerial service and victories ==
=== As an aerial observer ===
After a fortnight's trial as an observer with Flieger-Abteilung (Artillerie) 25, Schmidt was forwarded for official training. In June 1916, he returned to the unit. He flew over 150 sorties for them. He scored his first two aerial victories while still flying artillery direction missions for FA(A) 25. On 20 June 1916, he downed an enemy aircraft; on 11 July 1916, he shot down an enemy observation balloon. His pilot on this latter occasion was future ace Renatus Theiller, who was credited with the second of his 12 victories. Soon afterwards, he was the victim of a downing. However, on 23 October 1916, Schmidt began pilot's training.

=== As a pilot and Staffelführer ===
In March 1917, he was transferred to Royal Prussian Jasta 7. Schmidt continued his career as a balloon buster, by shooting one down on both 25 and 27 June 1917.

Schmidt took temporary command of Royal Bavarian Jasta 32, from 30 June to 19 August 1917. During this period, he downed a Spad and another balloon for his fifth and sixth victories, becoming an ace in the process. However, he was shifted out of this command because he was not Bavarian.

Schmidt then moved on to temporarily command Royal Prussian Jasta 29 from 19 August to 18 October 1917. While leading this squadron as Staffelführer, he scored four more victories. His eighth victory, on 11 September, was over Captain Louis Fleeming Jenkin, whom Schmidt killed. On 19 September, Schmidt was awarded the Knight's Cross with Swords of the Royal House Order of Hohenzollern.

=== As a group commander ===
By 28 September 1917, he had run his victory total to ten; he was subsequently appointed to command of Jagdgruppe II. This fighter wing consisted of Jastas 7, 33, and 35, in addition to Jasta 29.

Schmidt was severely wounded by ground fire on 18 October 1917 while attacking a balloon. When he came out of the hospital on crutches, he did not return to Jasta 29; instead, after his recovery, he was appointed to command Royal Prussian Jasta 5 on 3 July 1918.

Royal Prussian Jasta 5 was re-equipped with new Fokker D.VII fighters. Under Schmidt's leadership, the squadron would notch up over 300 aerial victories, sparked by such aces as Otto Konnecke, Josef Mai, and Fritz Rumey. On 8 August, Jasta 5 became part of Jagdgruppe II; Schmidt was also reappointed commander of JG II while maintaining his post with Jasta 5. Other squadrons attached to JG 2 at this time included Jastas 34, 37, and 46.

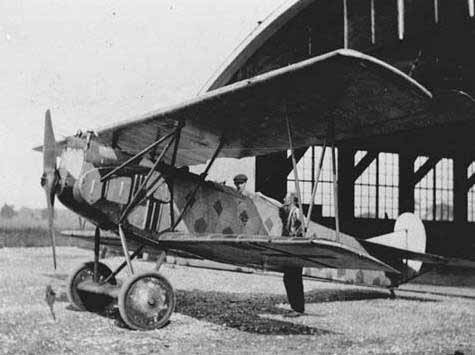
A Fokker D.VII, such as Schmidt flew.

Schmidt reopened his victory list by shooting down a balloon on 26 August 1918. He then accumulated nine more victories by 4 November, bringing his total to 20. His final tally was twelve enemy airplanes shot down, and eight observation balloons.

Schmidt had already won both classes of the Iron Cross, as well as the Hohenzollern, but was recommended for Germany's highest decoration for valor, the Blue Max, or Pour le Mérite, at the end of October 1918. However, the war's end left it unconfirmed; some of his victory claims may similarly been left uncredited. The records do show at least three unconfirmed claims by Schmidt.

== After World War I ==
Doctor Otto Schmidt died on 24 August 1944 in his native Neunkirchen, Saarland.
