= Werner Preuss =

- Born: 21 September 1894; Gardelegen (Altmark)
- Died: 6 March 1919 (aged 24); Westerronfelder Heide, Schleswig-Holstein
- Military career
- Allegiance: German Empire
- Branch: Infantry, aerial service
- Rank: Leutnant
- Units: Infantry Regiment No. 85; Jagdstaffel 66
- Conflicts: World War I
- Awards: Royal House Order of Hohenzollern; Iron Cross First Class

Leutnant Werner Preuss (21 September 1894 – 6 March 1919), Royal House Order of Hohenzollern, Iron Cross, was a World War I fighter ace credited with 22 victories.

== Early life and military service ==
Werner Preuss was the son of a tax inspector. He graduated from high school in Rendsburg, Holstein on 6 August 1914. Eight days later, he volunteered for service with Infantry Regiment No. 85.

On 15 May 1915, he attended an officer's training course. He returned to the front from this course as a sergeant. On 16 January 1916, he was commissioned an officer. On 25 May 1916, he was severely wounded. It would take him a year to recover from paralysis.

Upon his recovery, he enlisted in the Luftstreitkräfte. He was forwarded to pilots training in Poznan on 20 September 1917. He passed his first pilot's test on 7 October, and the second one on 15 October, setting a record. On the 26th, he was sent to the Western Front via a short stopover in Courland, as an infantry cooperation pilot flying reconnaissance. He arrived on the front in December 1917.

He began flying missions in January 1918. He also requested and received a transfer to the Royal Prussian Jagdstaffel 66.

== Career of aerial victories ==
Preuss won for the first time on 4 June 1918. He did not score again until 1 July. He then ran up a tally of seven for the month; win number eight came on 22 July.

His next successful claim was against a Spad on 26 August. He was victorious three more times during the last few days of the month. His winning string continued into September with four more victims joining his list, the last on 14 September. By now, he had 16 accredited claims. He was awarded the Royal House Order of Hohenzollern on the 19th.

In October, he shot down six more enemy planes, to bring his total to 22. His victories were split evenly between fighters and reconnaissance planes.

With his twentieth victory, he qualified for Germany's highest decoration for valor, the Prussian Pour le Mérite. He was nominated in early November. One of the extant photographs, a formal portrait, shows him wearing a Blue Max. However, there is no surviving evidence of its award. A number of nominees lost out on their award when the Kaiser resigned on 9 November, but his name is not recorded among them. However, this is the most likely explanation for him not receiving the medal he earned.

== List of victories ==
Confirmed victories in this list are numbered and listed chronologically, rather than in order of confirmation.

No.	Date	Foe	Location
1	4 June 1918	SPAD	Chateau Thierry, France
2	1 July 1918	Nieuport	
3	3 July 1918	SPAD	
4	4 July 1918	SPAD	Villers-Cotterêts, France
5	17 July 1918	Bréguet 14	
6	18 July 1918	Bréguet 14	
7	19 July 1918	Bréguet 14	
8	22 July 1918	SPAD two-seater	La Ferté-Milon, France
9	26 August 1918	SPAD two-seater	Soissons, France
10	29 August 1918	SPAD	Venizel, France
11	29 August 1918	SPAD	Missy-aux-Bois, France
12	31 August 1918	SPAD	Bagneux, France
13	2 September 1918	Bréguet 14	Bagneux, France
14	4 September 1918	Two-seater	Southeast of Crécy-au-Mont, France
15	5 September 1918	Bréguet 14	Villeneuve, France
16	14 September 1918	Two-seater	
17	1 October 1918	SPAD	
18	3 October 1918	Bréguet 14	Jouy, France
19	8 October 1918 @ 1800 hours	French two-seater	Pinon, France
20	14 October 1918	Caudron R.1	South of Soissons, France
21	21 October 1918	SPAD	Missy
22	29 October 1918	Salmson 2A2	Fay-le-Sec-Ferme

== Post World War I ==
Upon the armistice ending the war, Preuss led his squadron to Lübeck. There he resigned his commission.

On 13 February 1919, he joined the air component of the Schleswig-Holstein Freikorps. On 6 March, he was killed in an air crash near the site of his alma mater, Rendsburg.
