= Jagdstaffel 29 =

Jasta 29
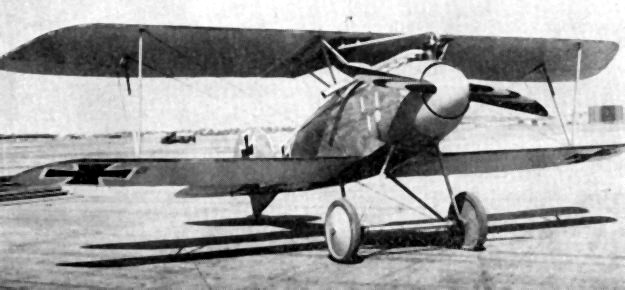
- Albatross D.III
- Active: 1916–1918
- Country: German Empire
- Branch: Luftstreitkräfte
- Type: Fighter squadron
- Engagements: World War I

Royal Prussian Jagdstaffel 29, commonly abbreviated to Jasta 29, was a "hunting group" (i.e., fighter squadron) of the Luftstreitkräfte, the air arm of the Imperial German Army during World War I. The squadron would score 76 aerial victories during the war, at the cost of 13 of their pilots killed in action, two killed in flying accidents, 12 wounded in action, one injured in a flying accident and one taken prisoner.

== History ==
Royal Prussian Jagdstaffel 29 was formed on 28 December 1916 at the Fliegerersatz-Abteilung (Replacement Detachment) 5 training facility at Hannover in Germany. It scored its first victory on 16 March 1917, when Wilhelm Allmenröder incinerated an enemy observation balloon. The fledgling squadron would be blooded just under a month later, suffering its first casualty on 11 April 1917. Jasta 29 would serve to the war's end.

== Commanding officers (Staffelführer) ==
1. Hauptmann Hermann Palmer: 31 January 1917 – 5 February 1917
2. Leutnant Ludwig Dornheim: transferred from Jasta 5 on 5 February 1917 – 29 April 1917 (KIA)
3. Leutnant Kurt Wolff: transferred from Jasta 11 on 6 May 1917 – 2 July 1917
4. Leutnant Erwin Böhme: 2 July 1917 – 18 August 1917
5. Oberleutnant Otto Schmidt: transferred from Jasta 32 on 19 August 1917 – 18 October 1917 (WIA)
6. Oberleutnant Harald Auffarth: transferred from Jasta 18 on 19 October 1917 – promoted to command Jagdgruppe 3 on 28 September 1918
7. Leutnant Hans Holthusen: transferred from Jasta 30 on 28 September 1918 – to the end of the war on 11 November 1918

== Aerodromes ==
1. Juniville, France: 15 February 1917 – 21 June 1917
2. Mons-en-Pevelle: 22 June 1917 – 27 June 1917
3. Bersée, France 28 June 1917 – 17 July 1917
4. Handzaeme: 18 July 1917 – 31 July 1918
5. Thourout: 1 August 1917 – 13 September 1917
6. Aertrycke: 14 September 1917 – 27 November 1917
7. Émerchicourt, France: 28 November 1917 – 13 December 1917
8. Bellincamps: 14 December 1917 – 30 March 1918
9. Phalempin, France: 31 March 1918 – 12 April 1918
10. Gondecourt, France: 13 April 1918 – 17 August 1918
11. Bellincamps: 18 August 1918 – 28 September 1918
12. Kruishoutem, Belgium: 29 September 1918 – 5 October 1918
13. Aertrycke: 6 October 1918 – 11 November 1918

== Notable members ==
- Kurt Wolff, Pour le Merite, Royal House Order of Hohenzollern, Iron Cross
- Erwin Böhme, Pour le Merite, Royal House Order of Hohenzollern, Iron Cross
- Harald Auffarth, Royal House Order of Hohenzollern, Iron Cross, Silver Wound Badge
- Otto Schmidt, Royal House Order of Hohenzollern, Iron Cross
- August Burkard, Iron Cross
- Karl Pech
- Fritz Kieckhäfer
- Siegfried Westphal
- Günther Schuster
- Eugen Siempelkamp
- Hermann Dahlmann, Iron Cross
- Karl Gallwitz, Iron Cross
- Josef Hohly
- Max Kuhne
- Werner Voss

== Aircraft ==
- Albatros D.III
- Fokker D.VII
- Pfalz D.III

== Operations ==
Jasta 29 began operations at Juniville on 15 February 1917 in support of 3rd Armee.The jasta shifted its base of operations on or about 16 April, to support the 1st Armee. On 22 June 1917, Jasta 29 moved to the 6th Armee front. On 28 November, it was reposted to operate with the 2nd Armee. On 14 December, the squadron moved again, to support the 6th Armee once more.

On 8 August 1918, Jasta 29 once again supported the 2nd Armee at Peronne. The air unit moved to support 4th Armee on 30 September for its final operational tasking.
