= Boulin =

- Commune
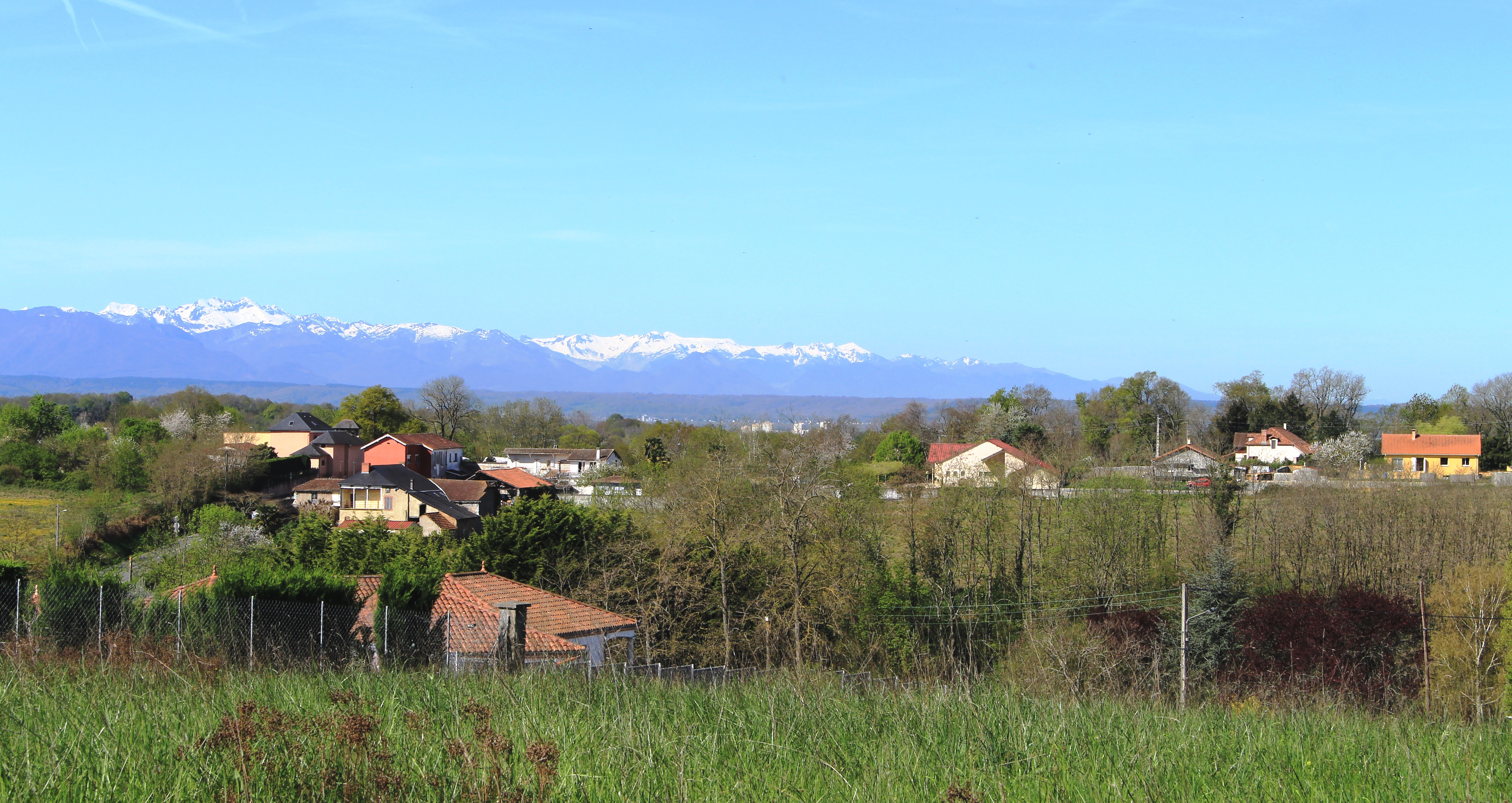
- View of Boulin

- Coat of arms
- Location of Boulin
- Location within France Location within Occitanie
- Coordinates: 43°15′07″N 0°08′23″E
- Country: France
- Region: Occitania
- Department: Hautes-Pyrénées
- Arrondissement: Tarbes
- Canton: Les Coteaux

Government
  - Mayor (2020–2026): Richard Capel
- Area^{1}: 2.52 km^{2} (0.97 sq mi)
- Elevation: 410 m (1,350 ft)
- Highest elevation: 414 m (1,358 ft)
- Lowest elevation: 289 m (948 ft)
- Population (2023): 311
  - Density: 123/km^{2} (320/sq mi)
- Time zone: UTC+01:00 (CET)
  - Summer (DST): UTC+02:00 (CEST)
- INSEE/Postal code: 65104 /65350
- ^{1} French Land Register data, which excludes lakes, ponds, glaciers > 1 km^{2} (0.386 sq mi or 247 acres) and river estuaries.

Boulin (French pronunciation: [bulɛ̃]; Occitan: Bolin) is a commune in the Hautes-Pyrénées department in southwestern France.

== Population ==
Historical population
Year	Pop.	±% p.a.
1968	94	—
1975	101	+1.03%
1982	240	+13.16%
1990	253	+0.66%
1999	280	+1.13%
2007	297	+0.74%
2012	269	−1.96%
2017	288	+1.37%
2023	311	+1.29%
Source: INSEE

== See also ==
- Communes of the Hautes-Pyrénées department
