= William Curphey =

British flying ace (1895–1917)

William George Sellar Curphey
- Born: 1895; London, England
- Died: 15 May 1917 (aged 21–22) near Cagnicourt, France
- Burial place: Caberet-Rouge British Cemetery, Souchez, Pas de Calais, France
- Military career
- Allegiance: United Kingdom
- Branch: British Army
- Service years: 1914–1917
- Rank: Captain
- Nickname: Growler
- Units: Princess Charlotte of Wales's (Royal Berkshire Regiment); No. 32 Squadron RFC
- Conflicts: World War I
- Awards: Military Cross & Bar

Captain William George Sellar Curphey MC* (1895 – 15 May 1917) was a British World War I flying ace credited with six aerial victories.

== Early life and entry into military ==
Curphey was born in Glasgow, Scotland to Mr. and Mrs. William Salvador Curphey, who at the time of his death were residing at 87 Canfield Gardens, Hampstead, Middlesex, England; the elder William Curphey was a civil servant. The younger William Curphey was educated at Glasgow Academy, at University College School, Hampstead, and at King's College London. He belonged to the Officers' Training Corps at London University.

== Military career ==
=== Professional advancement ===
Curphey enlisted into the Princess Charlotte of Wales's (Royal Berkshire Regiment) in the early days of World War I. His commission as temporary second lieutenant in that regiment was gazetted 16 November 1914. A promotion to temporary lieutenant followed on 1 June 1915. On 15 July 1916, Curphey was transferred from the Berkshires to the General List of the Royal Flying Corps. He was advanced from pilot officer to flight commander with an accompanying promotion to temporary captain on 8 January 1917.

=== Aerial success ===
Curphey was one of the original pilots of 32 Squadron, which was posted with its Airco DH.2s to the Battle of the Somme in France on 28 May 1916. He scored six wins between 22 August 1916 and 7 February 1917; one of them was shared with fellow ace James Robb. On 4 February, he suffered a slight head wound and was forced to land by Leutnant Erwin Böhme; this was Böhme's tenth victory.

== Death in combat ==
On 14 May 1917, Curphey was one of a trio of patrollers who attacked three German observation balloons. Six Albatros fighters then attacked them. An Albatros on Curphey's tail became Saint Cyprian Tayler's second victim. Curphey was then shot down by Leutnant Franz Walz as the German ace's seventh victory. Curphey's plane was 20 feet from a crashlanding when it burst into flames. He died of the resulting burns the following day, in a German field hospital in Bouchain. At the time of his death, Curphey had a promotion to major pending; the new rank would have removed him from flight status.

== Honours and awards ==
Military Cross
Temporary Lieutenant William George Sellar Curphey, General List and RFC.
For conspicuous skill and gallantry. He brought down an enemy machine, and two days later attacked and brought down another. He has frequently attacked formations of hostile aircraft and driven them down.

Bar to the Military Cross
Temporary Lieutenant (Temporary Captain) William George Sellar Curphey, MC, General List and RFC.
For conspicuous gallantry in action. He, with a patrol of four machines attacked a hostile formation of ten machines. After a prolonged fight he drove one enemy machine down. Later, although wounded, he again led another attack on a hostile machine and succeeded in bringing it down. He has on many previous occasions done fine work.
