= William Henry Hubbard =

Canadian World War I flying ace

- Born: 19 May 1886; Kingston, Ontario, Canada
- Died: 19 June 1960 (aged 74)
- Military career
- Allegiance: George V of the British Empire
- Branch: Royal Flying Corps
- Rank: Captain
- Units: No. 7 Squadron RFC, No. 5 Squadron RFC, No. 73 Squadron RAF
- Awards: Distinguished Flying Cross with Bar

Captain William Henry Hubbard DFC (19 May 1886—19 June 1960) was a Canadian World War I flying ace credited with twelve aerial victories against enemy fighter planes despite spending a year and a half out of action. He was noted for his zeal in ground support missions, as well as his success against enemy fighters.

== Military service ==
Hubbard had moved to Toronto in 1915 when he volunteered for military service. He was commissioned a second lieutenant in the Special Reserve on 1 January 1916. On 9 May 1916, he received Royal Aero Club pilot's certificate no. 2871. On 8 September, while flying a Royal Aircraft Factory BE.2c for No. 5 Squadron RFC, he destroyed a Fokker Eindekker over Saint-Julien. On the day after Christmas, he was severely wounded by Erwin Boehme. Upon recovery, he was posted to Home Establishment as an instructor. He remained there until he was promoted Captain and appointed Flight Commander in No. 73 Squadron RAF, flying a Sopwith Camel. Beginning 11 April 1918, he began to score a steady trickle of wins that took to a total of a dozen on 8 October. It was during this time that he earned both the DFC and a Bar in lieu of a second award; they were awarded more for his ground support missions than aerial success. At any rate, he ended the war with a tally of four German fighter planes destroyed, one set afire in midair, one captured, and six driven down out of control.

== Military honors ==
Distinguished Flying Cross

Capt. William Henry Hubbard,

During recent operations, he has flown at low altitudes to release bombs and to conduct machine-gun fire on troops and transport. He has also engaged enemy aircraft, resulting in some being forced out of control on several occasions.

Bar to Distinguished Flying Cross

Capt. William Henry Hubbard, D.F.C. (FRANCE.)

"This officer has shown great bravery and devotion to duty both in destroying enemy aircraft—ten of which he has accounted for —and in silencing anti-Tank guns. On 27 September, flying at altitudes between 200 and 1,500 feet, he engaged and silenced many anti-Tank guns, thereby rendering valuable service. He at the same time completed a detailed and accurate reconnaissance of the area, locating the position of our troops."

== Aerial victories ==
No.	Date/time	Foe	Result	Location	Notes
1	8 September 1916	Fokker Eindekker	Destroyed	Saint Julien	Observer was Lt. H. B. Rickards
2	11 April 1918 @ 1910 hours	Albatros D.V	Driven down out of control	5 miles southeast of Villers-Brettoneaux	
3	21 May 1918 @ 1830 hours	Albatros D.V	Destroyed	Armentieres	
4	6 June 1918 @ 1710 hours	Fokker D.VII	Driven down out of control	Champien	
5	9 June 1918 @ 1410 hours	Fokker D.VII	Driven down out of control	Conchy	
6	10 June 1918 @ 0705 hours	Fokker D.VII	Driven down out of control	Southwest of Rollot	
7	11 June 1918 @ 1600 hours	Fokker D.VII	Destroyed	3 miles northeast of Rollot	
8	8 July 1918 @ 0720 hours	Fokker D.VII	Set afire and destroyed	Seclin	
9	29 August 1918 @ 1030 hours	Fokker D.VII	Driven down out of control	Northeast of Monchy	
10	29 August 1918 @ 1040 hours	Fokker D.VII	Captured	East of Hendecourt	
11	15 September 1918 @ 1810 hours	Fokker D.VII	Destroyed	Gouy sous Bellone	
12	8 October 1918 @ 0815 hours	Fokker D.VII	Driven down out of control	Maretz	
