= Jagdstaffel 66 =

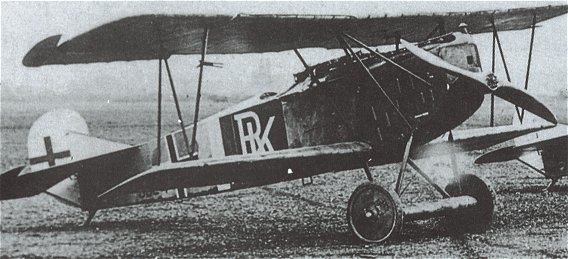
- Fokker D VII of Jagdstaffel 66
- Active: 1918
- Country: Kingdom of Prussia, German Empire
- Branch: Luftstreitkräfte
- Type: Fighter squadron
- Engagements: World War I

Royal Prussian Jagdstaffel 66, commonly abbreviated to Jasta 66, was a "hunting group" (i.e., fighter squadron) of the Luftstreitkräfte, the air arm of the Imperial German Army during World War I. The squadron would score over 97 aerial victories during the war, including seven observation balloons downed. The unit's victories came at the expense of five pilots killed in action, one who died in captivity, and two taken prisoner of war.

== History ==
Jasta 66 was founded on 27 January 1918 at Hannover, Germany, at Fliegerersatz-Abteilung ("Replacement Detachment") 5. The new squadron became operational on 5 February. On 12 February 1918, it was attached to 7 Armee. Rudolf Windisch scored the unit's first victory on 15 March 1918. Jasta 66 would serve 7 Armee until the war's end.

== Commanding officers (Staffelführer) ==
- Rudolf Windisch: 27 January 1918 – 27 May 1918 (KIA)
- Wilhelm Schulz: 27 May 1918 – 25 June 1918 (POW)
- Lambert Schutt: c. 27 May 1918 – 15 July 1918 (KIA)
- Konrad Schwartz: c. 15 July 1918 – 18 July 1918 (DOW)
- Arthur Laumann: c. 18 July 1918 – 11 August 1918
- Kurt-Bertram von Döring: 11 August 1918 – 24 August 1918
- Bruno von Voight: 24 August 1918 – 19 September 1918
- Werner Preuss: 19 September 1918 – war's end

== Duty stations ==
- Saint-Gobert, France: 12 February 1918
- Norman-le-Wast: 5 March 1918
- Perles, France: 20 July 1918
- Sissonne, France: 30 July 1918
- Boncourt, France: 21 August 1918
- Plomion, France: 9 October 1918
- Bourlers: 4 November 1918
- Sarienne-les-Longue
