= Rudolf Windisch =

German World War I flying ace

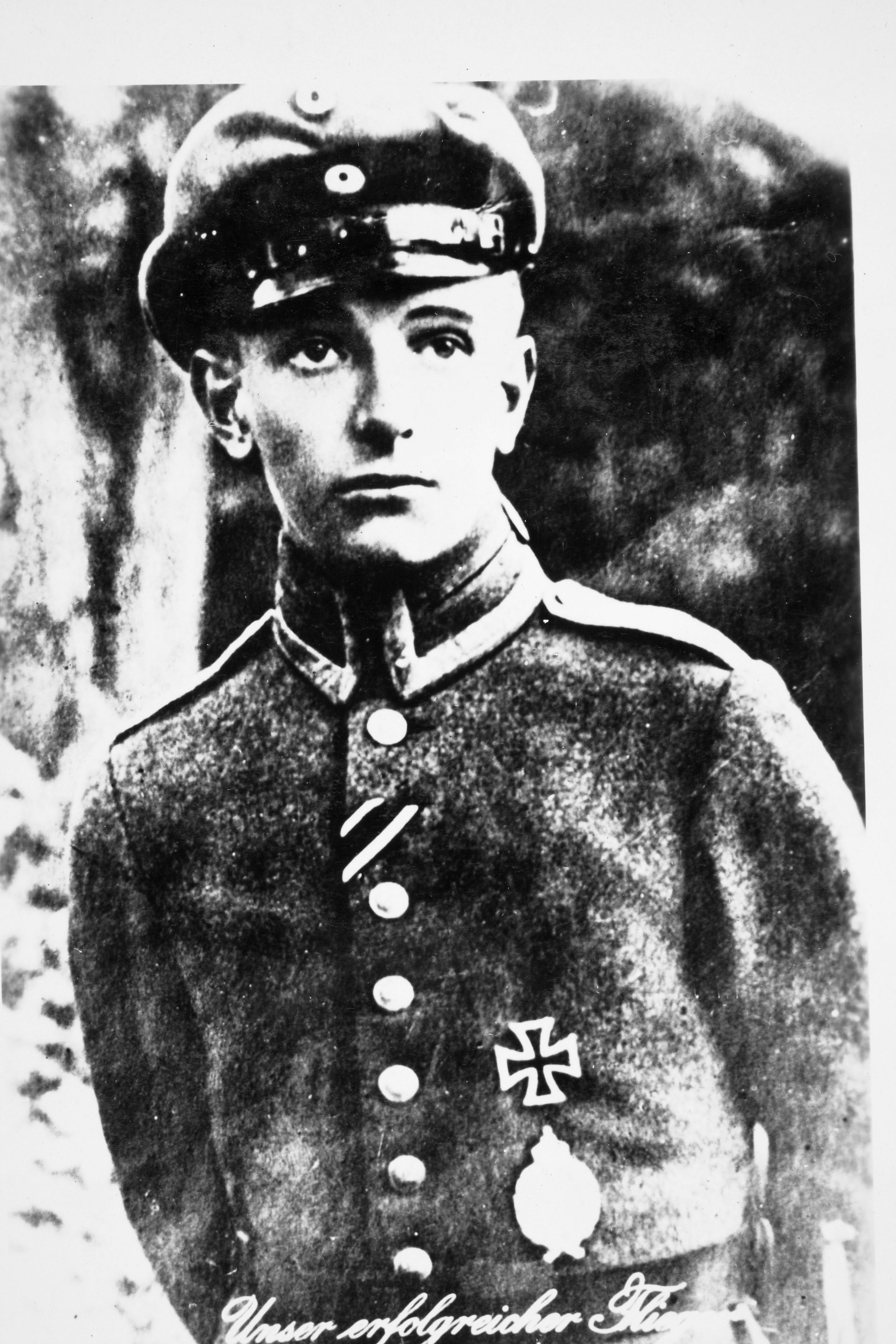
- Rudolph Windisch.
- Born: 27 January 1897; Dresden, Germany
- Died: After 27 May 1918; Missing in action in vicinity of Gouvrelles, France
- Military career
- Allegiance: Germany
- Branch: Infantry, then aerial service
- Service years: 1914–1918?
- Rank: Leutnant
- Units: Infantry Regiment 177, Fliegerersatz-Abteilung: 6, Flieger-Abteilung (Artillerie) 62, Kampfgeschwader der Oberste Heeresleitung II, Jagdstaffel 32, Jagdstaffel 50
- Commands: Jagdstaffel 66
- Awards: Pour le Merite, Royal House Order of Hohenzollern, Iron Cross, Gold Medal of the Military Order of St. Henry, Prussian Order of the Crown (4th Class with Swords)

Leutnant Rudolf Friedrich Otto Windisch (27 January 1897 – after 27 May 1918) was a World War I fighter ace credited with 22 victories.

== Early life and service ==
Rudolf Friedrich Otto Windisch was born in Dresden, Germany, on 27 January 1897, the son of Bruno Windisch, who owned a pastry shop. During his childhood, Rudolf was very interested in aviation. He built model airplanes and then a glider.

On 14 September 1914 at the age of 17, he volunteered for a year's service with Infantry Regiment 177. After a short period of training, he was off to war on the Western Front. On 21 November, he was wounded by shrapnel and removed from front-line duty. He recuperated first at a hospital in Laon, France, then at the Reserve Military Hospital in his hometown of Dresden.

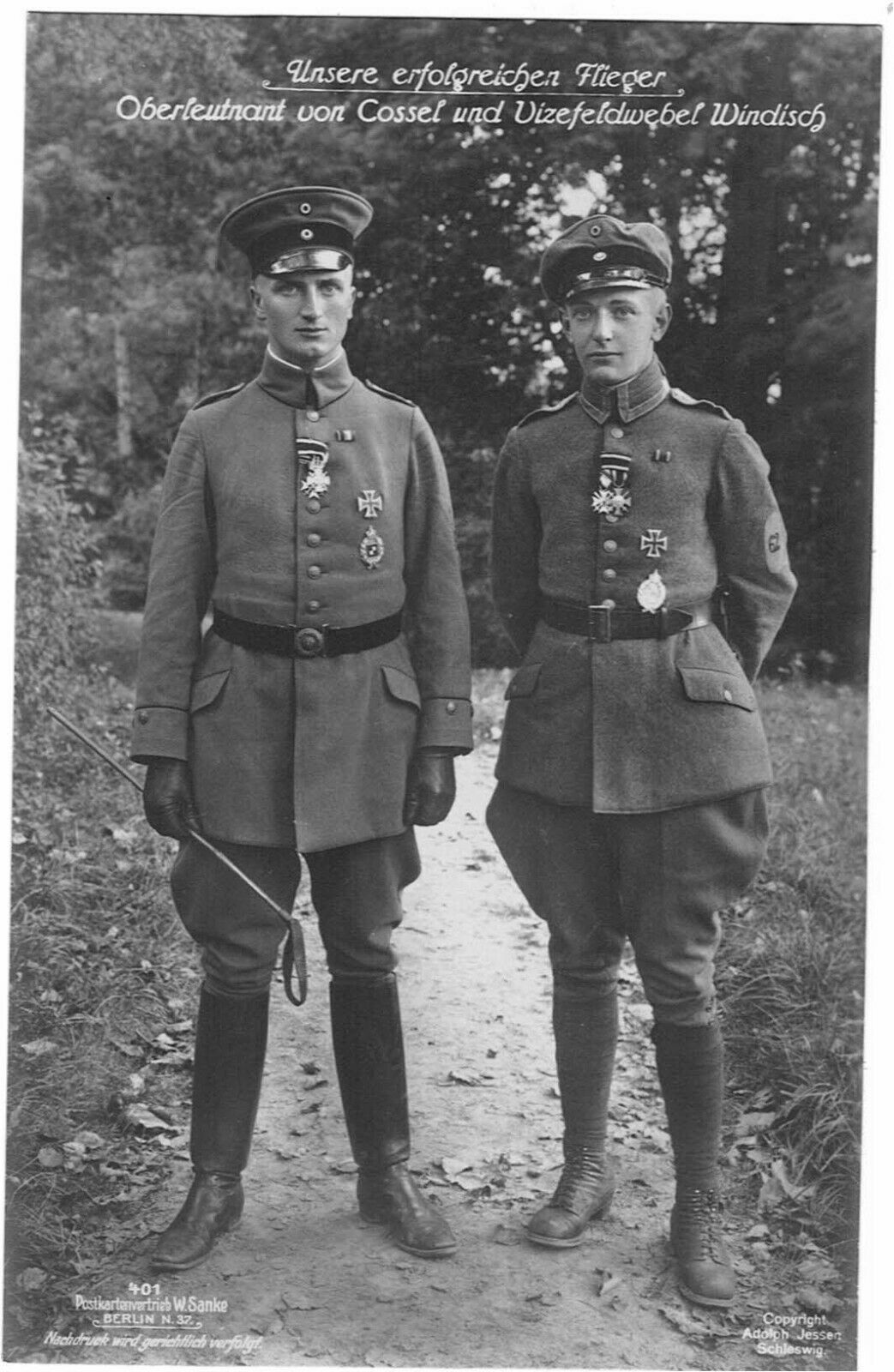
Maximilian von Cossel (left) und Rudolf Windisch (right)

On 22 January 1915, he was transferred to the Luftstreitkräfte. In February 1915, he was assigned to the Military Aviation School in Leipzig-Lindenthal. He was promoted to sergeant and was a flight instructor with FEA 6.

On 1 May 1916, he received a front-line flying assignment with FA 62 on the Russian Front. On the night of 2/3 October 1916, he set out on what is arguably the first case of air-supported sabotage. He landed behind Russian lines and dropped off Oberleutnant Maximilian von Cossel (1893–1967) near the Rowno-to-Brody rail line. Cossel destroyed a railroad bridge that was of strategic importance to the Russians. Windisch swooped in on the 3 May to pick Cossel up and carry him back to safety. This feat earned him the Prussian Order of the Crown (4th Class with Swords); the Kaiser himself presented it on 18 October 1916. Windisch was the only pilot so honored.

In November, he transferred to Kampfgeschwader der Oberste Heeresleitung II to fly reconnaissance missions on the Western Front. On 20 February 1917, he moved up to flying fighters with Royal Bavarian Jasta 32.

== Aerial combat career ==
Even before his feat of espionage derring-do, Windisch had scored his first aerial victory. On 25 August 1916, while still flying a two-seater reconnaissance airplane, he became a balloon buster by shooting down one of the Russian observation balloons southeast of Brody.

His next victory occurred almost a year later, after he transferred to Jasta 32 on the French Front. On 18 September 1917, he shot down an AR2 near Fleury, France. That was the first of his five triumphs during 1917. The last of them, a Spad shot down near Laval, brought his count to six.

He shot down another balloon on 3 January 1918, and another Spad the following day. On 10 January, he was transferred to Royal Prussian Jasta 50 for seasoning before taking command of Royal Prussian Jasta 66 on the 24th.

Sometime during this period, Windisch wangled flying time in a captured Spad VII. Whether he flew it in combat is unknown.

He scored his first win with his new squadron on 15 March 1918. He had six victories in that month, including a triple on 24 March 1918. He scored three more times in April, and five in May, to bring his tally to 22. No fewer than 16 of his wins were over Spad fighters. A Sopwith and an AR2 completed his list of fighter planes. He also destroyed three balloons and a single two-seater reconnaissance plane. As one of the original pilots of Germany's best fighter, the Fokker D.VII, he had a tactical advantage over his foes.

== Disappearance ==
His last victory was on the afternoon of 27 May 1918. Immediately after he shot down this last Spad, he was jumped by several other enemy scouts. A bullet through the gas tank forced him to land behind French lines, about 50 meters from his final victim.

The International Red Cross reported Windisch was a prisoner of war on several occasions. French pilots who fell into German hands reported him in a French prison. On the assumption he was alive, he was awarded the Pour le Merite on 6 June 1918. The reports differed on whether or not he had been injured, with some rumors saying he had died in captivity.

Nothing more ever was heard of Windisch.

== Windisch victories ==
Number	Date/time	Windisch unit	Foe	Result	Location	Notes
1	25 Aug 1916	FA 62	Balloon	Shot down	SE of Brody	
2	18 Sep 1917 1547	Jasta 32	Dorand AR2	Shot down	Fleury	
3	27 Sep 1917 1028	Jasta 32	SPAD	Shot down	Betheville	
4	01 Nov 1917	Jasta 32	SPAD	Shot down	W of Bray	
5	07 Nov 1917	Jasta 32	SPAD	Shot down	Brancourt	
6	18 Nov 1917	Jasta 32	SPAD	Shot down	Laval	Portuguese Pilot Oscar Monteiro Torres of SPA 65; mortally wounded
7	03 Jan 1918	Jasta 32	Balloon	Shot down	Villers	
8	04 Jan 1918	Jasta 32	SPAD	Shot down	S of Staubecken	
9	15 Mar 1918	Jasta 66	SPAD	Shot down	Vitry-Reims	
10	17 Mar 1918	Jasta 66	SPAD	Shot down	Vitry-Reims	
11	23 Mar 1918	Jasta 66	Sopwith 2	Shot down	Le Bruin Ferme	
12	24 Mar 1918	Jasta 66	SPAD 2	Shot down	Bretigny	
13	24 Mar 1918	Jasta 66	SPAD	Shot down	Tergnier	
14	24 Mar 1918	Jasta 66	SPAD	Shot down	Tergnier	
15	11 Apr 1918	Jasta 66	Bréguet 14	Shot down	S of Noyon	
16	21 Apr 1918	Jasta 66	SPAD	Shot down	Guy	
17	21 Apr 1918	Jasta 66	SPAD	Shot down	Guy	
18	3 May 1918	Jasta 66	Balloon	Shot down	Juvigny	
19	4 May 1918	Jasta 66	SPAD	Shot down	Carlepont	
20	15 May 1918	Jasta 66	SPAD 2	Shot down	Trosly-Loire	
21	16 May 1918	Jasta 66	SPAD	Shot down	Thiescourt	
22	27 May 1918	Jasta 66	SPAD 2	Shot down	Couvrelles-Lesges	

== See also ==
- List of people who disappeared
