= Eduard Pulpe =

Latvian flying ace (1880–1916)

Eduard Martynovich Pulpe
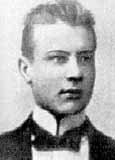
- Born: 22 June 1880; Riga, Latvia
- Died: 2 August 1916 (aged 36); Vicinity of Rogistche
- Military career
- Allegiance: Russian Empire
- Branch: Aéronautique Militaire; Imperial Russian Air Service
- Service years: 1914–1916
- Rank: Lieutenant
- Units: Aéronautique Militaire: Escadrille 23; Imperial Russian Air Service: 10th Aviatsionniy Otryad Istrebitlei (Fighter Aviation Detachment)
- Awards: Russian: Order of St. George; French: Medaille militaire and Croix de Guerre

Lieutenant Eduard Martynovich Pulpe (22 June 1880 – 2 August 1916) was a World War I flying ace credited with five aerial victories. He was a schoolteacher engaged in post-graduate study in France when World War I broke out. As he already held a civil pilot's license, he volunteered to serve in French military aviation. His 1915 aerial victories were among the first ever recorded. After running his score to four, he managed to return home to Russia in May 1916. He was assigned to the 10th Aviatsionniy Otryad Istrebitlei (Fighter Aviation Detachment). After becoming an ace on 1 July 1916, he was killed in action a month later. On 2 August 1916, Eduard Pulpe ultimately lost a nearly hour-long air battle against three enemy aircraft.

== Biography ==
Eduard Martynovich Pulpe was born into a farming family on 22 June 1880, at Riga, Latvia; at that time, Latvia was part of the Russian Empire. Although his earlier education is unknown, he was one of the few that gained entry to college in Russia, attending the University of Moscow. He graduated in 1908, and returned to Riga to become a teacher. Pulpe moved to France in 1912 with the dual aims of furthering his education and learning to fly. After obtaining his civilian pilot's brevet no. 1571 on 19 December 1913, he volunteered for the French air service at the outbreak of war, despite being 34 years old. He furthered his training with the Aéronautique Militaire, being granted military license number 602.

Pulpe was posted to fly a Morane-Saulnier for Escadrille 23 on 1 May 1915. His promotion to Sergent came through on the 21st. The escadrille was stationed in Champagne when he joined it; shortly thereafter, it moved to the Somme. When the squadron left the Somme in August 1915, it bounced around a bit before being assigned to the building Battle of Verdun. Though little information survives, Pulpe's two victories while flying a Morane-Saulnier L over Verdun were among some of the first aerial victories in history. He was awarded both the Croix de Guerre and the Médaille militaire on 29 October 1915. The citation for the latter referred to "air combats", though with no specific mention of his two victories. The Croix de guerre seemed to have been awarded for completing a bombing run while under attack from an enemy fighter. In the meantime, on 20 September, Escadrille 23 began re-equipping with a melange of early Nieuport 10s, Nieuport 11s, and Nieuport 12s.

As ground combat escalated into the Battle of Verdun during February 1916, the corresponding aviation activity became intense. Pulpe, newly promoted to Adjutant, scored a third victory on 20 March 1916. Eleven days later, he brought down another German. In April 1916, he was promoted yet again, to Sous lieutenant. It was during this time that he was dubbed "the pilot with a volcano in his heart".

This was also the month Pulpe transferred home to Russia. On 30 April 1916, the French Aeronautic Mission to Russia gathered in Lyons; Pulpe was included. Once in Murmansk he was assigned to the 10th Aviatsionniy Otryad Istrebitlei (Fighter Aviation Detachment) of the Imperial Russian Air Service in Galicia. Using a Nieuport 11, he shot down an enemy plane on 1 July 1916 to become an ace. On 2 August, Pulpe fell under the guns of Erwin Böhme and his gunner to begin Böhme's victory string. Witnesses on the ground watched Pulpe fight three German fighters for almost an hour before the Russian ace's bullet-riddled aircraft fell spinning to 1,000 feet altitude, recovering briefly, then plunging to earth because its left aileron was ruined. The impact imbedded the aero engine in the earth on the banks of the Styr River near Rogistche. The dying ace, when pulled from the wreckage, could only gasp, "Water". Then he expired from the bullet through the left side of his back.

The Order of St. George Fourth Class was awarded posthumously to Pulpe, as well as a French award of a palm for his previously awarded Croix de guerre. An unmailed letter in Pulpe's effects read: "...I have only one desire—that is the victory over our everlasting enemy. I will die like anyone else. My thoughts will always be about you, my Motherland, Russia and my cradle, Latvia."

One of Pulpe's squadronmates spoke these few words over his grave: "Pulpe was brave, modest as well as courageous, hiding his exploits rather than boasting about them."

== List of aerial victories ==
See also Aerial victory standards of World War I for French victory standards, and List of World War I flying aces from the Russian Empire for list of Russian aces

Confirmed victories are numbered and listed chronologically.

No.	Date/time	Aircraft	Foe	Result	Location	Notes
1	1915	Morane-Saulnier L serial number 1890	German aircraft	Destroyed	Verdun, France	Weaponry used on this occasion was probably a French army carbine
1	1915	Morane-Saulnier L s/n 1890	German aircraft	Destroyed	Verdun, France	Both victories scored in same combat versus 8 enemy aircraft
3	20 March 1916	Nieuport	German aircraft	Destroyed	North of Maucourt, France	Combat against three enemy planes
4	31 March 1916	Nieuport	German aircraft	Destroyed	Consenvoye, France	Combat against three enemy planes
5	1 July 1916	Nieuport 11	Enemy aircraft		Kovel, Russian Empire (present day Ukraine)	

== Citations and references ==
=== Cited sources ===
- Allen Durkota; Thomas Darcey; Victor Kulikov. The Imperial Russian Air Service: Famous Pilots and Aircraft and World War I. Flying Machines Press, 1995. ISBN 0963711024, 9780963711021.
- Norman Franks; Russell Guest; Gregory Alegi. Above the War Fronts: The British Two-seater Bomber Pilot and Observer Aces, the British Two-seater Fighter Observer Aces, and the Belgian, Italian, Austro-Hungarian and Russian Fighter Aces, 1914–1918: Volume 4 of Fighting Airmen of WWI Series: Volume 4 of Air Aces of WWI. Grub Street, 1997. ISBN 1-898697-56-6, ISBN 978-1-898697-56-5.
- Norman Franks. Nieuport Aces of World War I. Osprey Publishing, 2000. ISBN 1-85532-961-1, ISBN 978-1-85532-961-4.
- Norman Franks; Hal Giblin. Under the Guns of the Kaiser's Aces: Bohme, Muller, Von Tutschek and Wolff: The Complete Record of Their Victories and Victims. Grub Street, 2003. ISBN 1-904010-02-4, ISBN 978-1-904010-02-9
