= Juniville =

- Commune
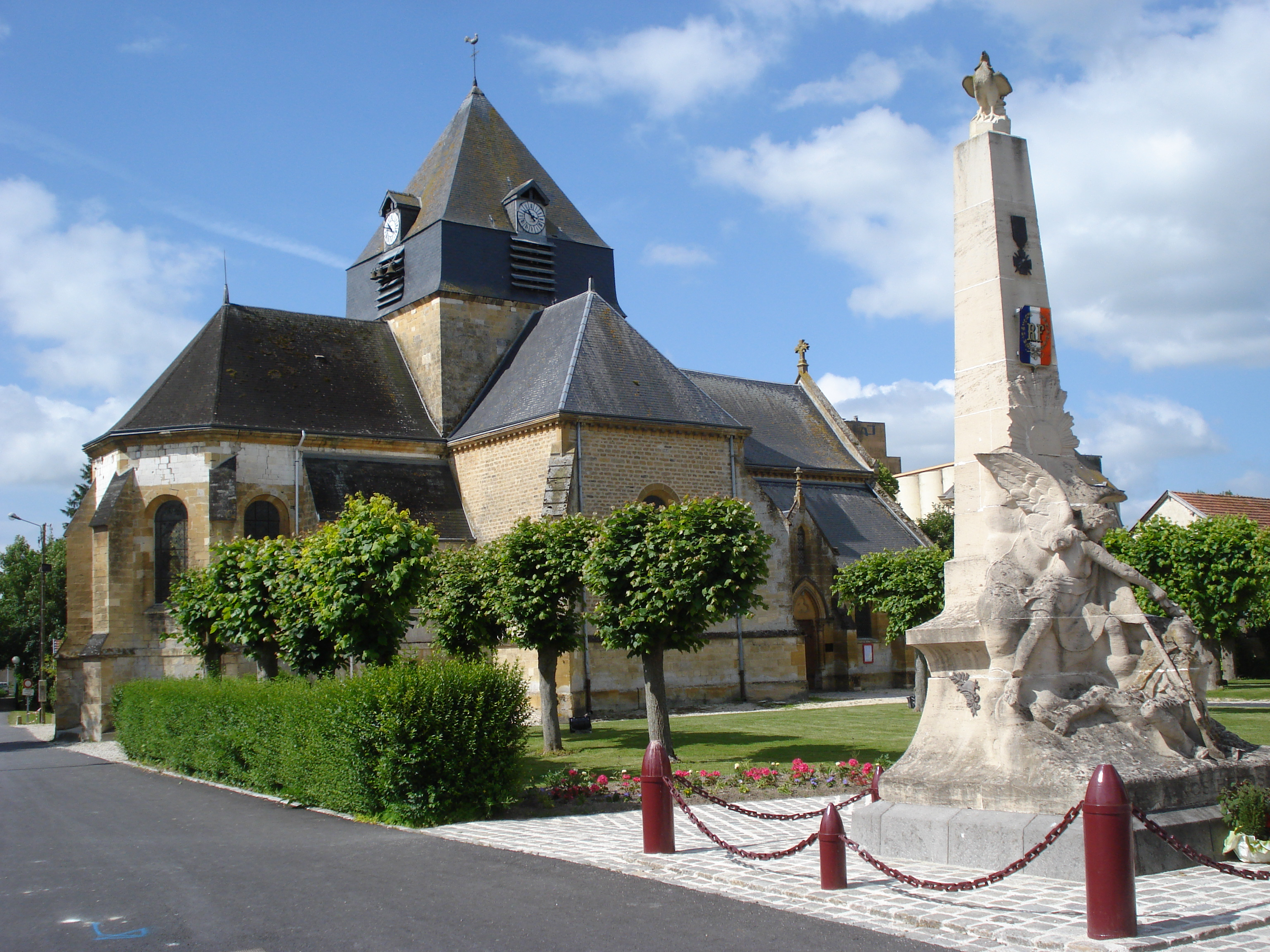
- The church and war memorial in Juniville

- Coat of arms
- Location of Juniville
- Location within France Location within Grand Est
- Coordinates: 49°23′54″N 4°23′00″E
- Country: France
- Region: Grand Est
- Department: Ardennes
- Arrondissement: Rethel
- Canton: Château-Porcien
- Intercommunality: Pays Rethélois

Government
  - Mayor (2020–2026): Christian Cogniard
- Area^{1}: 26.2 km^{2} (10.1 sq mi)
- Elevation: 99 m (325 ft)
- Highest elevation: 147 m (482 ft)
- Lowest elevation: 88 m (289 ft)
- Population (2023): 1,224
  - Density: 46.7/km^{2} (121/sq mi)
- Time zone: UTC+01:00 (CET)
  - Summer (DST): UTC+02:00 (CEST)
- INSEE/Postal code: 08239 /08310
- ^{1} French Land Register data, which excludes lakes, ponds, glaciers > 1 km^{2} (0.386 sq mi or 247 acres) and river estuaries.

Juniville (French pronunciation: [ʒynivil]) is a commune in the Ardennes department and Grand Est region of north-eastern France.

== Population ==
Historical population
Year	Pop.	±% p.a.
1968	718	—
1975	720	+0.04%
1982	760	+0.78%
1990	829	+1.09%
1999	844	+0.20%
2007	1,100	+3.37%
2012	1,205	+1.84%
2017	1,226	+0.35%
2023	1,224	−0.03%
Source: INSEE

== Personalities ==
- The poet Paul Verlaine rented a room in Juniville in the 1880s, close to the farm where his pupil Lucien Létinois lived. The village inn has been restored and turned into a museum dedicated to Verlaine.

== See also ==
- Communes of the Ardennes department
