= Harald Auffarth =

German fighter ace

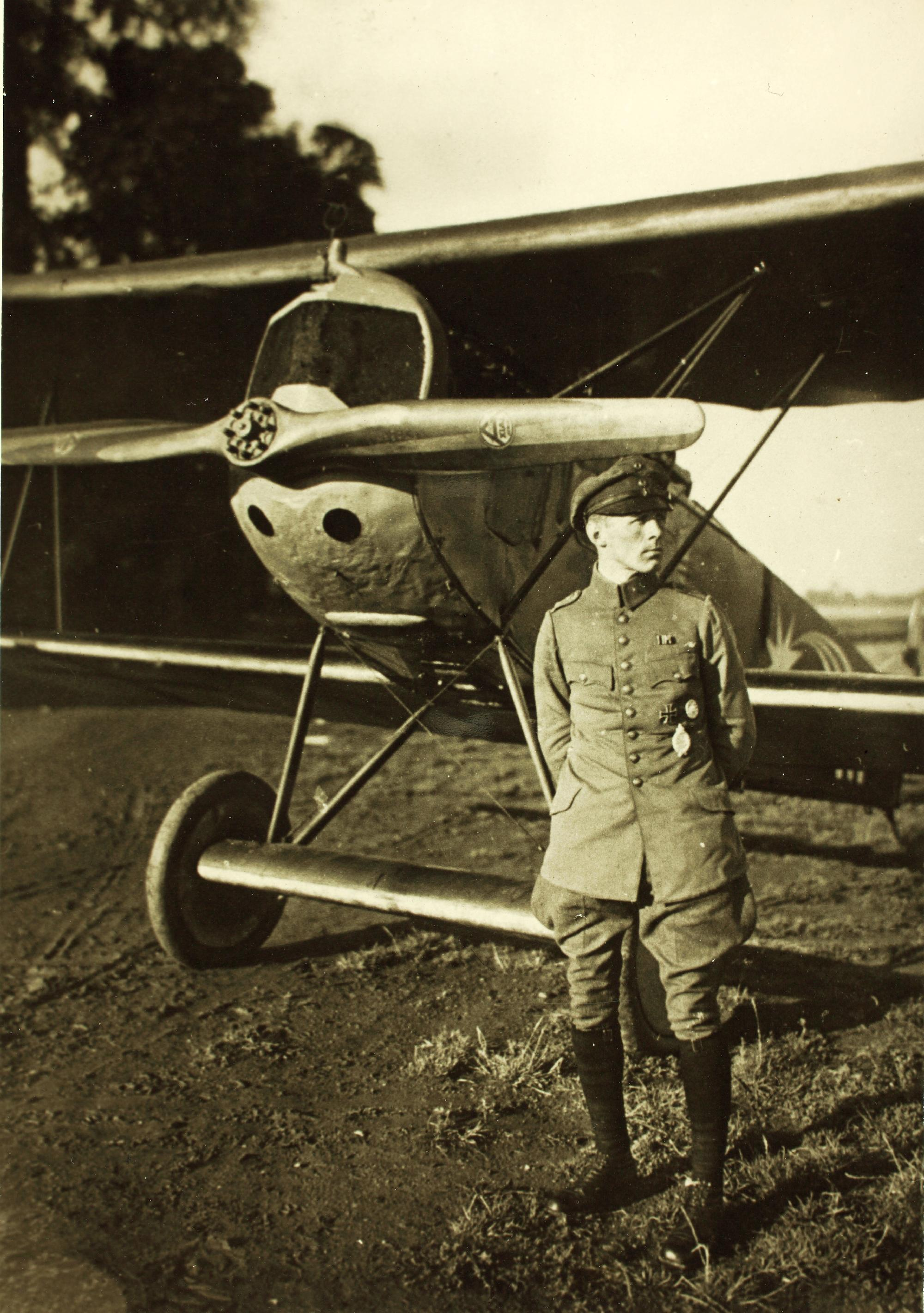
- Note Auffarth's exploding comet insignia just visible above the wing
- Born: c. 1896
- Died: 12 October 1946; Eschenbach, Kingdom of Württemberg
- Military career
- Allegiance: German Empire; Nazi Germany
- Branch: Luftstreitkräfte; Luftwaffe
- Service years: 1914-1918, 1943-1945
- Rank: Oberstleutnant
- Conflicts: World War I; World War II
- Awards: Royal House Order of Hohenzollern; Iron Cross; Hanseatic Cross; Silver Wound Badge
- Other work: Served as Nazi officer during World War II

Eduard Florus Harald Auffarth (also Auffahrt) (c. 1896 – 12 October 1946) Royal House Order of Hohenzollern, Iron Cross, Silver Wound Badge, Hanseatic Cross, was a World War I German fighter ace credited with 29 victories. After the war, he ran an aviation training school that covertly supported establishment of the Luftwaffe.

== Early life ==
Eduard Florus Harald Auffarth's date and place of birth are unknown. However, German youths were generally not accepted for military duty before their 18th birthday. Based on Auffarth's service records, this would seem to indicate a birth date at least prior to 1899, with 1896 or earlier more likely. His later award of a Hanseatic Cross from Bremen would indicate his birth in Bremen, Bremerhaven, or the vicinity; the various kingdoms of the German Empire generally awarded medals only to their subjects. Germany's supreme award, the Prussian Pour le Merite, was an exception to this rule.

== World War I Flying Service ==
A typical career for a German fighter pilot of World War I began with service in a ground unit; wounds and awards for bravery (typically an Iron Cross) could lead to approval of requests for aviation training. After training, the new flier usually served in a reconnaissance unit flying two-seated aircraft. Auffarth served in two of these units. He first served in Feldflieger Abteilung 27. He then transferred to Flieger Abteilung Artillerie 266, which would have entailed the pilot flying while the observer was spotting and correcting artillery fire upon the enemy. Typically, the observer was the senior man in the crew.

Auffarth transferred to flying fighters with Prussian Jagdstaffel 18 and recorded his first victory with them on 16 September 1917. On the last day of the month, he became an ace. He then transferred to Prussian Jagdstaffel 29.

He was appointed Staffelführer (commanding officer) on either 11 or 19 November 1917 (depending on source), as an Oberleutnant and would lead the squadron for almost a year. At any rate, he scored his first victory with them on 13 November and would eventually score a quarter of his new squadron's victories, flying a succession of Albatroses, Fokker D.VIIs, and a rare Pfalz D.VIII, all in his personal colour scheme of yellow nose and green fuselage with a stylized eight-pointed comet on the side.

He accumulated victories erratically until his total stood at 13 as of 27 March 1918. Auffarth received the House Order of Hohenzollern on 11 April 1918. He scored again on 17 May 1918. On 28 May 1918, he was wounded in the hand. The wound would keep him off duty until 21 July 1918. The day after his return, he shot down a Royal Aircraft Factory SE.5a over Loos. When his victory count reached 20 on 3 September 1918, as was customary, he was recommended for the Pour le Merite. It would not be approved before Kaiser Wilhelm II's abdication.

Auffarth was promoted to command of Jagdgruppe Nr. 3 on 28 September 1918. His new fighter wing consisted of Jagdstaffel 14, Jagdstaffel 16, and Jagdstaffel 56, as well as his Jagdstaffel 29. He seemed to fly with the latter, as he continued to credit his victories to Jagdstaffel 29. He then had his finest month as a fighter pilot. He downed an Airco DH.9 piloted by Clayton Knight on 5 October, being downed himself in the process. He scored two victories on 9 October and three each on 14 and 30 October, bringing his total to 29.

== Post World War I ==
He survived the war despite at least three wounds, which was the minimum required to win the Silver Wound Badge. He established Fliegerschule Auffarth (Auffarth's Flying School) in Munster in 1924. This was one of ten flying schools that surreptitiously supported covert military aviation training in Germany in violation of the Treaty of Versailles. The school was closed in 1929, just before Germany began training military pilots deep within Russia.

Auffarth returned to service for World War II. He was stationed in Eschenbach in May 1943 as an Oberstleutnant or lieutenant colonel. He died there on 12 October 1946.
