= 10me Escadrille de Chasse =

The 5me Escadrille de Chasse was the second fighter squadron of the Belgian Air Component. The squadron was founded during World War I, reorganized into a dedicated fighter unit under its new designation of 10me Escadrille de Chasse in March 1918, and became part of a fighter wing before war's end.

== History ==
The 10me Escadrille de Chasse was originally the 5me Escadrille de Chasse, which was founded in August 1916 as the second dedicated squadron of the Aviation Militaire Belge. It drew upon the men and equipment of the previously existing provisional Escadrille V. The new unit used a comet as the unit insignia upon its airplanes. The 5me Escadrille de Chasse mobilized in September 1916. It scored its first victory on 17 November 1916. On 15 February 1917, its patrol of seven would be the first Belgian air formation larger than a pair. The 5me would be credited with 15 aerial victories, at a blood cost of two Belgian pilots KIA and one WIA. In March 1918, it would be reorganized into the 10me Escadrille and become part of Belgium's first fighter wing, the Groupe de Chasse. In this incarnation, the squadron was credited with 11 verified aerial victories out of 22 claims. In turn, it suffered three pilots KIA, two captured, and one WIA.

== Commanding officers ==
1 Capitaine Jules Dony: August 1916 - KIA 1 October 1918

2 Ede Woelmont: 1 October 1918 - 5 October 1918

3 L. Robin: 6 October 1918 - 11 November 1918

== Aerodromes ==
1 La Panne: September 1916 - Summer 1917

2 Les Moeres: Summer 1917 - October 1918

3 Moerkerke: October 1918 - 11 November 1918

== Notable personnel ==
- Edmond Thieffry

== Aircraft ==
- Nieuport 11
- Nieuport 17
- Nieuport 23
- SPAD VII
- Hanriot HD.1
- SPAD XIII:

== Operations ==
At the start of World War I, Belgium was neutral. An overwhelming invasion by the German army left Belgium partially occupied by the end of 1914, with its preserved territory shielded by deliberate defensive flooding at Nieuwpoort by the Belgians. As a result, the Aviation Militaire Belgium was based in the diminished remnant of a small country, and performed largely in a static defensive mode. Only in March 1918, when the unit reformed as the 10me Escadrille, did it become a dedicated fighter squadron capable of being included in combined Allied operations. Only in September 1918 did the Belgian Army advance.
