= Jagdstaffel 24 =

Jasta 24
- Active: 1916–1918
- Country: German Empire
- Branch: Luftstreitkräfte
- Type: Fighter squadron
- Engagements: World War I

Royal Saxon Jagdstaffel 24 was a "hunting group" (i.e., fighter squadron) of the Luftstreitkräfte, the air arm of the Imperial German Army during World War I. As one of the original German fighter squadrons, the unit would score 89 verified aerial victories.

In turn, their casualties for the war would amount to seven pilots killed in action, two killed in crashes, five wounded in action, and one taken prisoner of war.

== History ==
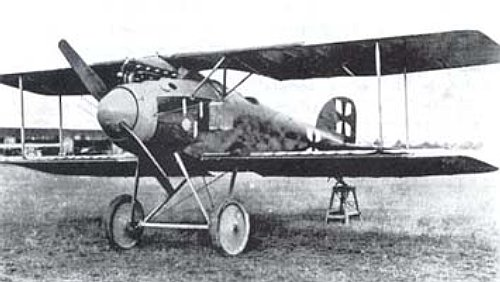
Albatross D.II

Royal Saxon Jagdstaffel 24 had somewhat of a torturous start. It was formed on 25 October 1916 and actually at its initial aerodrome at Mörchingen on 20 November. Aircraft being unavailable for the new unit, five of the Jasta 24 pilots were seconded to Jasta 14, and two more sent to FFA 12 for further training. Albatros D.II fighters for the new squadron arrived during December 1916; January 1917 marked its first combat patrols. First blood for the new Jasta came on 25 February 1917.

Beginning on 26 June 1917, the squadron belonged successively to four different ad hoc Jagdgruppen established to increase combat power. It first belonged to Jagdgruppe 7 under Rudolf Berthold, along with Jasta 18, Jasta 31, and Jasta 36. Jasta 24 then switched to membership in Jagdgruppe 1 at Guise, joining Jasta 8, Jasta 17, and Jasta 48. Jastas 24 and 48 then were placed in Jagdgruppe South under Kurt Küppers. Its final parent organization was Jagdgruppe 12, where it served along with Jasta 44 and Jasta 79.

== Commanding officers (Staffelführer) ==
1. Konstantin von Braun: 1 December 1916 – 29 June 1917
2. Heinrich Kroll: 29 June 1917 – 17 October 1917
3. Rudolf Hepp:17 October 1917 – 6 November 1917
4. Heinrich Kroll: 6 November 1917 – 11 April 1918
5. Rudolf Hepp: 11 April 1918 – 2 May 1918
6. Heinrich Kroll: 2 May 1918 – 14 August 1918 (WIA)
7. Unknown: 14 August 1918 – 21 August 1918
8. Hasso von Wedel: 21 August 1918 – 11 November 1918

== Aerodromes ==
1. Mörchingen: 25 October 1916 – 15 April 1917
2. Annelles, France: 16 April 1917 – 11 June 1917
3. Chassogne Ferme: 12 June 1917 – 26 June 1917
4. Heule, Belgium: 27 June 1917 – 8 September 1917
5. Harlebeke: 8 September 1917 – 22 November 1917
6. Emerchicourt: 23 November 1917 – 27 December 1917
7. Guise: 28 December 1917 – 20 March 1918
8. Pleine-Selve, France: 20 March 1918 – 27 March 1918
9. Villeselve, France: 27 March 1918 – 8 April 1918
10. Ercheu, France: 8 April 1918 – 11 August 1918
11. Guizancourt, France: 11 August 1918 – 15 August 1918
12. Clastres, France: 15 August 1918 – 27 August 1918
13. Chevresis-Monceau, France: 27 August 1918 – 5 September 1918
14. Guise, France: 5 September 1918 – 12 October 1918
15. La Chapelle, France: 12 October 1918 – 20 October 1918
16. Donstiennes, Belgium: 20 October 1918 – 8 November 1918
17. Graux, Belgium: 8 November 1918 – 11 November 1918

== Notable members ==
Heinrich Kroll became an ace during May 1917 before transferring from Jasta 9 to command Jasta 24. He would predominate as both commander and ace, scoring 28 victories for his Jasta, and winning the Pour le Mérite, Royal House Order of Hohenzollern, and Iron Cross.

Not far behind in the victory count was Friedrich Altemeier, with his 21 victories. He won the Military Merit Cross, Iron Cross, and Silver Wound Badge.

Fritz Thiede became an ace with Jasta 24, transferred out to command of Jasta 38, and was awarded an Iron Cross.

Wolfgang Güttler and pre-war pilot Kurt Ungewitter served with Jasta 24; both won Iron Crosses.

Hasso von Wedel also won the Iron Cross while beginning his military aviation career with the squadron. He succeeded to unit command, and later served through World War II.

Alwin Thurm was another ace with the unit.

Austro-Hungarian ace of aces Godwin Brumowski was hosted by the Jasta from 19 to 27 March 1918, and flew patrols with them.

== Aircraft ==
Jasta 24 began operations in 1917 with Pfalz fighters, Albatros D.IIs and Albatros D.IIIs; they also seem to have had at least one Fokker E.V in stock. In May 1917, they tested models of the Siemens-Schuckert D.I but found it inferior to the Albatros.

The Jasta received Fokker D.VII fighters in the Summer of 1918.

== Operations ==
Squadron's location during their protracted formation was the Armee-Abteilung A Sector. Upon movement to Annelles on 16 April 1917, they were stationed on the 1 Armee Front. They moved to support of 5 Armee on 12 June 1917, then two weeks later to support 4 Armee at Heule. They then moved to support 18 Armee for the remainder of the war.
