= Saint Cyprian Tayler =

English World War I flying ace (1896–1918)

Saint Cyprian Churchill Tayler
- Born: 26 February 1896; Winchester, Hampshire, England
- Died: 17 March 1918 (aged 22); South of Cambrai, France †
- Burial place: Arras Flying Services Memorial
- Military career
- Allegiance: United Kingdom
- Branch: British Army
- Service years: 1916–1918
- Rank: Captain
- Units: Royal Sussex Regiment; No. 32 Squadron RFC; No. 80 Squadron RFC
- Conflicts: World War I • Western Front
- Awards: Military Cross

Captain Saint Cyprian Churchill Tayler MC (26 February 1896 – 17 March 1918) was an English World War I flying ace credited with nine aerial victories. He scored those victories while flying for two different squadrons, using three types of aircraft.

== Early life ==
Saint Cyprian Churchill Tayler was born in Winchester, England, on 26 February 1896 to John Frederic Jenner and Minnie Ruth Tayler. By the time of his death his widowed mother was living at "The Haven" on Boshoffs Road, Natal, South Africa.

== World War I ==
Tayler attended the Royal Military College, Sandhurst as a cadet, before being commissioned as a second lieutenant in the Royal Sussex Regiment on 16 August 1916. He was soon seconded to the Royal Flying Corps, and after completing his flying training he was appointed a flying officer on 6 February 1917.

Posted to No. 32 Squadron, he scored his first aerial victory on 14 May 1917 while flying an Airco DH.2 single-seat fighter in Arthur Coningham's flight. His squadron was re-equipped with the Airco DH.5, in which he scored twice more in early July, before he was appointed a flight commander on 13 July 1917, with the acting rank of captain. He shared in three more victories before a report of his being wounded in action on 31 July was published on 16 August 1917.

Tayler's exploits earned him the Military Cross, awarded on 26 September 1917. The award was gazetted on 9 January 1918, his citation reading:

Second Lieutenant St. Cyprian Churchill Tayler, Royal Sussex Regiment and Royal Flying Corps.

"For conspicuous gallantry and devotion to duty in leading offensive patrols against enemy aircraft. On five occasions at least he and his patrol have attacked and brought down hostile machines. These successes were almost entirely due to his very skilful piloting."

In late 1917 Tayler was posted to the newly formed No. 80 Squadron, to fly the Sopwith Camel single-seat fighter. He returned to combat in France with them in January 1918, serving as commander of "C" Flight. He was promoted to lieutenant on 16 February 1918. Tayler gained his last three victories on 10 and 11 March.

On 17 March 1918 he was shot down and killed in combat by Heinrich Kroll of Jasta 24. Originally reported as missing, his death was not officially confirmed until 12 November 1919. Having no known grave he is commemorated at the Arras Flying Services Memorial.

== List of aerial victories ==
Combat record
No.	Date/Time	Aircraft/ Serial No.	Opponent	Result	Location	Notes
No. 32 Squadron RFC
1	14 May 1917 @ 1030	Airco DH.2 (A4800)	Albatros D.III	Destroyed	Southeast of Baralle	
2	11 July 1917 @ 0915	Airco DH.5 (A9385)	Albatros D.III	Driven down out of control	Hooge, Belgium	
3	12 July 1917 @ 0955	Airco DH.5 (A9185)	Albatros D.III	Driven down out of control	Polygon Wood	
4	27 July 1917 @ 1445	Airco DH.5 (A9213)	German reconnaissance aircraft	Destroyed	Gheluvelt	Shared with Lieutenant William Pearson and Second Lieutenants E. Pownall & R. G. Ottey.
5	28 July 1917 @ 0530	Airco DH.5 (A9213)	Albatros reconnaissance aircraft	Destroyed	Pilkem	Shared with Captain R. M. Williams, Lieutenant William Pearson, and Second Lieutenant T. E. Salt.
6	29 July 1917 @ 0800	Airco DH.5 (A9213)	AGO C.II	Captured	Langemarck	Shared with Captain R. M. Williams (A9398), Lieutenant William Pearson, and Second Lieutenant C. Turner.
No. 80 Squadron RFC
7	10 March 1918	Sopwith Camel	Albatros D.V	Destroyed	Bohain-en-Vermandois—Ribemont	
8	10 March 1918	Sopwith Camel	Albatros D.V	Driven down out of control	Bohain-en-Vermandois—Ribemont	
9	13 March 1918	Sopwith Camel	Albatros D.V	Destroyed		

== Bibliography ==
- Shores, Christopher F.; Franks, Norman & Guest, Russell F. (1990). Above the Trenches: a Complete Record of the Fighter Aces and Units of the British Empire Air Forces 1915–1920. London, UK: Grub Street. ISBN 978-0-948817-19-9.
