= Hasso von Wedel =

Hasso von Wedel may refer to:

- Hasso von Wedel (general) (1898–1961), commander of the Wehrmacht Propaganda Troops during World War II
- Hasso von Wedel (aviator) (1893–1945), German World War I flying ace and World War II pilot
