= Jagdstaffel 44 =

Jasta 44
- Active: 1917–1918
- Country: German Empire
- Branch: Luftstreitkräfte
- Type: Fighter squadron
- Engagements: World War I

Royal Saxon Jagdstaffel 44, commonly abbreviated to Jasta 44, was a "hunting group" (i.e., fighter squadron) of the Luftstreitkräfte, the air arm of the Imperial German Army during World War I. The unit would score 19 aerial victories during the war, including four observation balloons downed. The squadron's victories came at the expense of two killed in action, two killed in flying accidents, two wounded in action, one injured in an accident, and two taken prisoner of war.

== History ==
Jasta 44 was formed on 11 December 1917 at Flieger-Abteilung ("Flier Detachment") 6 at Grossenhain. It went operational on 23 December 1917. In April 1918, it joined Jagdgruppe 12, commanded by Heinrich Kroll. The squadron served until it was disbanded on 1 December 1918.

== Commanding officers (Staffelführer) ==
- Max Raspe: 11 December 1917
- Albert Freytag: 14 February 1918
- Paul Lotz: 10 June 1918 – 23 October 1918 (KIA)
- Leutnant von Borries: 23 October 1918

== Duty stations ==
- Leffincourt, France
- Villeselve, France: March 1918
- Ercheu: Early April 1918
- Donstiennes, Belgium: 19 October 1918

== Operations ==
Jasta 44's first operational assignment, at Leffincourt, was support of 3 Armee. After being incorporated into Jagdgruppe 12, it usually supported 18 Armee. The squadron would serve through war's end, being disbanded at Kamenz, Kingdom of Saxony, on 1 December 1918.

== Aircraft ==
Jasta 44 re-equipped with Fokker D.VII fighters when it was consolidated into Jagdgruppe 12. Its previous equipment is unknown.
