= Fritz Thiede =

German flying ace

- Born: 21 January 1896; Lichterfelde, German Empire
- Died: 14 June 1981 (aged 85); Lüneburg, Germany
- Military career
- Allegiance: Germany
- Branch: Aviation (Luftstreitkräfte; Luftwaffe)
- Rank: Leutnant
- Unit: Schutzstaffel (Protection Squadron) 5, Jagdstaffel 24
- Commands: Jagdstaffel 38
- Awards: Iron Cross; letter of appreciation from Kaiser Wilhelm II
- Other work: Personal pilot for Heinrich Himmler and Reinhard Heydrich in 1930s

Leutnant Fritz Thiede (21 January 1896 – 14 June 1981) was a World War I flying ace credited with eight aerial victories. He became a personal pilot for Heinrich Himmler and Reinhard Heydrich in the 1930s. He served in the Luftwaffe during World War II.

== Biography ==
Fritz Thiede was born in Lichterfelde, the German Empire on 21 January 1896. He joined the 2nd Fusilier Artillery Regiment on 1 October 1913. He was still serving with them when World War I began.

On 1 May 1915, he transferred to the Luftstreitkräfte to start aviation training at Fliegerersatz-Abteilung (Replacement Detachment) 5 in Hannover, Germany. Once trained, Thiede was posted to Schutzstaffel (Protection Squadron) 5 in February 1916. This squadron was attached to "Bombengeschwader der Oberste Heeresleitung" 2; Bogohl 2 was directly subordinate to the German Supreme Command. Schutzstaffel 5 was a defensive fighter squadron. Thiede saw action over the Battle of the Somme.

Fritz Thiede was commissioned as a Leutnant in October 1917. He went to Jastaschule (Fighter School) to upgrade to single-seat fighters. On 21 January 1918, he was sent to a single-seat fighter squadron, Jagdstaffel 24.

Thiede staked his first victory claim on 16 March 1918, but it went unconfirmed. On 22 March, he was brought down by anti-aircraft fire west of Le Fere, but was unscathed. On 21 April, he finally scored his first accredited victory, when he downed a SPAD over Tricot. Thiede received a personal letter of appreciation from Kaiser Wilhelm II for a double victory on the night of 23 May 1918. He would continue to score throughout May and June, becoming an ace on 15 June 1918.

On 23 June 1918, Thiede was reassigned, when he was given command of Jagdstaffel 38 in Macedonia. He scored three victories with them during September 1918, bringing his tally to eight confirmed wins. At some point during the war, he had won the Iron Cross First Class; this award presupposes prior award of the Second Class medal.

First Thiede would go on to become the private pilot for Reinhard Heydrich and Heinrich Himmler. In 1938, Thiede recommended a "below the tail" approach tactics for night fighters attacking enemy bombers, but it was rejected, only to be revived during the Second World War. Thiede served in the Luftwaffe during World War II.
