= Friedrich Altemeier =

- Born: 4 June 1886; Niederbecksen (today Bad Oeynhausen)
- Died: 18 September 1968 (aged 82)
- Military career
- Allegiance: Germany
- Branch: Infantry, aviation
- Service years: 1914–1918
- Rank: Offizierstellvertreter
- Units: Flieger-Abteilung 67 (Flier Detachment 67); Jagdstaffel 14 (Fighter Squadron 14); Jagdstaffel 24 (Fighter Squadron 24)
- Awards: Military Merit Cross; Friedrich August Medal; Iron Cross; Silver Wound Badge

Friedrich Altemeier (4 June 1886 – 18 September 1968) was a German World War I flying ace credited with 21 confirmed aerial victories. Due to his distinguished faithful military service and piloting skills, he became one of the test pilots for Germany's last and best fighter airplane of the war, the Fokker D.VIII.

== Early life ==
Friedrich Altemeier was born in Niederbecksen on 4 June 1886. He went to military school from 1906 until 1908. He worked for Krupp before World War I began.

== Early military service ==
He was called up for military duty on 2 August 1914. Altemeier originally served in the infantry in a machine gun company. He was wounded in action on 15 January 1915.

On 11 August 1915, he transferred to aerial service. After training at Posen, he served first with a two-seater unit, Flieger-Abteilung 67, beginning 21 July 1916. In September, Altemeier transferred to Royal Prussian Jagdstaffel 14 to fly single-seat fighters. He was not long with this squadron, as he was then transferred to Royal Saxon Jagdstaffel 24 on the Western Front on 1 December 1916.

== Aerial victories ==
Altermeier was promoted to Offizierstellvertreter soon after joining his new squadron. He opened his score with his new squadron on 3 March 1917. He used twin-gunned Albatros D.III fighters, often emblazoned with the triple rings of the Krupp Works, to down a Nieuport 17. On 30 May 1917, he received the Iron Cross, First Class.

Four months later, he began to score again, downing a RNAS Sopwith Triplane on 7 July and a Spad VII five days later. Then, on 17 August, he shot a Spad S.VII and an RE.8 to become an ace. He triumphed four more times in September, with his last in this string coming on the 26th. He was then wounded, and did not score again that year.

On 19 February 1918, he shot down a RAF SE.5a to again begin his winning ways. This was his tenth victory. He tallied another win in February, followed by three in March.

Altemeier's native Bavaria awarded him the Silver Friedrich August Medal on 4 March 1918. Then he was awarded the enlisted man's equivalent to the Blue Max, the Military Merit Cross, on 11 April 1918. Altemeier was wounded for the third time on 25 July 1918, qualifying him for the Silver Wound Badge.

Altemeier went on hiatus until August, when he scored twice. He had two confirmed victories and one unconfirmed in both September and October 1918. His final victim, on 10 November, the day before the armistice, was his 21st victory and the squadron's 91st and final one. Altemeier and his Staffelfuehrer (Commander), Heinrich Kroll, had accounted for half the wins scored by their squadron.

Altemeier was one of the few pilots entrusted with the most modern German fighter of World War I, the Fokker E.V (sometimes called the Fokker D.VIII).

== Post World War I ==
Friedrich Altemeier survived World War I. He died on 18 September 1968.
