= Kurt Ungewitter =

- Born: 13 November 1891; Elberfeld, German Empire
- Died: 14 March 1927 (aged 35)
- Military career
- Allegiance: Germany
- Branch: Aviation (Luftstreitkräfte)
- Service years: 1913 - ca 1918
- Rank: Vizefeldwebel
- Units: Schutzstaffel 5 (Protection Squadron 5), Jagdstaffel 24 (Fighter Squadron 24)
- Awards: Iron Cross (both classes)

Vizefeldwebel Kurt Ungewitter was a German test pilot for Rumpler Flugzeugwerke and Albatros Flugzeugwerke, aircraft manufacturers in 1913. During World War I, he became a flying ace credited with seven aerial victories. He died in a postwar flying accident on 14 March 1927.

== Biography ==
Kurt Ungewitter was born in Elberfeld on 13 November 1891. He had an early interest in aviation; he learned to fly in 1913 and became a test pilot for two German aircraft companies, Albatros and Rumpler until the start of the First World War. On 27 February 1914, just before the First World War began, he qualified for pilot certificate No. 683.

His assignments and actions in the early days of the war are unknown; however, he was still a Gefreiter when assigned to Schutzstaffel 5 (Protection squadron 5) in 1917.

On 3 January 1918, Ungewitter flew a DFW C.V that attacked a British aerial photography mission flown by Keith Park and his observer. The latter, Lieutenant John Henry Robertson, fired a burst of machine gun fire into the German two-seater, which dropped away in a sharp dive. The British air crew submitted a combat report claiming a "driven down out of control" victory. It was confirmed. Ungewitter also submitted a combat report claiming victory over Park and Robertson. It was denied.

However, flying with Vizefeldwebel Meinke as the aerial observer manning the guns in the rear seat, Ungewitter and Meinke scored two confirmed aerial victories in early 1918, on 9 January and 18 February. Ungewitter was awarded both the Second Class and First Class Iron Cross.

He was subsequently promoted, first to Unteroffizier, then to Vizefeldwebel. Though there is no mention of Ungewitter receiving the usual advanced training at Jastaschule (Fighter School), on 6 June 1918 he left Flug Park 18 (Flight Park 18) on a posting to a fighter squadron, Jagdstaffel 24. At 1940 hours on 27 June, he scored his first single-seater victory when he destroyed an observation balloon over Saint Just.

Ungewitter would not score again until 23 September 1918, when he downed a Bristol F.2b Fighter at 1725 hours over Levergies. He would destroy a Royal Aircraft Factory SE.5 on morning sorties on both 3 and 8 October. A final victory over Sopwith Dolphin number C8165 from No. 87 Squadron RAF on 4 November 1918, just one week before the war ended, brought his total to seven victories.

Kurt Ungewitter was killed in a flying accident on 14 March 1927.
