= Jagdstaffel 48 =

Jasta 48
- Active: 1916–1918
- Country: German Empire
- Branch: Luftstreitkräfte
- Type: Fighter squadron
- Engagements: World War I

Royal Prussian Jagdstaffel 48, commonly abbreviated to Jasta 48, was a "hunting group" (i.e., fighter squadron) of the Luftstreitkräfte, the air arm of the Imperial German Army during World War I. The squadron would score six aerial victories by the end of August 1918; records past that date are missing. The unit's victories came at the expense of five pilots killed in action, two killed in flying accidents, one wounded in action, and one taken prisoner of war.

== History ==
At least one source insists there are no surviving records of Jasta 48. However, it is known that Jasta 48 began at Flieger-Abteilung (Flier Detachment) 11 at Brzeg, Kingdom of Prussia, on 16 December 1916. On 5 January 1917, the new squadron moved to support 18 Armee. The Jasta flew its first combat missions on 12 January 1917. Its original commander scored its first known aerial victory on 6 March 1918. On 19 May 1918, it was relocated to join Jagdgruppe 11 in support of 3 Armee. Jasta 48 would serve through war's end.

== Commanding officers (Staffelführer) ==
- Kurt Küppers: 16 December 1916
- Walter Stock: August 1918

== Duty stations ==
- Guise, France: 5 January 1917
- Mont-d'Origny, France
- Villeselve, France
- Moyencourt, France
- Vivaise, France
- Chuffilly-Roche, France
- Malmy-Chéméry, France
- Autrecourt, France
