= Wolfgang Güttler =

World War I flying ace

- Born: 22 February 1893; Reichenstein
- Died: 20 February 1918 (aged 24); Reneuil Ferme
- Military career
- Allegiance: German Empire
- Branch: Aviation
- Rank: Leutnant
- Units: Flieger-Abteilung (Flier Detachment) 72; Flieger-Abteilung (Flier Detachment) 285; Jagdstaffel 24 (Fighter Squadron 24); Jagdstaffel 13 (Fighter Squadron 13)
- Commands: Jagdstaffel 13
- Awards: Iron Cross (both classes)

Leutnant Wolfgang Güttler was a World War I flying ace credited with eight aerial victories. He would score the first four while flying with Jagdstaffel 24, and the last four while flying as commander of Jagdstaffel 13. He was killed in a midair collision over his home airfield on 20 February 1918.

== Biography ==
Wolfgang Güttler was born in Reichenstein on 22 February 1893. At the start of World War I, he served with the Jäger-Bataillon Nr. 11 (11th Jaeger Bataillon), and won a Second Class Iron Cross. He then transferred to the Die Fliegertruppen (Imperial German Air Service).

After training as a pilot, Güttler was posted to Feldfliegerabteilung (Field Flier Detachment) 72 on the Eastern Front in 1916. He later served with Fliegerabteilung (Artillerie)|Feldflieger Abteilung (Field Flier Detachment) 285. During this time, he was awarded the First Class Iron Cross in November 1916.

He then underwent single-seater fighter training at Fliegerersatz-Abteilung (Replacement Detachment) 11. He was then posted to a fighter squadron, Jagdstaffel 24, on 10 March 1917. He scored his first aerial victory on 2 May 1917, when he shot down a Nieuport 17 south of Bienes. By 9 August, he had shot down a Spad VII and two Sopwith Triplanes of 10 Naval Squadron RNAS.

On 29 September 1917, he was posted to Jagdstaffel 13 to command it as its Staffelführer (C.O.). He scored his fifth victory on 20 October 1917; on 19 February he scored his eighth. The following day, Wolfgang Güttler was engaged in aerial combat over Jagdstaffel 13's home aerodrome at Reneuil Ferme when he collided with another German pilot and was killed in action.
