= Jagdstaffel 75 =

Jasta 75
- Active: 1918
- Country: Kingdom of Prussia, German Empire
- Branch: Luftstreitkräfte
- Type: Fighter squadron
- Engagements: World War I

Royal Prussian Jagdstaffel 75, commonly abbreviated to Jasta 75, was a "hunting group" (i.e., fighter squadron) of the Luftstreitkräfte, the air arm of the Imperial German Army during World War I. The squadron would score four aerial victories during the war, including an observation balloon downed. The unit's victories came at the expense of one wounded in action.

== History ==
Jasta 75 was founded on 16 February 1918 at Fliegerersatz-Abteilung ("Replacement Detachment") 2, Schneidemuhl. The new squadron became operational on 25 February. On 1 March 1918, it was posted to Armee-Abteilung B. The unit made its first victory claim on 12 April 1918.

== Commanding officers (Staffelführer) ==
- Hasso von Wedel: c. 16 February 1918 – 28 June 1918 (WIA)
- Lothar Haussler: 28 June 1918 – 1 August 1918
- Hasso von Wedel: 1 August 1918 – 21 August 1918
- Walter Karjus: 21 August 1918 – war's end

== Duty stations ==
- Habsheim, France: 1 March 1918 - war's end
