= Hasso von Wedel (aviator) =

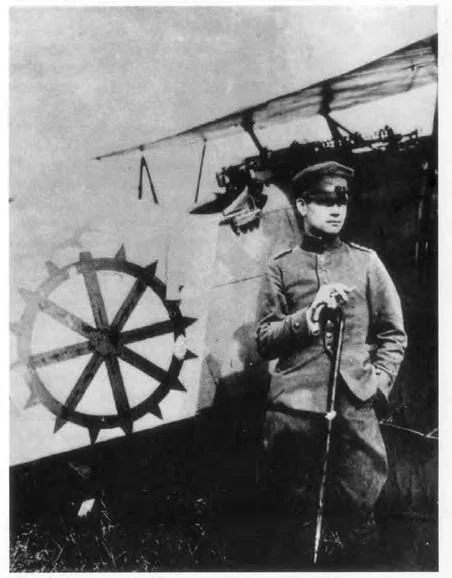
- Hasso von Wedel with his Fokker D.VII, taken in 1918
- Born: 12 May 1893; Rannamõisa (Vogelsang), Martna Parish, Wiek County, Governorate of Estonia
- Died: 1945 (aged 51–52); Berlin, Nazi Germany
- Military career
- Allegiance: Germany
- Branch: Aviation
- Service years: 1916–1918, 1939–1945
- Rank: Oberleutnant
- Units: FA 39, FA 59, FA 206, FAA 53, FFA 17, JG 12, Jasta 14, Jasta 75, Jasta 24 {world War I
- Awards: Iron Cross

Oberleutnant Bernhard Rudolf Hasso von Wedel (12 May 1893–1945) IC began his career as a World War I flying ace credited with five aerial victories. He served as a fighter pilot during World War II; in the Battle of Britain, after a spell as a prisoner of war, he was repatriated and fought in the Battle of Berlin.

== Prewar life ==
Hasso von Wedel was born in Vogelsang on 12 May 1893. On 22 March 1912, he enlisted as a cadet in the 11th Dragoon Regiment.

== World War I service ==
Once the war began, Wedel transferred to aviation duty. He trained as an aerial observer in November 1915. Once trained, he served in reconnaissance aircraft until May 1917 in a series of artillery spotting squadrons. During this spell, on 22 September 1916, he was credited with downing an enemy aircraft.

For a short spell in February 1918, Wedel joined a fighter squadron, Jagdstaffel 14. On 21 February, he was transferred to command Jagdstaffel 75. On 16 May 1918, he shot down an observation balloon for his second victory. He was wounded in action on 28 June.

On 21 August, Wedel was appointed to two posts. He would command Jagdgruppe 12 while also leading one of its squadrons, Jagdstaffel 24. During September, Wedel would shoot down three enemy aircraft, two of which were SE-5a fighters. By war's end, Wedel would have won both classes of the iron Cross.

== World War II service ==
Wedel flew a Messerschmitt Bf 109 into the Battle of Britain. At 12:15 hours on 15 September 1940, he was shot down near Bilsington. He survived the crash and was repatriated. He died in the final defense of Berlin in 1945, where he was participating in street-to-street fighting.
