= Kurt Küppers =

German flying ace

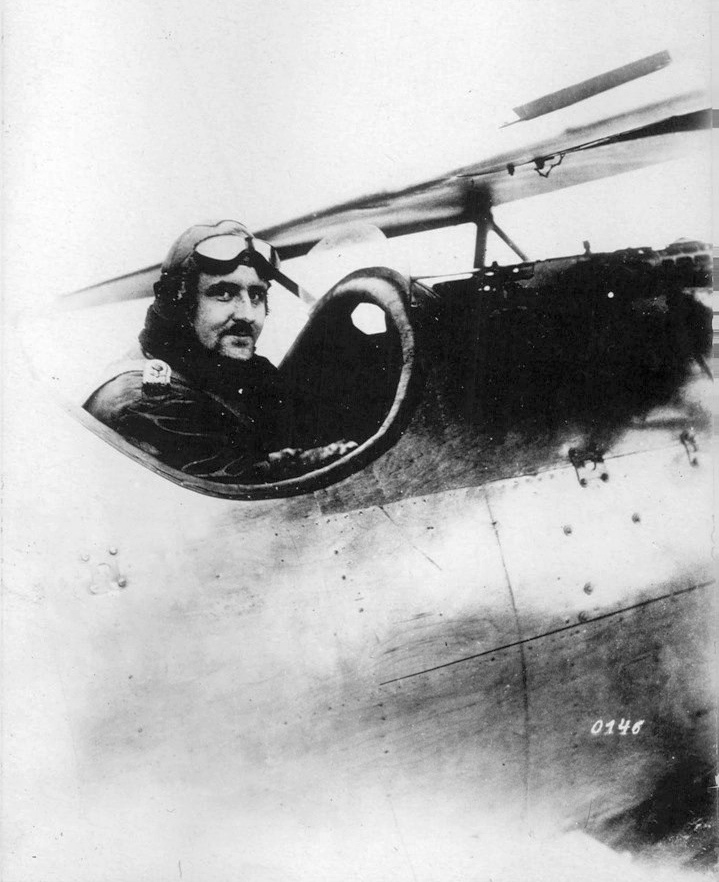
- Born: 1894
- Died: 24 June 1971 (aged 76–77)
- Military career
- Allegiance: Germany
- Branch: Aviation
- Rank: Leutnant
- Units: Flieger-Abteilung 45, Jagdstaffel 6, Kampfstaffel 14
- Commands: Jagdstaffel 48
- Awards: Iron Cross First Class (which presupposes prior award of the Second Class)

Leutnant Kurt Küppers was a World War I flying ace credited with six aerial victories.

== Biography ==
=== Early life ===
Kurt Küppers was born in 1894, birthplace unknown. An early interest in aviation led him to gain pilot's license No. 492, granted on 22 August 1913.

=== Service in military aviation ===
Küppers was serving in the Luftstreitkräfte when World War I began. However, his first known assignment was as a pilot of two-seater reconnaissance aircraft in the vicinity of Dunkirk in 1916. After that, he served on the Eastern Front with Flieger-Abteilung (Flier Detachment) 45, a recon unit. Although it goes unmentioned in records, he must have undergone fighter pilot's training, because his next posting was to a fighter squadron, Jagdstaffel 6 (Jasta 6), in March 1917. Between 16 March and 12 July 1917, he scored four aerial victories.

However, in August 1917, Küppers transferred to Kampfstaffel (Tactical Bomber Squadron) 14 as a bomber pilot; there he flew a Gotha bomber to convey his friend Fritz Lorenz on several raids on England. Küppers returned to Jasta 6 in October. He scored his fifth credited aerial victory on 23 November 1917.

On 16 December 1917, he was tasked to form and command a new fighter squadron, Jagdstaffel 48 (Jasta 48). On 6 March 1918, he scored his sixth and final victory. He remained in command of Jasta 48 until he was relieved from combat on 23 August 1918.

=== Later life ===
Having won the Iron Cross First Class, (Note: German regulations mandated award of the Second Class before the First Class Iron Cross.) Kurt Küppers survived World War I to slip into obscurity. He is known to have died on 24 June 1971.
