= Caillouël-Crépigny =

- Commune
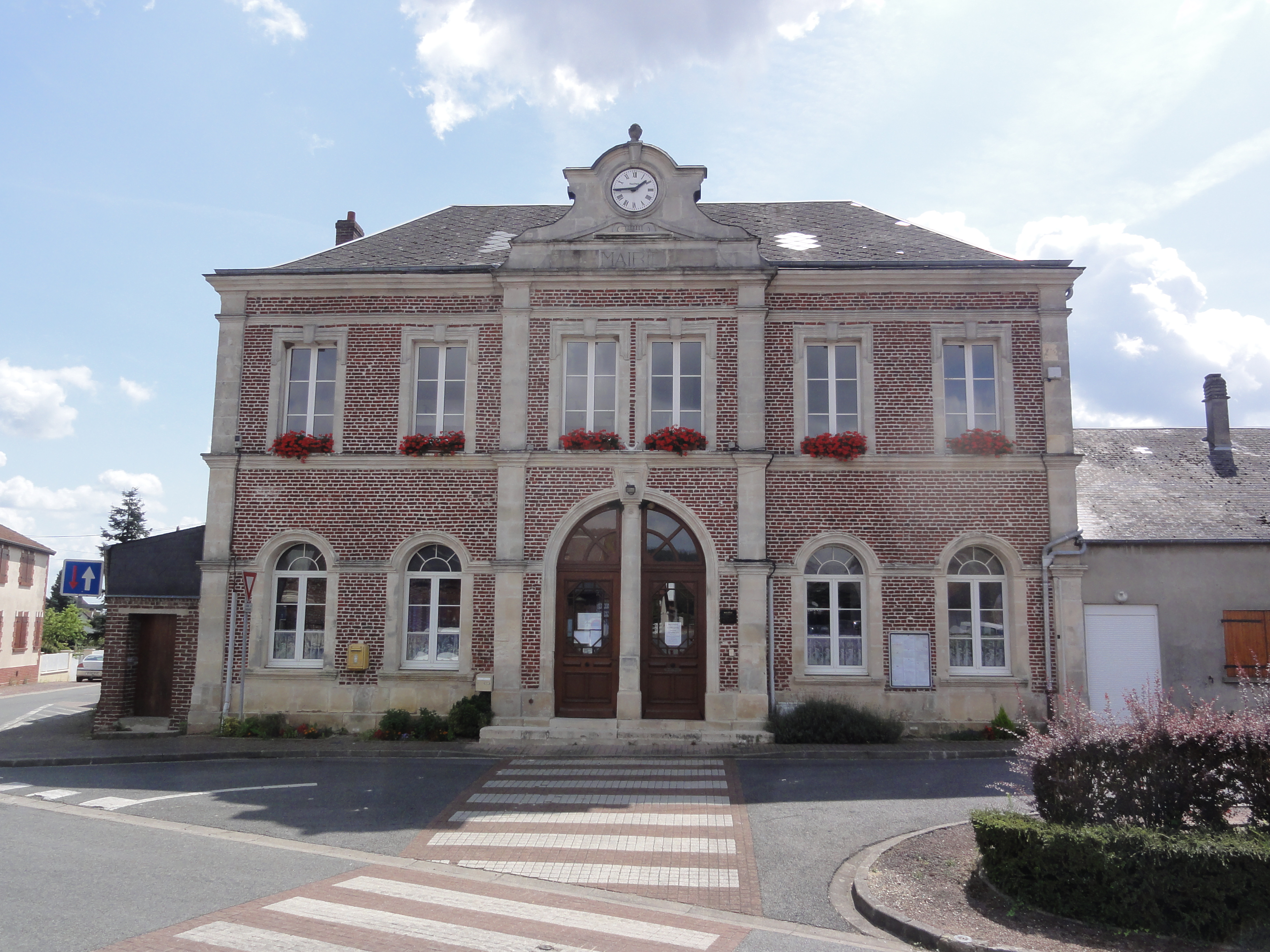
- The town hall of Caillouël-Crépigny
- Location of Caillouël-Crépigny
- Location within France Location within Hauts-de-France
- Coordinates: 49°37′20″N 3°07′43″E
- Country: France
- Region: Hauts-de-France
- Department: Aisne
- Arrondissement: Laon
- Canton: Chauny
- Intercommunality: CA Chauny Tergnier La Fère

Government
  - Mayor (2026–32): Alain Albaric
- Area^{1}: 6.63 km^{2} (2.56 sq mi)
- Elevation: 182 m (597 ft)
- Highest elevation: 182 m (597 ft)
- Lowest elevation: 53 m (174 ft)
- Population (2023): 459
  - Density: 69.2/km^{2} (179/sq mi)
- Time zone: UTC+01:00 (CET)
  - Summer (DST): UTC+02:00 (CEST)
- INSEE/Postal code: 02139 /02300
- ^{1} French Land Register data, which excludes lakes, ponds, glaciers > 1 km^{2} (0.386 sq mi or 247 acres) and river estuaries.

Caillouël-Crépigny is a commune in the Aisne department in Hauts-de-France in northern France.

== Population ==
Historical population
Year	Pop.	±% p.a.
1968	273	—
1975	258	−0.80%
1982	379	+5.65%
1990	457	+2.37%
1999	426	−0.78%
2007	409	−0.51%
2012	427	+0.87%
2017	438	+0.51%
2023	459	+0.78%
Source: INSEE

== See also ==
- Communes of the Aisne department
