= Jagdstaffel 38 =

German Military unit during WW I

Jasta 38
- Active: 1917–1918
- Country: German Empire
- Branch: Luftstreitkräfte
- Type: Fighter squadron
- Engagements: World War I

Royal Prussian Jagdstaffel 38, commonly abbreviated to Jasta 38, was a "hunting group" (i.e., fighter squadron) of the Luftstreitkräfte, the air arm of the Imperial German Army during World War I. The unit would score 17 aerial victories during the war. The squadron's victories came at the expense of four losses, including one killed in action, one injured in a flying accident, and one wounded in action.

== History ==
Jasta 38 was founded at Hudova, Macedonia on 30 June 1917. It drew its original personnel from Kampfgeschwader (tactical bomber wing) 1, Flieger-Abteilung (Flier Detachment) 30, and Jasta Vardar. The new squadron scored its first aerial victory on 29 October 1917.

== Commanding officers (Staffelführer) ==
- Rudolf Bohm: 1 July 1917
- Kurt Grasshoff: 6 November 1917
- Fritz Thiede: ca 12 June 1918

== Duty stations ==
- Hudova, Macedonia

== Notable personnel ==
Although the unit produced no flying aces on its own, commanders Kurt Grasshoff and Fritz Thiede were decorated aces.
