= Heinrich Kroll =

German World War I flying ace (1894-1930)

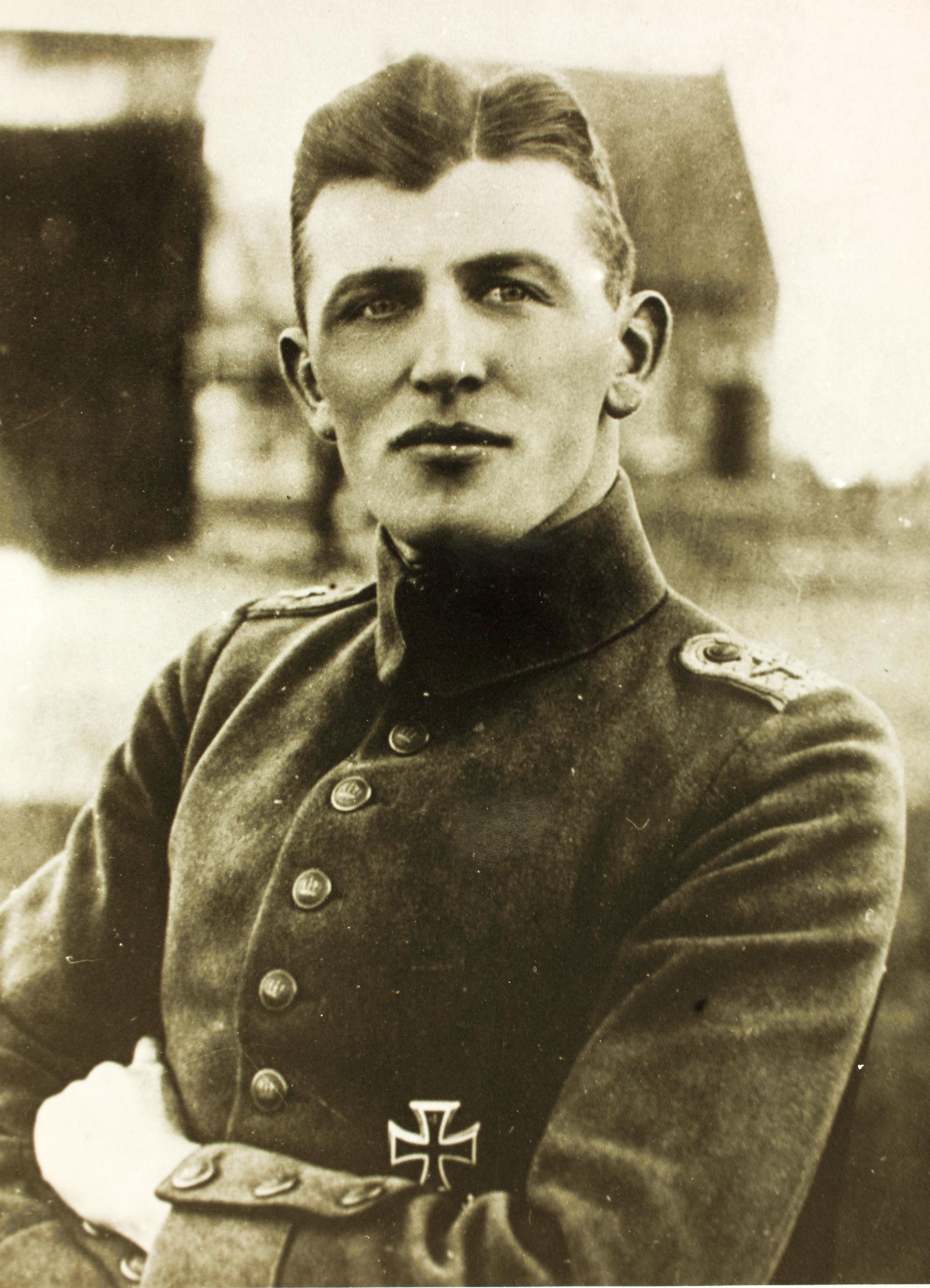
- Born: 3 November 1894; Flatzby, Schleswig-Holstein, Germany
- Died: 21 February 1930 (aged 35); Hamburg, Germany
- Burial place: Ohlsdorf Cemetery
- Military career
- Allegiance: Germany
- Branch: Infantry, Air Service
- Service years: 1914-1918
- Rank: Oberleutnant
- Units: Flieger-Abteilung 17; Jagdstaffel 9; Jagdstaffel 24
- Commands: Jagdstaffel 24, Jagdgruppe 12
- Awards: Pour le Merite; Royal House Order of Hohenzollern; Albert Order; Iron Cross

Oberleutnant Henrich Claudius Kroll (3 November 1894 – 21 February 1930) Pour le Merite, Knight's Cross of the Royal House Order of Hohenzollern, Saxony's Albert Order Knight Second Class with Swords, Iron Cross First and Second Class, was a World War I fighter ace credited with 33 victories.

== Early life ==
Kroll was born in the village of Flatzby near Flensburg, Germany, on 3 November 1894. He was the son of a school teacher. Kroll the younger also aspired to become a teacher. He passed his examinations at Kiel and was being credentialed as a teacher when World War I started. He was also active in athletics as a member of the Kiel sports club.

He volunteered for service in the Queen Augusta Victoria infantry regiment, Fusilier Regiment No. 86, in Flensburg, on 6 August 1914. From there he transferred into Reserve Regiment No. 92. He earned an Iron Cross Second Class, and was commissioned an officer in May 1915.

He then applied for a transfer to the Air Service in January 1916.

== Aerial service ==
=== Training and deployment ===
Kroll trained with Replacement Division 3 at Gotha. From there he went to Flieger-Abteilung 17 based at Rethel, France, to fly the Rumpler C.I. He was the only officer pilot in Flieger-Abteilung 17; commonly, in these early days of aviation reconnaissance the observer was an officer and the pilot a non-commissioned "chauffeur". Following this practice, Kroll's observer was Lieutenant Holzhausen.

In October, 1916, two new Albatros fighters were assigned to the unit, and Kroll started flying one occasionally. The unit was reorganized into Royal Prussian Jagdstaffel 9, operating Fokker E.IIIs.

On 12 February 1917, Kroll was awarded the Iron Cross First Class. It was about this time that Kroll wrote about the difficulty of confirming victories: "It is difficult to get confirmation of a victory–especially the first one! It must be confirmed by our own ground troops ... this is even more difficult if hazy conditions prevail."

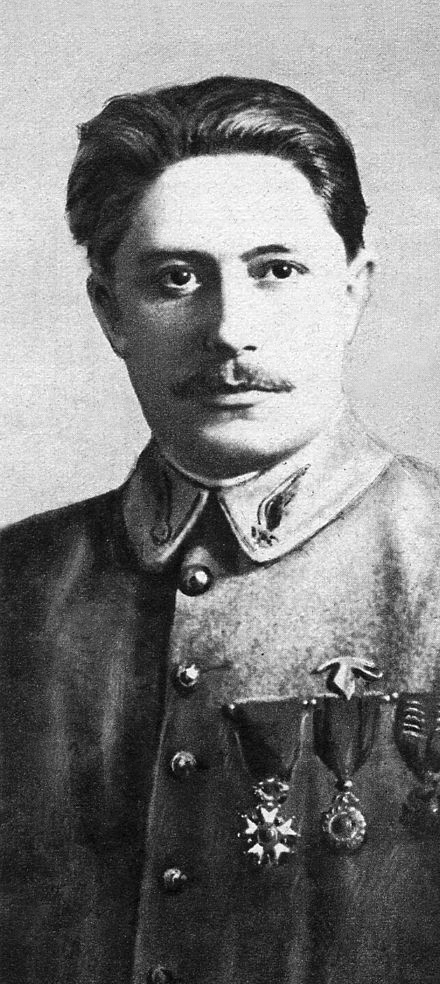
René Dorme

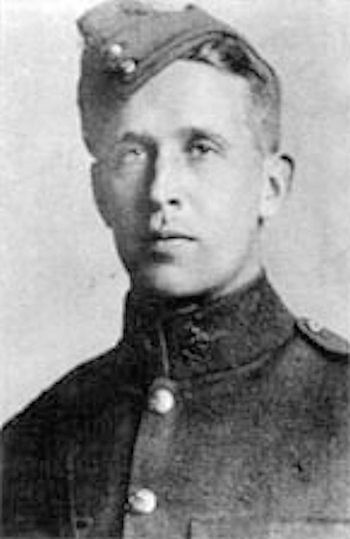
Clive Wildon Warman

After being shot down and forced to land by a Caudron in November 1916, Kroll's first victory was on 1 May 1917, over a Spad. He downed four more Spads in May, his fifth victory being one of the most significant victories; on 25 May 1917, he shot down and killed the man who was then the second highest scoring ace in the French Air Force, René Dorme. As Kroll's diary related, the two pilots had locked in a circling dogfight beginning at 5300 meters (about 17,400 feet) and devolving down to 800 meters (about 2600 feet). Dorme's Spad suddenly nosed over and barreled straight into the ground, bursting into flames upon impact. Dorme's body was so disfigured it could only be identified by his watch.

=== Kroll in command ===
This victory was influential in Kroll being appointed commanding officer of Royal Saxon Jasta 24 on 1 July 1917. He would command this unit, with brief interregnums, until just before the end of the war.

He would score once in July, on the 20th. On 27 July he was shot down in flames by Captain Clive W. Warman of No 23 Squadron, but escaped uninjured. Warman's machine gun fire set Kroll's airplane's carburetor on fire, but Kroll killed the engine to starve the flames, tore off his oily goggles so he could still see, and landed dead stick, trailing telephone wires.

On 27 September 1917 with his score at 12, he received the first Pfalz D.III assigned to his Jasta. The Pfalz would almost end his life. Kroll apparently still used his Albatros D.V, marked with a taijitu on a tan background. Kroll considered the Pfalz to be the Albatros's inferior in performance; he thought the Pfalz the slower of the two planes, climbed no better, but could be faster in a dive. Whichever aircraft he used, he rounded off 1917 by scoring his 15th victory on 4 December.

On 25 January 1918, after he shot down a Bristol F.2b Fighter for number 17, the rear spar of the Pfalz he was flying broke, and the left aileron tore badly, almost separating from the plane. It took all Kroll's skill to land safely. His complaint to higher authorities gained him a promise of three Fokker Dr.Is for his Jasta, but nothing else. He and his Jasta would have to suffer with Pfalzes until the new Fokker D.VII arrived on 28 May.

His 20th victory on 18 February brought an award of the Knight's Cross of the Royal House Order of Hohenzollern and made him eligible for the Pour le Merite. The "Blue Max" duly arrived on 29 March 1918.

On 25 May, his Jasta finally received Fokker D.VIIs. At about this time, Kroll also became the commander of Jagdgruppe 12, which consisted of his Jasta 24, and Jastas 44 and 79b. Kroll continued as Jasta 24's leading ace, steadily racking up his score, mostly against enemy fighters. An SE-5a fell on 9 August 1918 to finish his tally at 33.

On 14 August 1918 he was so seriously wounded in the left shoulder that he never flew in action again.

The 28 victories he scored with Jasta 24 made up almost a third of its 90 claims; he and Friedrich Altemeier combined for over half the squadron wins. Despite being handicapped by the poorly built Pfalz, the Jasta under Kroll's leadership had suffered only 15 casualties. Most striking of all, only four of Kroll's victims had been two-seater reconnaissance aircraft. Kroll shot down about as many enemy fighters as his more famous compatriot, Manfred von Richthofen.

== Post-war ==
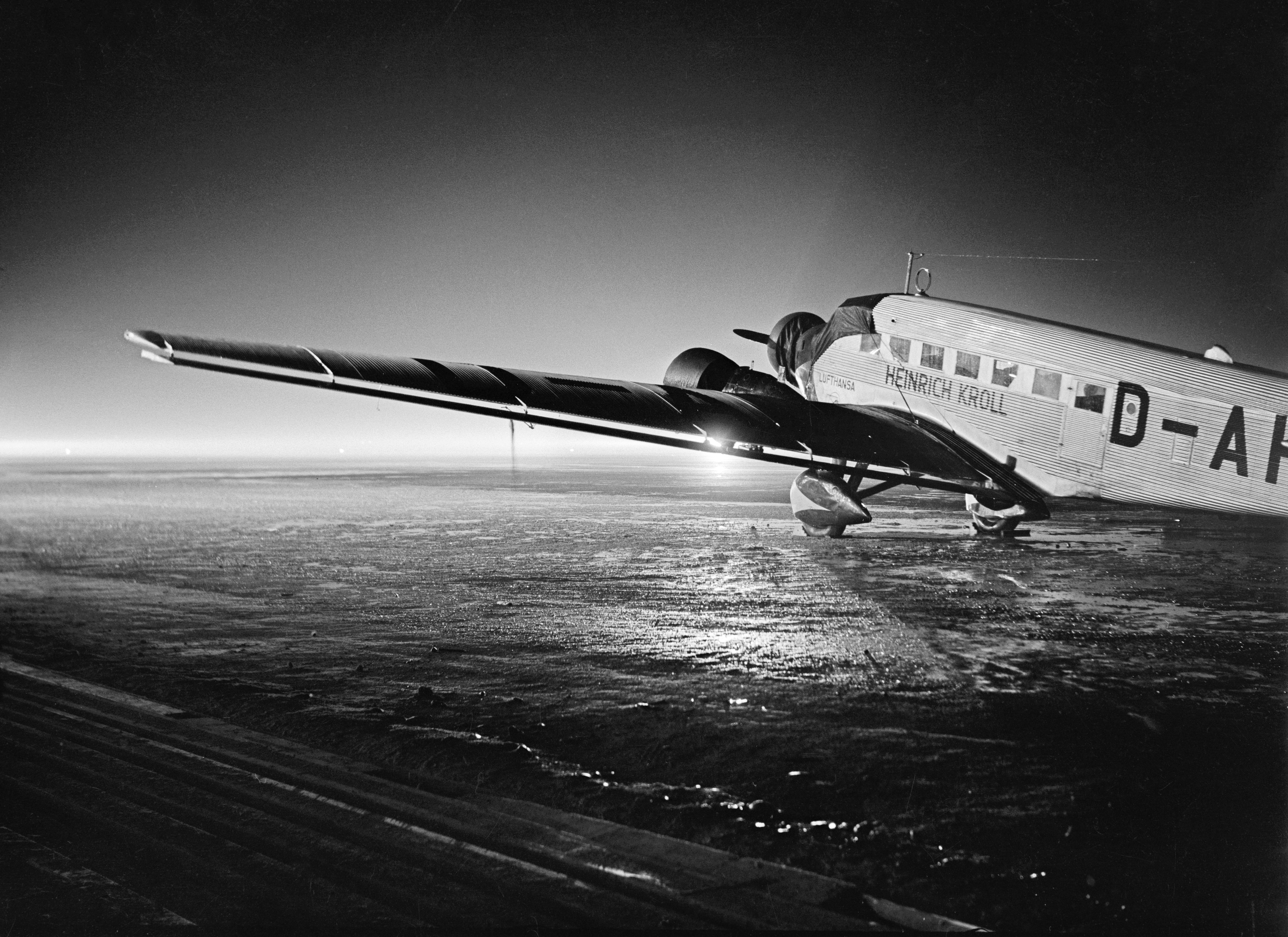
The Lufthansa Junkers 52 airplane Heinrich Kroll in Helsinki, Finland, 1937

The end of the war saw him an Oberleutnant. He then joined the Hamburg Police as a captain. While there he witnessed the attempted Kapp Putsch against the Weimar government. In its aftermath he recovered the body of fellow fighter ace Rudolf Berthold, who had been murdered by German communists.

There followed a quiet period during which he was a clerk.

He joined the Hamburg Flying Club in 1928 and reclaimed his pilot's license. He flew pioneer commercial aviation routes to Berlin and to the northern islands. He also used a Junkers F 13, which was the first all-metal civil aviation craft, for sightseeing flights over Hamburg.

He died of pneumonia on 21 February 1930.

The Luft Hansa later named one of its Junkers 52/3m transports Heinrich Kroll (D-AHUS, W.Nr.4049) to honor him.

== See also ==
- Kapp Putsch
