= Villeselve =

- Commune
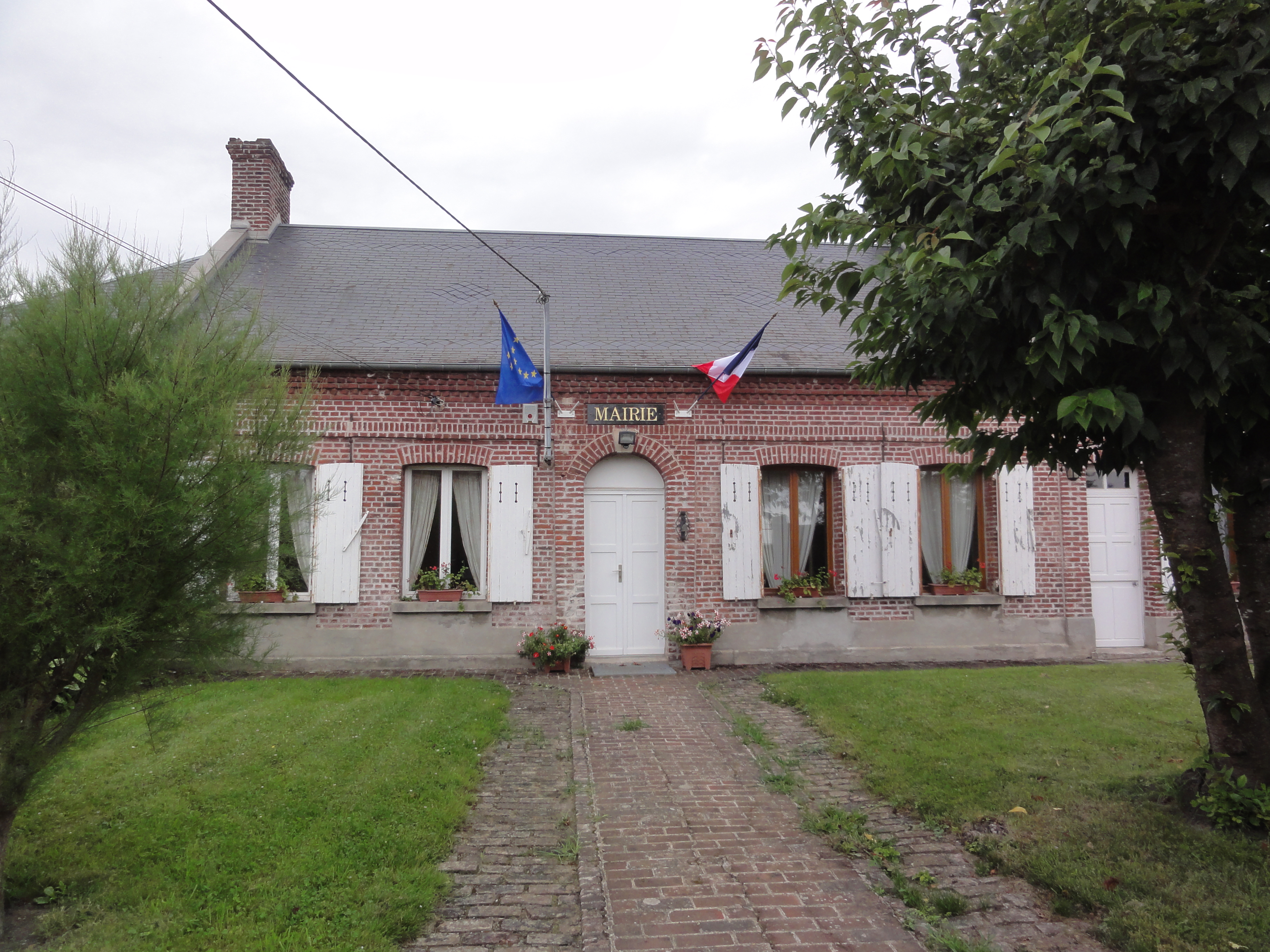
- The town hall in Villeselve
- Location of Villeselve
- Location within France Location within Hauts-de-France
- Coordinates: 49°41′29″N 3°06′41″E
- Country: France
- Region: Hauts-de-France
- Department: Oise
- Arrondissement: Compiègne
- Canton: Noyon
- Intercommunality: Pays Noyonnais

Government
  - Mayor (2020–2026): Thomas Défossé
- Area^{1}: 6.89 km^{2} (2.66 sq mi)
- Elevation: 90 m (300 ft)
- Highest elevation: 147 m (482 ft)
- Lowest elevation: 69 m (226 ft)
- Population (2023): 379
  - Density: 55.0/km^{2} (142/sq mi)
- Time zone: UTC+01:00 (CET)
  - Summer (DST): UTC+02:00 (CEST)
- INSEE/Postal code: 60693 /60640
- ^{1} French Land Register data, which excludes lakes, ponds, glaciers > 1 km^{2} (0.386 sq mi or 247 acres) and river estuaries.

Villeselve (French pronunciation: [vilsɛlv]) is a commune in the Oise department in northern France.

== Population ==
Historical population
Year	Pop.	±% p.a.
1968	325	—
1975	291	−1.57%
1982	267	−1.22%
1990	306	+1.72%
1999	360	+1.82%
2007	391	+1.04%
2012	377	−0.73%
2017	421	+2.23%
2023	379	−1.74%
Source: INSEE

== See also ==
- Communes of the Oise department
