= Karl Ritscherle =

German flying ace

Karl Waldemar Ritscherle
- Born: 1 May 1898; Karlsruhe, Grand Duchy of Baden, German Empire
- Died: 24 August 1940 (aged 42); Essex, England
- Military career
- Allegiance: Baden; German Empire; Nazi Germany
- Branch: Aviation
- Service years: 1914 – 1918, 1940
- Rank: Major
- Units: Badisches Leib-Dragoner Regiment No. 20; Schutzstaffel (Protection Squadron) 8; Jagdstaffel (Fighter Squadron) 60
- Awards: Iron Cross
- Other work: Rejoined and served in Luftwaffe in early World War II

Major Karl Waldemar Ritscherle (1 May 1898 – 24 August 1940) was a World War I flying ace credited with eight aerial victories. He served again in the World War II Luftwaffe, and was killed in action when his Heinkel He 111 was shot down and fell into Abberton Reservoir.

== Biography ==
Karl Waldemar Ritscherle was born in Karlsruhe, the Grand Duchy of Baden, in the German Empire on 1 May 1898. He enlisted in Baden's Badisches Leib-Dragoner Regiment No. 20 on 5 September 1914, at 16 years of age. He went off to serve on the Eastern Front. He was promoted to Unteroffizier on 21 June 1915. On 6 September 1916, he was awarded the Iron Cross Second Class. On 24 December 1916, at age 18, he was promoted to Vizewachtmeister.

In December 1916, he reported to Fliegerersatz-Abteilung (Replacement Detachment) 11 in Breslau. There he learned aerial gunnery, which got him posted to aerial observer duty aboard the Aviatik C.IIIs of Schutzstaffel (Protection Squadron) 8 on 16 April 1917. He scored his first aerial victory on 1 October 1917, when he downed a French Spad VII southeast of Fort Malmaison, France. On 8 November, he was credited with a second Spad, destroyed over Presles-et-Thierny. One week later, he was awarded the First Class Iron Cross. On 8 December 1917, his native Baden awarded him the Military Karl-Friedrich Merit Medal. On 23 December, he scored his third aerial victory by shooting down a Sopwith two-seater over Chaillevois. On 27 December 1917, he was commissioned as a Leutnant.

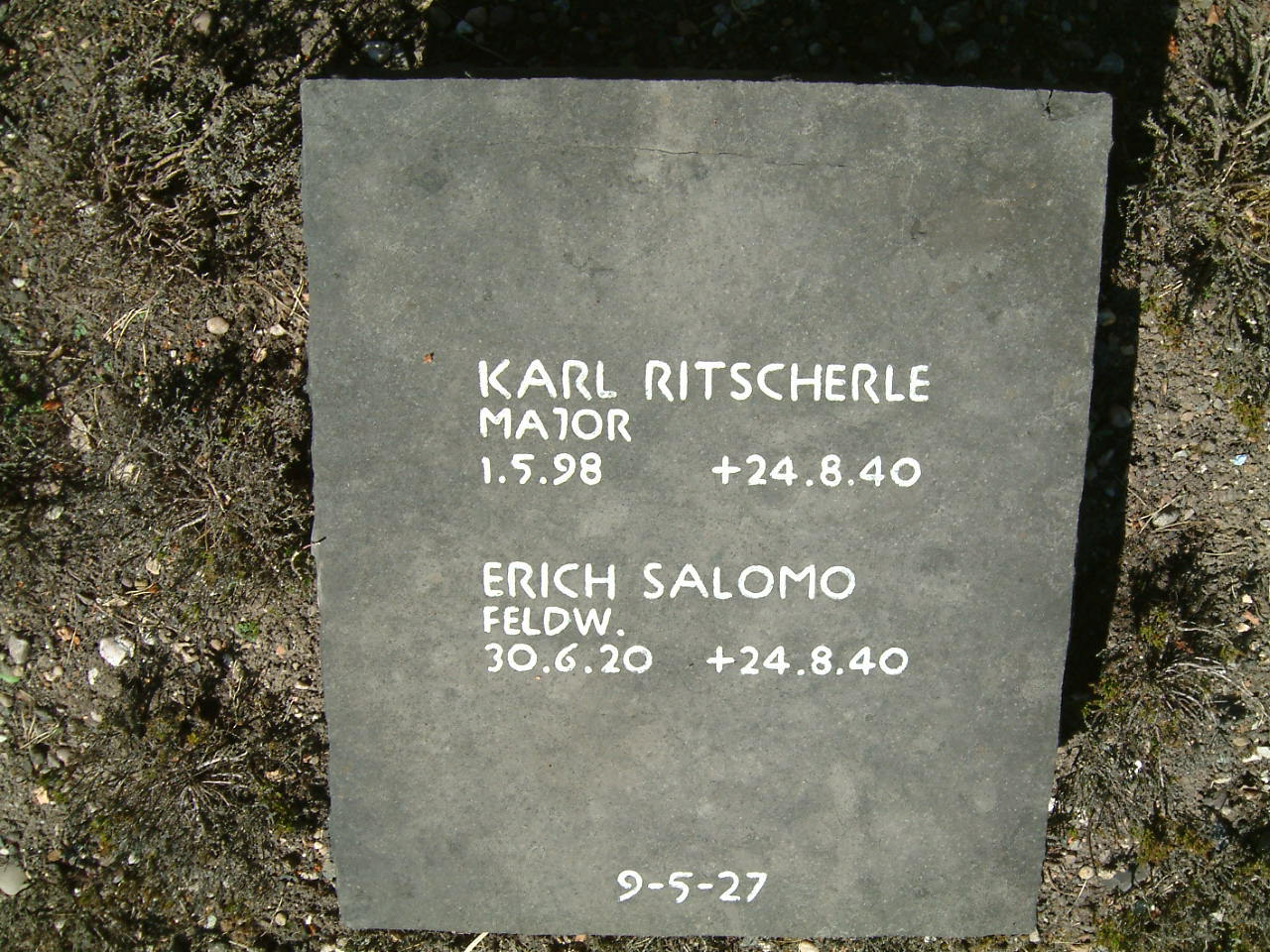
Graves of Karl Ritscherle (1898–1940) and Erich Salomo (1920–1940), Cannock Chase German Military Cemetery, Staffordshire, England (Block 9 Row 5 Grave 27)

On 7 January 1918, he was transferred to Fliegerersatz-Abteilung (Replacement Detachment) 1 as an instructor; he also learned to fly during this posting. On 22 June 1918, he was sent to a fighter squadron, Jagdstaffel 60, as a Fokker D.VII pilot. His aircraft bore the black and white checkerboard markings common to the elevators of Jasta 60 airplanes; his personal insignia was a three-pointed "star" on a white square painted on the side of the fuselage. He would use this machine to destroy four more Spads and a French observation balloon between 7 August and 3 October 1918. He was rewarded with the Knight's Cross with Swords of the Order of the Zahringer Lion on 18 September.

Ritscherle survived the war, and returned to duty for World War II ranked as a major. During the Battle of Britain, he was aboard a Heinkel He 111 as an observer of 9/KG53 that was shot down at 1600 hours on 24 August 1940 by Sgt W.L. Dymond of No. 111 Squadron RAF. He bailed out, but drowned in the South Essex waterworks, aged 42. He is buried at Cannock Chase German Military Cemetery, Staffordshire, England in a joint grave (Block 9, Row 5, Grave 27) with his colleague Feldwebel Erich Salomo, the aircraft's gunner, who was initially wounded and then killed when the aircraft dived into the ground.
