= Fritz Höhn =

- Born: 31 May 1896; Wiesbaden, Hesse-Nassau, German Empire
- Died: 3 October 1918 (aged 22); Saint-Martin-l'Heureux, France
- Military career
- Allegiance: German Empire
- Branch: Infantry, then flying service
- Rank: Leutnant
- Units: 7th Guards Infantry Regiment; Flieger-Abteilung (Flier Detachment) 227; Jagdstaffel 21; Jagdstaffel 60; Jagdstaffel 81
- Commands: Jagdstaffel 41
- Awards: Royal House Order of Hohenzollern, Iron Cross

Leutnant Fritz Höhn (31 May 1896 – 3 October 1918) was a German World War I fighter ace credited with 21 victories. He had worked his way up to being a fighter squadron commander and was eligible for the German Empire's highest award for heroism, the Blue Max, when he was killed in action on 3 October 1918.

== Early life and service ==
Fritz Höhn was born in Wiesbaden, German Empire, on 31 May 1896. He began his military service in the elite 7th Guards Infantry Regiment.

== Aerial service ==
Höhn began aerial duty as an artillery spotter in two-seated reconnaissance planes, flying for Flieger-Abteilung (Flier Detachment) 227. He was seconded to Jastaschule II and graduated as a fighter pilot. He joined a fighter squadron, Royal Saxon Jagdstaffel 21 on 15 November 1917, just as they received new Pfalz D.IIIs. He shot down a Breguet 14 bomber on 1 December 1917 for his first victory.

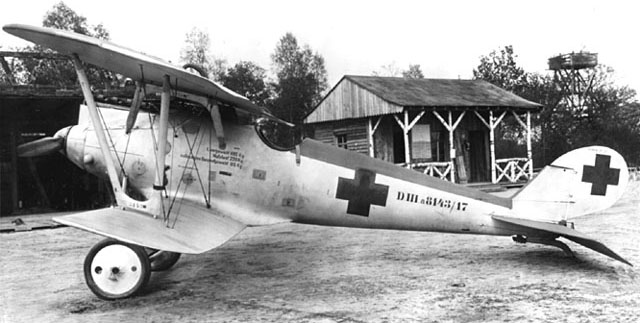
A representative Pfalz D.IIIa. Höhn's (serial number 4011/17) displayed diagonal stripes wrapping about the fuselage.

Höhn then had Pfalz no. 4011/17 painted with diagonal stripes to deceive the aim of anyone shooting at him. He also had two rearview mirrors and a teddy bear wired on the rear of the cockpit, facing tailwards. However, it is unknown if Höhn and his teddy bear mascot were successful with this particular plane. He did become a balloon buster for his next win, shooting down a French kite balloon from 33e Compagnie de Aerostiers on 11 April 1918. The next day, he downed a Spad and a balloon. On 20 April, he scored two victories on balloons—one from the 45e and 75e Compagnies—making him an ace. In the process, he was severely wounded in the knee.

Höhn would be out of action until August. By the time he could return to combat, he had been awarded both classes of the Iron Cross and the Knight's Cross of the Royal House Order of Hohenzollern. Beginning on 20 August 1918, he added two more enemy aircraft and two more observation balloons to his tally by month's end. That made him a double ace, with ten victories, and a balloon ace, with six.

== Höhn in command ==
Towards the end of the month, Höhn had a fleeting assignment as commander of Royal Prussian Jagdstaffel 81 that lasted until 3 September. He shot down a Spad on both 2 and 3 September. For the rest of the month of September 1918, Höhn was the acting commander of Royal Prussian Jagdstaffel 60. While with them, he scored two Spads and four more balloons.

He then was given command of Royal Prussian Jagdstaffel 41. He scored each of the first three days of October 1918, running his total to 21. He was killed in action on 3 October 1918. His Fokker D.VII was downed by a member of French squadron Spa67. Neither his dual rear-view mirrors nor his teddy bear mascot saved him.

Höhn's final victory total was ten balloons and eleven airplanes. If he had survived, he would have been eligible for the German Empire's highest honor for valor, the Pour le Merite, upon confirmation of his 20th victory.

== Sources ==
- Franks, Norman; Bailey, Frank W.; Guest, Russell. Above the Lines: The Aces and Fighter Units of the German Air Service, Naval Air Service and Flanders Marine Corps, 1914–1918. Grub Street, 1993. ISBN 0-948817-73-9, ISBN 978-0-948817-73-1.
- Franks, Norman; Van Wyngarden (2004). Fokker D VII Aces of World War 1, Part 2. Osprey Publishing. ISBN 978-1-84176-729-1.
- Van Wyngarden, Greg (2006). Pfalz Scout Aces of World War 1. Osprey Publishing. ISBN 978-1-84176-998-1.
