= Alfons Nagler =

WWI fighter pilot

- Born: 4 August 1893; Ertingen, Kingdom of Württemberg
- Died: Unknown
- Military career
- Allegiance: Germany
- Branch: Aviation
- Rank: Vizefeldwebel
- Units: FA 4, FA(A) 220, Jasta Ober-Ost, Jasta 74, Jasta 81
- Awards: Iron Cross First and Second Class

Vizefeldwebel Alfons Nagler, also Alfons Nagler, (born 4 August 1893, date of death unknown) was a World War I flying ace credited with ten aerial victories.

== Early life ==
Alfons Nagler was born on 4 August 1893 in Ertingen, Kingdom of Württemberg, the German Empire. As part of his education, he trained as a mechanic. As a mechanic, he enlisted in the Imperial German Air Service as a reservist on 4 October 1913.

== World War I service ==
Nagler was in the reserves when World War I began. He served as a mechanic in FA 4 until 6 May 1915, when he reported for pilot training. Upon graduation, he was stationed with FA(A) 220 on the Russian Front on 8 October. He served with this unit until 27 September 1917. He then served with the fighter unit attached to FA(A) 220 until 10 December. Then he was transferred to Jasta Over-Ost. From there, he was forwarded on 26 March 1918 to Jagdstaffel 74. When Jasta Over-Ost became Jagdstaffel 81, Nagler rejoined them. Between 27 May and 5 October 1918, he ran up a score of nine Spads and a Breguet XIV shot down. By the time the war ended, he had earned not only the Iron Cross, but two Austro-Hungarian medals and one from Baden.
