= Jagdstaffel 81 =

Jasta 81
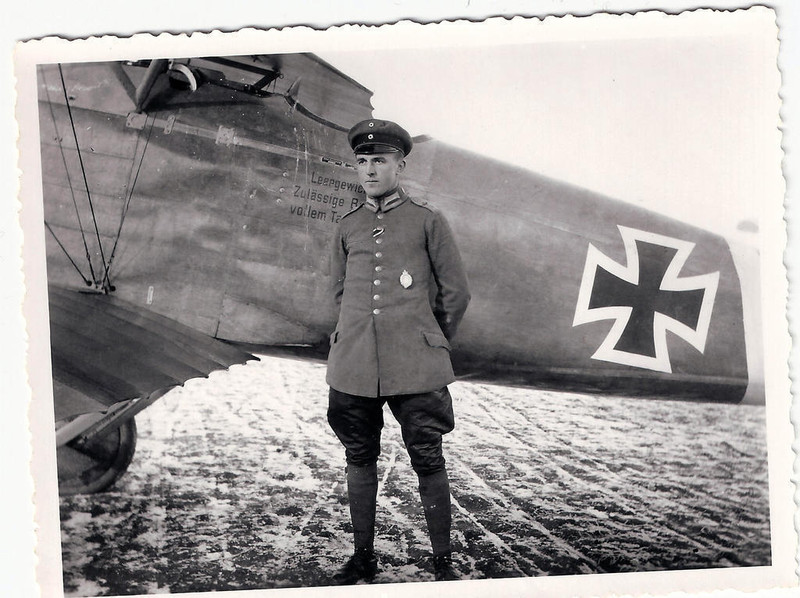
- 15 September 1917: Ace Dietrich Averes of Jasta 81 beside his Albatros D.III
- Active: 1917–1918
- Country: Kingdom of Prussia; German Empire
- Branch: Luftstreitkräfte
- Type: Fighter squadron
- Engagements: World War I

Royal Prussian Jagdstaffel 81, commonly abbreviated to Jasta 81, was a "hunting group" (i.e., fighter squadron) of the Luftstreitkräfte, the air arm of the Imperial German Army during World War I. The squadron would score six or more aerial victories during July/August 1917, while serving on the Eastern Front. After switching to the Western Front, Jasta 81 would score another 35 victories from May 1918 to war's end. The unit's victories came at the expense of five killed in action, three killed in flying accidents, one injured in a flying accident, three wounded in action, and three taken prisoner of war.

== History ==
Jasta 81 originated in Jagdflieger Ober-Ost, which was founded at Brest-Litovsk on 16 June 1917. It was intended for service on the Eastern Front. In August 1917, it was assigned to 8 Armee. In early May 1918, it was incorporated into Jagdgruppe 5. On 30 May 1918, it was revamped as Jasta 81. At this time, the squadron was posted to 7 Armee on the Western Front in France. On 27 June 1918, it was switched over to Jagdgruppe 4; in late July, it would return to JG 5. In late September 1918, the Jasta would be assigned to 3 Armee.

== Commanding officers (Staffelführer) ==
- Josef Wulf
- Herbert Knappe: 7 April 1918 - 25 August 1918 (WIA)
- Fritz Höhn: c. 25 August 1918 - 9 September 1918
- Wilhelm Pritsch: 9 September 1918

== Duty stations ==
- Kniaze: July 1917
- Mitau (present day Latvia): August 1917
- Boncourt, France
- Moislains, France
- Séranvillers, France: August 1918
- Leffincourt, France: Late September 1918
- Two successive unknown locations
- Saint-Gerard-Maison: 26 October 1918 - November 1918

== Notable personnel ==
- Dietrich Averes
- Alfons Nagler

== Aircraft ==
In late 1917, Jasta 81 was supplied with LFG Roland D.II fighters.
