= Cross for Distinction in War =

Imperial German wartime decoration

Cross for Distinction in War (German: Kreuz für Auszeichnung im Kriege)
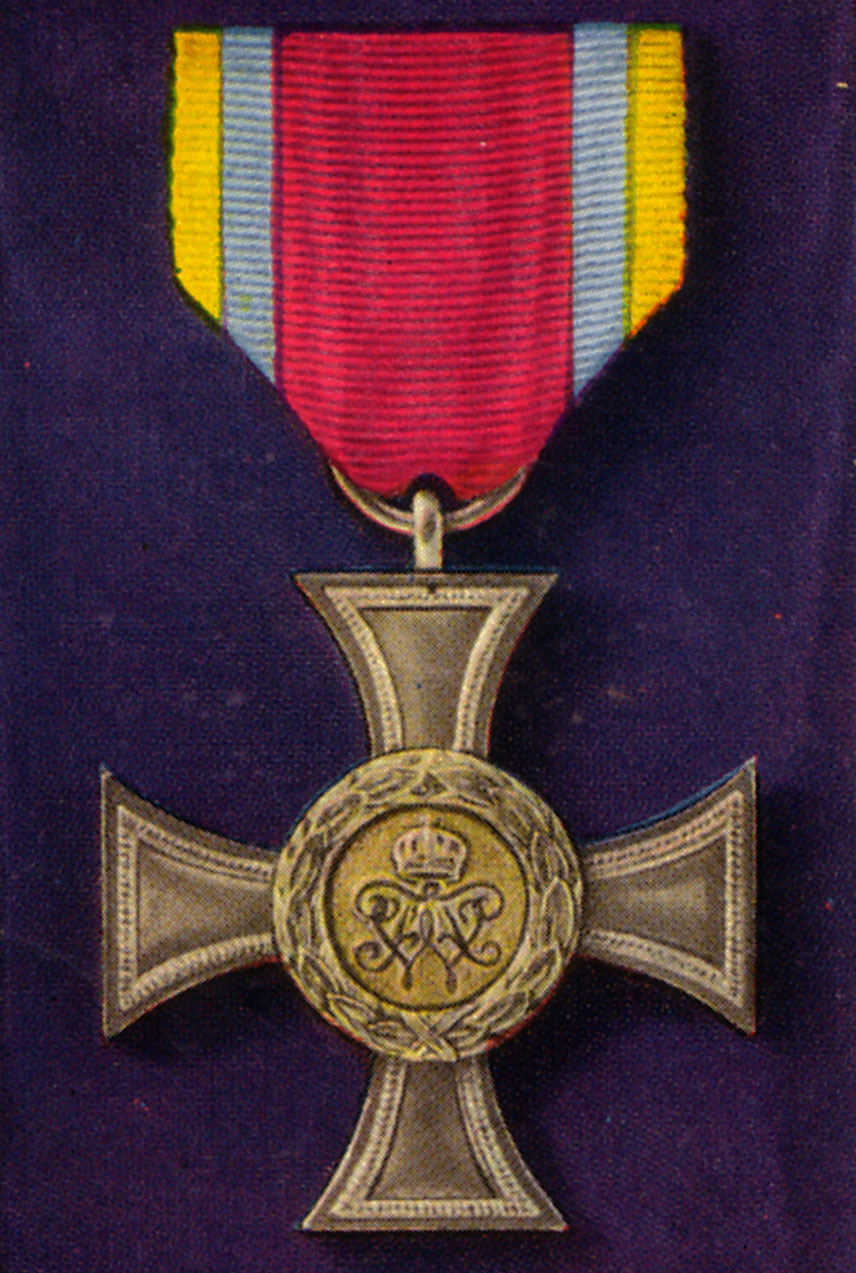
- Reverse view of a 1914 cross on the non-combatant ribbon
- Type: Military decoration
- Awarded for: Bravery or other wartime distinction
- Description: Silver cross
- Country: German Empire
- Presented by: Grand Duchy of Mecklenburg-Strelitz
- Eligibility: Officers, non-commissioned officers and enlisted men
- Campaigns: Franco-Prussian War; World War I
- Status: No longer awarded
- Established: 10 March 1871; 11 August 1914
- First award: 1871
- Final award: 1923

Highlights
- Total: 513 (1871); 7,486 (1914 2nd class); 288 (1914 1st class)

Precedence
- Next (higher): Merit Cross of the Order of the Wendish Crown
- Next (lower): Adolf Friedrich Cross

The Cross for Distinction in War (German:Kreuz für Auszeichnung im Kriege) was a wartime decoration of the Grand Duchy of Mecklenburg-Strelitz, a member state of the German Empire.

== Establishment ==
On 10 March 1871, the cross was instituted by Grand Duke Frederick William to be conferred on military personnel who had distinguished themselves during the Franco-Prussian War of 1870–71. Upon the outbreak of World War I, Grand Duke Adolphus Frederick VI re-instituted the decoration on 11 August 1914. The monarchy of Mecklenburg-Strelitz was overthrown during the German revolution of 1918–1919 that followed Germany's defeat in the war, but the decorations continued to be issued for past war service until 1923.

== Eligibility ==
The cross was initially awarded to officers, non-commissioned officers, enlisted men, and military officials in recognition of distinguished service during the war of 1870–71. Initially, it was awarded only to combatants. On 27 July 1905, the statute was amended to authorize awards to non-combatants.

== Description ==
The decoration consisted of a silver cross with straight-ended arms. A raised, ribbed inner border ran around the outer edge of each arm. The inner panels were slightly domed and highly polished. Both the obverse and reverse featured a round central medallion. A small suspension loop was attached to the upper arm of the cross to attach it to a ribbon ring. The cross was 40-mm-wide and weighed 14 grams. Toward the end of 1916, in the midst of World War I, the composition of the cross was changed to silver-plated bronze and then to a zinc alloy. The crosses were manufactured by Godet & Sohn in Berlin.

Obverse: The raised border of the medallion consisted of a laurel wreath tied at the bottom. The enclosed circle was finely stippled. Upon it was a three-line raised inscription in capital letters: TAPFER UND TREU (brave and loyal). When conferred upon members of royal or princely houses, the inscription read FÜR TAPFERKEIT (for bravery).

Reverse: The raised border of the medallion was formed by a laurel wreath tied at the bottom. The central field was finely stippled. In raised relief was the intertwined archducal monogram: "F W" in ornate Latin script with the F presented in a mirror image. Above this was the image of a crown. The year "1871" appeared on the lower arm of the cross. In the 1914 version, the monogram on the medallion was changed to that of the reigning grand duke, "A F", with the year "1914" on the lower arm.

== Ribbon and placement ==
The decoration was worn on the left breast, suspended from a 29-mm-wide ribbon. For combatants, the ribbon was light blue, with lemon-yellow and poppy-red stripes on each side, each 3-mm-wide. For non-combatants, the ribbon was crimson with light blue side stripes, each 3-mm-wide, followed by golden-yellow edge stripes, each 2-mm-wide.

== Creation of the first class award ==
On 1 January 1915, the decoration was expanded to become a two class award. The original cross was designated as the 2nd class, and a 1st class award was created to recognize "repeated outstanding bravery in the face of the enemy". It took the form of a silver cross with a vertical pin-back, bearing the inscription FÜR TAPFERKEIT. The cross was made of silver until early 1917 when it was changed to silver-plated metal. The cross was 40-mm-wide and weighed 21 grams. It was worn pinned on the left side of the chest, below the ribbon bar.

== Number awarded ==
The 1871 version was awarded 283 times between 1871 and 1872, After 1905, when non-combatants were authorized to receive the cross, it was awarded to an additional 230 recipients. The 1914 2nd class silver version was awarded 4,245 times, and the silver-plated version was awarded 3,241 times. The manufacturer of the 1st class cross supplied a total of 288 crosses, 165 of which were made of silver.

== Selected recipients ==
- Prince Adalbert of Prussia (1871)
- Adolphus Frederick V (1871)
- Adolphus Frederick VI (1914)
- Alexander III of Russia (1871)
- Prince Aribert of Anhalt (1914)
- Arno Benzler (1914)
- Bernhard von Bülow (1871)
- Prince Charles of Prussia (1871)
- Theodor Duesterberg (1914)
- Prince Eitel Friedrich of Prussia (1914)
- Franz Joseph I (1914)
- Frederick III, German Emperor (1871)
- Frederick, Prince of Hohenzollern (1914)
- Frederick Francis III (1871)
- Prince Friedrich Karl of Prussia (1871)
- Prince Friedrich Leopold of Prussia (1914)
- Kurt von Hammerstein-Equord (1914)
- Paul von Hindenburg (1914)
- Prince Karl Anton of Hohenzollern (1914)
- Albrecht Gustav von Manstein (1871)
- Helmuth von Moltke the Elder (1871)
- Prince Oskar of Prussia (1914)
- Duke Paul Frederick of Mecklenburg (1871)
- Albrecht von Roon (1871)
- Helmuth Wilberg (1914)
- William, Prince of Hohenzollern (1914)

== Sources ==
- Hessenthal, Waldemar von; Schreiber, Georg (2001). Honours and Awards of the German States. Naval & Military Press. ISBN 978-1-843-42144-3.
- Kreuz für Auszeichnung im Kriege 1871 in the Ehrenzeichen-Orden website
- Kreuz für Auszeichnung im Kriege 2.Klasse 1914 in the Ehrenzeichen-Orden website
- Kreuz für Auszeichnung im Kriege 1. Klasse in the Ehrenzeichen-Orden website
