= Jagdstaffel 74 =

Jasta 74
- Active: 1918
- Country: Kingdom of Prussia, German Empire
- Branch: Luftstreitkräfte
- Type: Fighter squadron
- Engagements: World War I

Royal Prussian Jagdstaffel 74, commonly abbreviated to Jasta 74, was a "hunting group" (i.e., fighter squadron) of the Luftstreitkräfte, the air arm of the Imperial German Army during World War I. The squadron would score over 22 aerial victories during the war, including a night time victory. The unit's victories came at the expense of one pilot killed in action, one wounded in action, and one taken prisoner of war.

== History ==
Jasta 74 was founded at Fliegerersatz-Abteilung ("Replacement Detachment") 1 at Altenberg on 16 February 1918. The new squadron became operational on the 25th. On 8 March 1918, it was posted to 1 Armee. The fighter squadron drew first blood on 3 April 1918.

== Commanding officers (Staffelführer) ==
- Theodor Camman: circa 16 February 1918 – 22 August 1918 (WIA)
- Leutnant Neumann (acting): 22 August 1918 – 1 October 1918
- Theodor Camman: 1 October 1918 – war's end

== Duty stations ==
- Bergnicourt, France: 8 March 1918
- Saint-Loup, France: 28 March 1918
- Prentin: 15 September 1918 - war's end

== Notable personnel ==
- Alfons Nagler
