= Jagdstaffel 60 =

Jasta 60
- Active: 1918
- Country: Kingdom of Prussia, German Empire
- Branch: Luftstreitkräfte
- Type: Fighter squadron
- Engagements: World War I

Royal Prussian Jagdstaffel 60, commonly abbreviated to Jasta 60, was a "hunting group" (i.e., fighter squadron) of the Luftstreitkräfte, the air arm of the Imperial German Army during World War I. The squadron would score over 52 aerial victories during the war, including seven observation balloons downed. The unit's victories came at the expense of six pilots killed in action, three wounded in action, one injured in a flying accident, and two taken prisoner of war.

== History ==
On 11 January 1918, Jasta 60 was formed at the pilots and observers training school at Juterbog, Germany. The new squadron began operations on the 24th. On 8 March 1918, it scored its first aerial victory. On 29 July 1918, it was incorporated into Jagdgruppe 4 with 7 Armee. Jasta 60 would serve through war's end.

== Commanding officers (Staffelführer) ==
- Freiherr von Rudno-Rudzinski: 11 January 1918 – May 1918 (MIA)
- Arno Benzler: 26 May 1918
- Fritz Höhn: September 1918 (during Benzler's home leave)

== Duty stations ==
Unknown.

== Notable personnel ==
- Arno Benzler
- Fritz Höhn
- Karl Ritscherle
