= Arno Benzler =

German pilot during First World War

- Born: 14 October 1895; Sterkrade, Oberhausen
- Died: Unknown
- Military career
- Rank: Leutnant
- Units: Jagdstaffel 32; Jagdstaffel 45
- Commands: Jagdstaffel 65; Jagdstaffel 60
- Awards: Iron Cross, 1st class Cross for Distinction in War, 1st class

Arno Benzler was a German World War I flying ace and aerial commander with the rank of Leutnant who was credited with nine confirmed aerial victories.

== World War I service ==
Benzler served with Jagdstaffel 32 from 14 February to 22 December 1917; he then transferred to Jagdstaffel 45. On 7 March 1918, he was appointed to temporary command of Jagdstaffel 65. At some point prior, on a now unknown date, Benzler had had his first confirmed victory. On 13 March 1918, he scored his second. On 16 March, he scored again. On 18 March, he transferred back to Jagdstaffel 45. While with them, he shot down an enemy observation balloon on 12 April 1918. On 27 May, he was appointed as Staffelführer of Jagdstaffel 60. He scored three times in June, on the 2nd, 4th, and 23rd. He rounded out his list with triumphs on 4 and 7 August 1918. He was wounded in action on 5 October 1918, but remained in command until the Armistice of 11 November 1918.

== Decorations ==
Benzler's exploits earned him the rarely awarded Cross for Distinction in War, 1st class, from the Grand Duchy of Mecklenburg-Strelitz, as well as the Iron Cross, 1st class.

== Sources ==
- Above the Lines: The Aces and Fighter Units of the German Air Service, Naval Air Service and Flanders Marine Corps, 1914-1918 (1993). Norman L. R. Franks, Frank W. Bailey, Russell Guest. Grub Street. ISBN 0-948817-73-9, ISBN 978-0-948817-73-1.
