= Herbert Knappe =

German flying ace

Herbert Wilhelm Franz Knappe
- Born: 18 January 1891; Glatz i. Schl., German Empire (present day Poland)
- Died: Unknown
- Military career
- Allegiance: Germany
- Branch: Aviation
- Rank: Leutnant
- Units: Feldflieger Abteilung 21 (Field Flier Detachment 21); Jagdstaffel Ober-Ost (Upper East Fighter Squadron); Jagdstaffel 73 (Fighter Squadron 73)
- Commands: Jagdstaffel 81 (Fighter Squadron 81)
- Awards: Knight's Cross with Swords of the House Order of Hohenzollern

Leutnant Herbert Wilhelm Franz Knappe was a German flying ace during World War I. He was credited with nine confirmed aerial victories while fighting on both the Russian Front and Western Front.

== World War I service ==
Herbert Wilhelm Franz Knappe was born in Glatz i. Schl. on 18 January 1891. Knappe joined the Luftstreitkräfte in September 1914. He was commissioned Leutnant on 17 May 1916. He scored his first victory the following month, on 5 June, while flying with Feld-Fleiger Abteilung 21. He used an Albatros D.II to down a Russian airplane.

His second triumph would not come for almost two years. From Feldflieger Abteilung 21 (Field Flier Detachment 21), Knappe would be posted to Jagdstaffel Ober-Ost (Upper East Fighter Squadron), then on to join Jagdstaffel 81 (Fighter Squadron 81) in France. He began 1918 with receipt of the House Order of Hohenzollern on 9 January. On 31 May 1918, he shot down a SPAD S.XIII over Remigny. On 7 June, he took out an enemy observation balloon at Fleury-la-Rivière. Two days later, he shot down an AR2. A week after that, on 16 June, he himself was shot down for the second time.

Knappe's 22 July 1918 victory over a SPAD made him an ace. He would run off a string of four more victories, on 4, 7, 10, and 11 August 1918. On 25 August 1918, Knappe was wounded so severely he could not return to combat before war's end.
