= Erisdorf =

Coordinates: 48°07′N 9°29′E

Erisdorf is a small village in Upper Suebia (South Württemberg, Germany), about 3 km north of the main community Ertingen, in the direction of Riedlingen.

== Description ==
The population of 449 (2009) live on a village area of about 5.27 km² at an altitude of 560 to 580 m above sea level.

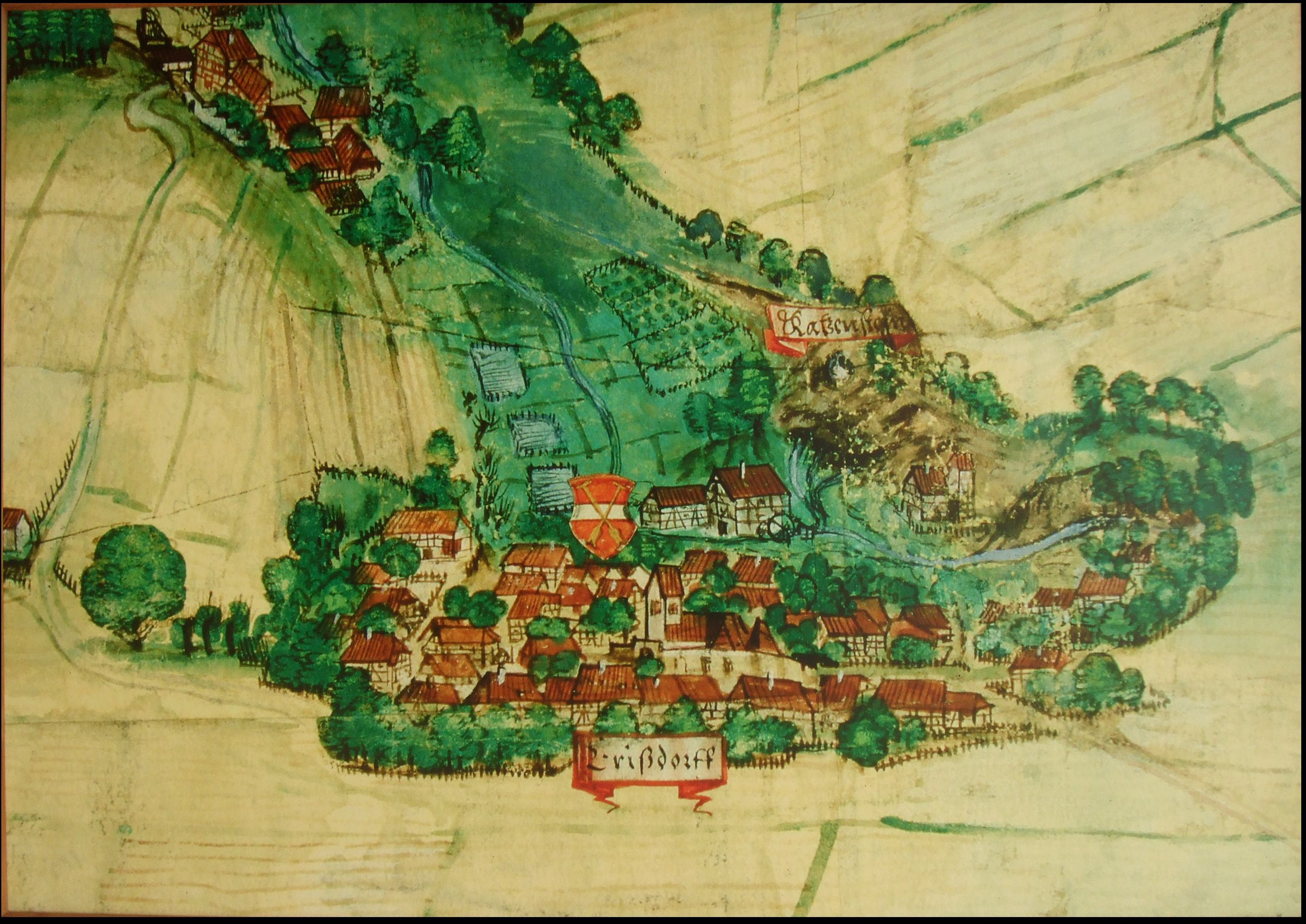
Painting of Erisdorf 1589 by Philipp Renlin

== History ==
In 1311, Erisdorf was mentioned first on the occasion of the sale of the lands of Lord Henry, called "Flekle", a knight, to the Salem monastery. In the sales documents its name was rendered as "Eringsdorf".

The supremacy over the village went to the Lords of Hornstein, then to the Lords of Reischach, In 1398, it was taken over by the Hospice of the Holy Spirit in Riedlingen that had been founded in 1378 by Konrad Manopp, the parish priest, having acquired 22 pieces of land as early as 1378, and enlarging its property even later on by the purchase of a mill.

In 1403, the Abbey of Reichenau gave new tenures to it. Until the rule of Württemberg in 1805 the Riedlingen Hospice or its curator, the mayor and council of the town, had the jurisdiction, elected the head of the council, and chose the 12 lawyers from the village.

Parochially, however, Erisdorf was part of Ertingen. An early mass has been held since 1403, but it was not until 1837 that it became an independent parish.

== Folklore ==
Erisdorf takes also part in reanimating the Suebian traditions of "Fasnet". The Erisdorf type of carnival is marked by the colourful rites and ceremonies of the "Röthenbächler". Their costumes are blue and remind of the professional habit of millers in the 16th century. The name is taken from the stream in Erisdorf which once powered the village mill.

One of the traditional festivals in Erisdorf, attracting a great number of visitors from surrounding villages, is the so-called "festival of the noodles" ("Nudlafescht"), where home-made noodles ranging from plain noodles over "Spätzle" to the "cigar noodles" reminding of cigars in shape and with a sweet taste.
