= Ertingen =

- Municipality
- Coat of arms

- Location of Ertingen within Biberach district
- Interactive map of Ertingen
- Location within Germany Location within Baden-Württemberg
- Coordinates: 48°6′N 9°28′E
- Country: Germany
- State: Baden-Württemberg
- Admin. region: Tübingen
- District: Biberach

Government
  - Mayor (2022–30): Jürgen Köhler

Area
  - Total: 37.74 km^{2} (14.57 sq mi)
- Elevation: 569 m (1,867 ft)

Population (2025-12-31)
  - Total: 5,375
  - Density: 142.4/km^{2} (368.9/sq mi)
- Time zone: UTC+01:00 (CET)
  - Summer (DST): UTC+02:00 (CEST)
- Postal codes: 88521
- Dialling codes: 07371
- Vehicle registration: BC
- Website: www.ertingen.de

Ertingen (German pronunciation: [ˈɛɐ̯tɪŋən]) is a municipality in the district of Biberach in Upper Swabia, South Württemberg, Germany. Since the reform of 1975 it comprises Ertingen and the smaller communities, Erisdorf and Binzwangen, which had been independent before. Each of the three communities can look back to a long history.

Having been largely agricultural in the past, the three communities have developed into places with a mixed population, consisting largely of industrial workers.

Owing to her companies whose performance is far above average, Ertingen has acquired the function of a centre of commerce and industry for the region.

In the course of time a large number of jobs in non-agricultural fields have been created. But there is still demand for jobs in trade and industry.

Ertingen will probably be rated as a so-called "subcentre" in the future regional planning.

Ertingen offers public services, like primary and secondary schools, a swimming pool, a nursing home with 48 beds, kindergartens, and an adult education centre.

The "Schwarzachtalseen" (Lakes in the Valley of the Black River) offer recreational facilities, especially for surfing, swimming and fishing. There are two seas for recreation and sports, and two "natural" seas for the preservation of nature.

The large forest areas of the community (6,6 km²) offer recreation, too. The "blind lake" is a favourite target for hikers.

More than 40 clubs show the high social involvement of the citizens, also visible from the numerous festivities.

One of the highlights of Ertingen folklore is the "fastnet", the special form of carnival of Suebia, with its traditional processions, costumes and ceremonies. As Carnival traditions may vary considerably from village to village. The Ertingen tradition is marked by the so-called "Daiberhexen" (witches), the "gloggasaeger" (literally "bell-sawers"), and the "Röthenbächler" (named after a stream in Erisdorf which once powered a watermill. These carnival associations are famous for their colourful costumes and masks in all Upper Suebia.

== Sources ==
- Official Web site
- Narrengesellschaft (in German)
