= Fokker D.VII =

1918 fighter aircraft model by Fokker

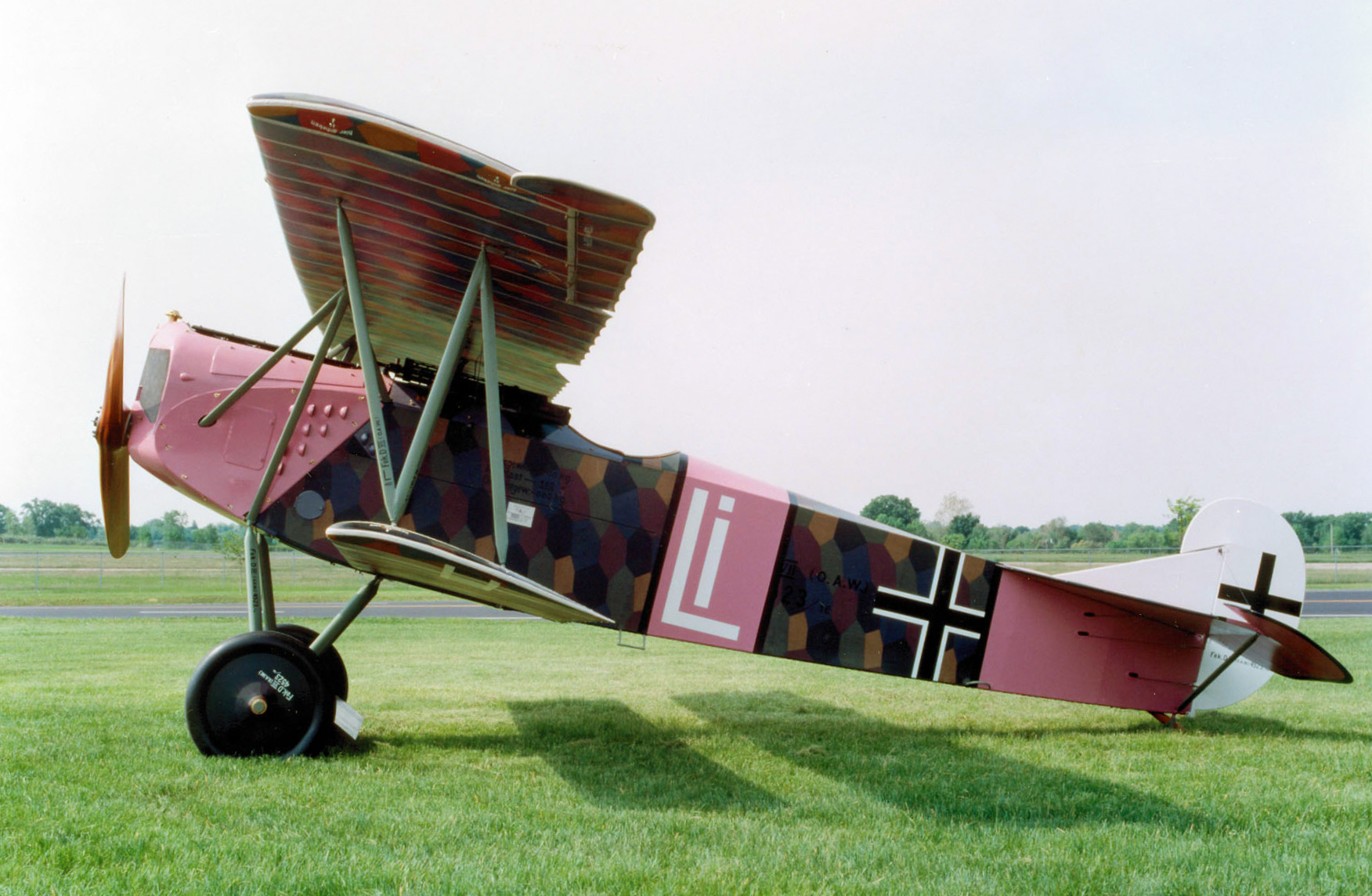
- Fokker D.VII reproduction at the NMUSAF. The aircraft is painted in the colors of Leutnant Rudolf Stark of Jasta 35b.

General information
- Type: Fighter
- Manufacturer: Fokker-Flugzeugwerke
- Designer: Reinhold Platz
- Primary user: Luftstreitkräfte
- Number built: Approximately 3,300

History
- First flight: January 1918

The Fokker D.VII is a German World War I fighter aircraft designed by Reinhold Platz of the Fokker-Flugzeugwerke. Germany produced around 3,300 D.VII aircraft in the second half of 1918. In service with the Luftstreitkräfte, the D.VII quickly proved itself to be a formidable aircraft. The Armistice ending the war specifically required, as the fourth clause of the "Clauses Relating to the Western Front", that Germany was required to surrender all D.VIIs to the Allies. Surviving aircraft saw much service with many countries in the years after World War I.

== Development and production ==
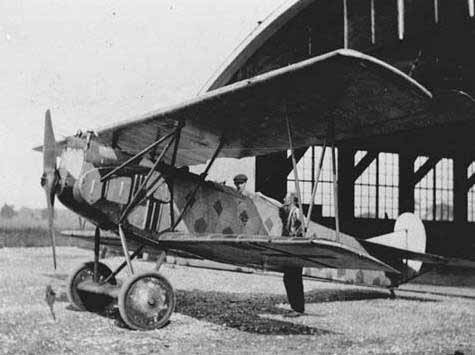
Fokker D.VII (OAW) 8909/18

Fokker's chief designer, Reinhold Platz, had been working on a series of experimental V-series aircraft, starting in 1916. The aircraft were notable for the use of cantilever wings. Hugo Junkers and his aviation firm had originated the idea in 1915 with the first practical all-metal aircraft, the Junkers J 1 monoplane, nicknamed Blechesel (Sheet Metal Donkey or Tin Donkey). The wings were thick, with a rounded leading edge. The shape of the wings' airfoil gave greater lift, with its relatively "blunt" leading edge (as seen in cross-section) giving it more docile stalling behavior than the thin wings commonly in use.

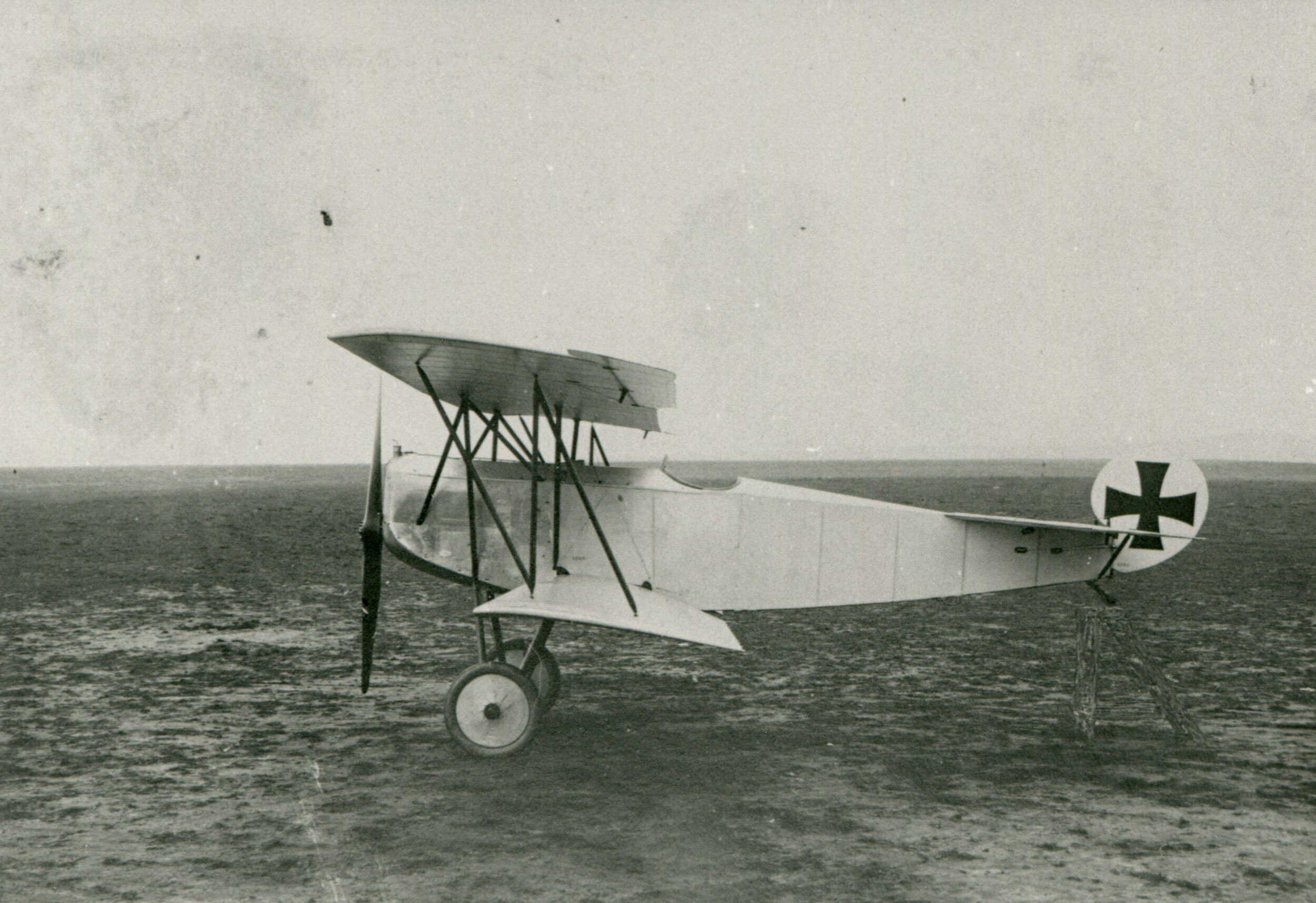
Fokker's V.11 prototype, direct precursor to the production D.VII

Late in 1917, Fokker built the experimental V 11 biplane, fitted with the standard Mercedes D.IIIa engine. In January 1918, Idflieg held a fighter competition at Adlershof. For the first time, front line pilots participated in the evaluation and selection of new fighters. Fokker submitted the V 11 along with several other prototypes. Manfred von Richthofen flew the V 11 and found it tricky, unpleasant and directionally unstable in a dive. Platz lengthened the rear fuselage by one structural bay and added a triangular fin in front of the rudder. Richthofen tested the modified V 11 and praised it as the best aircraft of the competition. It offered excellent performance from the outdated Mercedes engine, yet was safe and easy to fly. Richthofen's recommendation virtually decided the competition, but he was not alone in recommending it. Fokker immediately received a provisional order for 400 production aircraft, which were named D.VII by Idflieg.

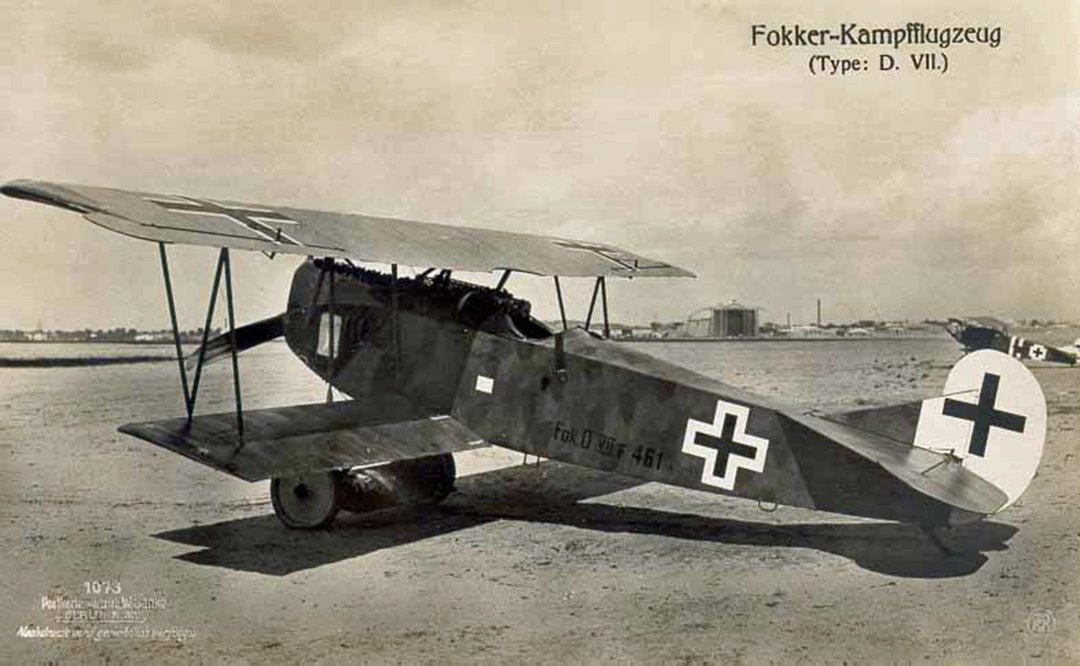
Fokker D.VII (F)

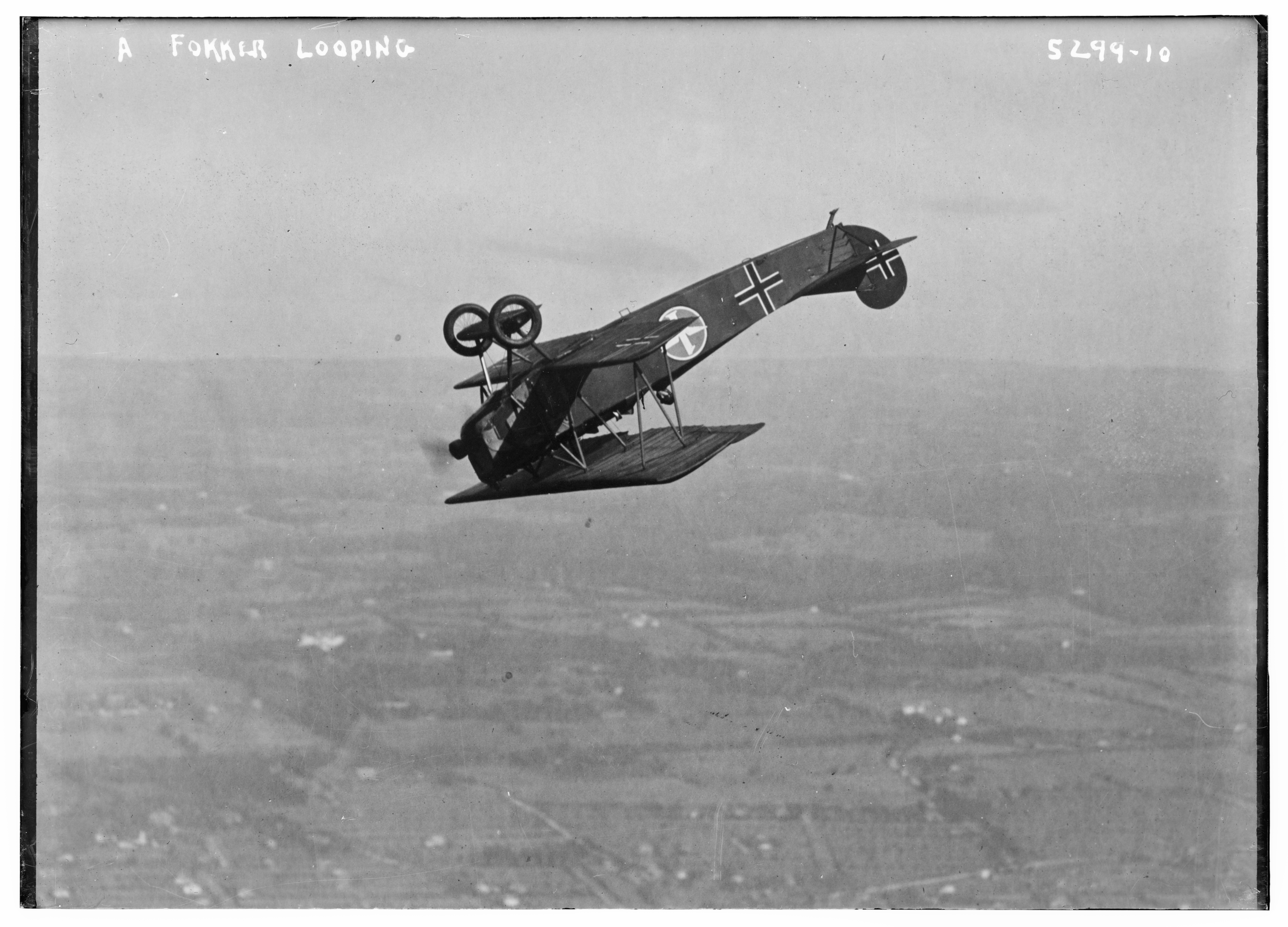
Fokker D.VII looping

Fokker's factory was not up to the task of meeting all D.VII production orders and Idflieg directed Albatros and AEG to build the D.VII under license, though AEG did not ultimately produce any aircraft. Because the Fokker factory did not use detailed plans as part of its production process, Fokker simply sent a D.VII airframe for Albatros to copy. Albatros paid Fokker a five percent royalty for every D.VII it built under license. Albatros Flugzeugwerke and its subsidiary, Ostdeutsche Albatros Werke (OAW), built the D.VII at factories in Johannisthal [Fokker D.VII (Alb)] and Schneidemühl [Fokker D.VII (OAW)] respectively. Aircraft markings included the type designation and factory suffix, immediately before the individual serial number.

Some parts were not interchangeable between aircraft produced at different factories, even between Albatros and OAW. Each manufacturer tended to differ in both nose paint styles and the patterning and layout of their engine compartment cooling louvers on the sides of the nose. OAW produced examples were delivered with distinctive mauve-and-green splotches on the cowling. All D.VIIs were produced with either the five-color Fünffarbiger or less often, the four-color Vierfarbiger lozenge camouflage covering, except for early Fokker-produced D.VIIs, which had a streaked green fuselage. Factory camouflage finishes were often overpainted with colorful paint schemes or insignia for the Jasta or for a pilot.

In September 1918, eight D.VIIs were delivered to Bulgaria. Late in 1918, the Austro-Hungarian company Magyar Általános Gépgyár (MÁG, Hungarian General Machine Company) commenced licensed production of the D.VII with Austro-Daimler engines. Production continued after the end of the war, with as many as 50 aircraft completed.

=== Powerplants ===
The earliest production D.VIIs were equipped with 120 kW (170–180 hp) Mercedes D.IIIa. Production quickly switched to the intended standard engine, the higher-compression 134 kW (180–200 hp) Mercedes D.IIIaü. Some early production D.VIIs delivered with the Mercedes D.IIIa were later re-engined with the D.IIIaü.

By mid-1918, some D.VIIs received the "overcompressed" 138 kW (185 hp) BMW IIIa, the first product of the BMW firm. The BMW IIIa followed the SOHC, straight-six configuration of the Mercedes D.III but incorporated several improvements. Increased displacement, higher compression and an altitude-adjusting carburettor produced a marked increase in speed and climb rate at high altitude. Because the BMW IIIa was overcompressed, using full throttle at altitudes below 2,000 m (6,600 ft) risked premature detonation in the cylinders and damage to the engine. At low altitudes, full throttle could produce up to 179 kW (240 hp) for a short time. Fokker-built aircraft with the new BMW engine were called D.VII(F), the suffix "F" standing for Max Friz, the engine designer.

BMW-engined aircraft entered service with Jasta 11 in late June 1918. Pilots clamored for the D.VII(F), of which about 750 were built. Production of the BMW IIIa was limited and the D.VII continued to be produced with the 134 kW (180 hp) Mercedes D.IIIaü until the end of the war.

D.VIIs flew with different propeller designs from different manufacturers. Despite the variations there is no indication these propellers gave disparate performance. Axial, Wolff, Wotan, and Heine propellers have been noted.

== Operational history ==
=== World War I ===
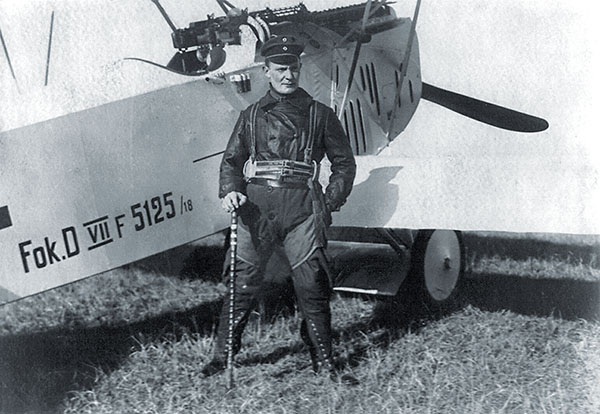
Hermann Göring, commander of Jagdgeschwader 1, beside his Fokker D.VII 5125/18. He holds a walking stick previously owned by Manfred von Richthofen.

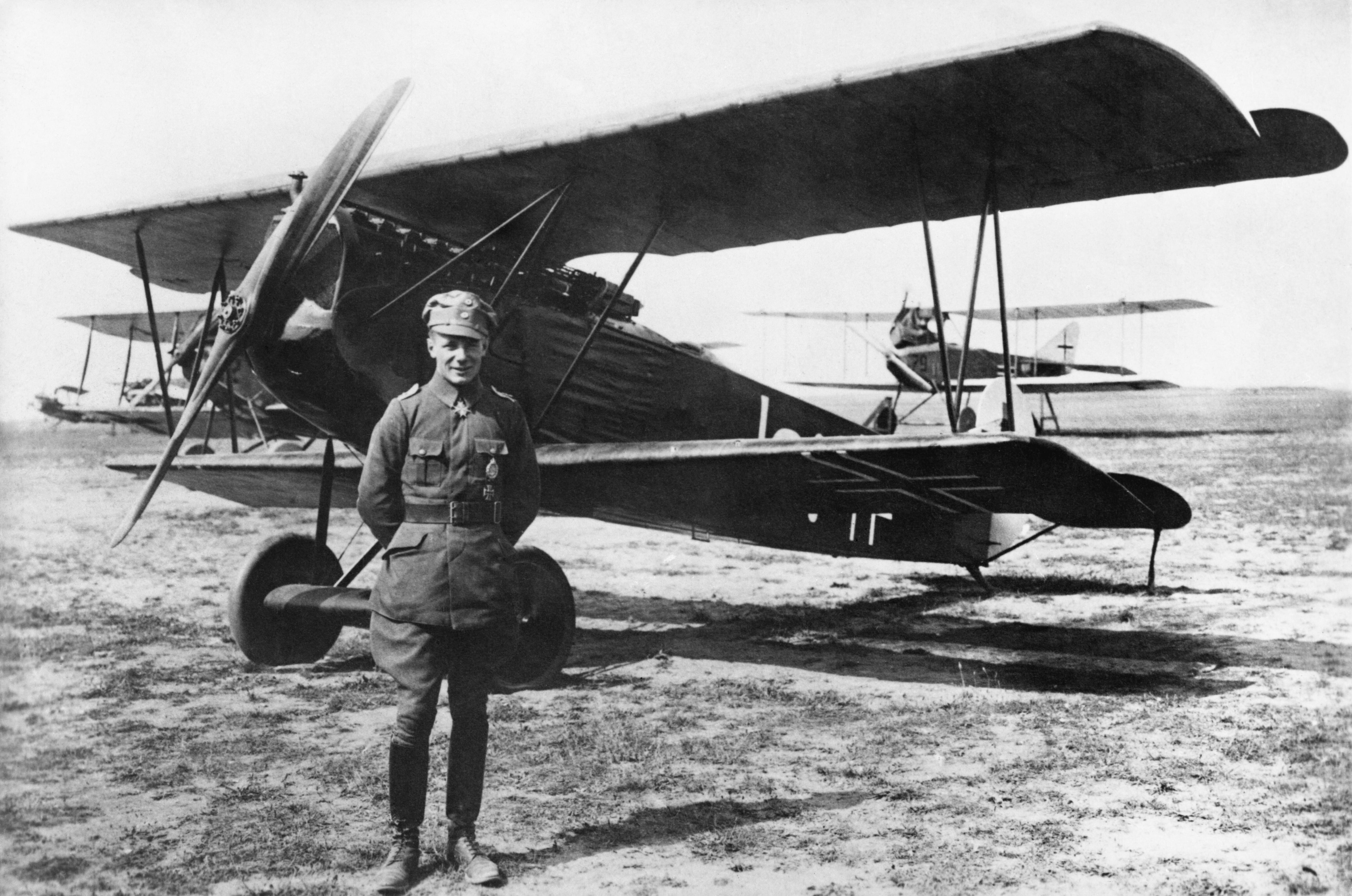
Ernst Udet beside his D.VII, nicknamed "Lo"

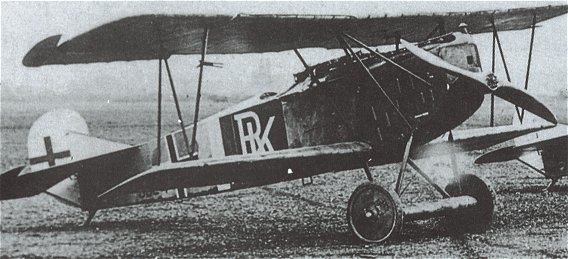
Fokker D.VII of Jasta 66

When the Fokker D.VII entered squadron service with Jasta 10 in early May 1918, Allied pilots at first underestimated the new fighter because of its squarish, ungainly appearance. However, their experiences in combat quickly forced them to revise their view. The type quickly proved to have many important advantages over the Albatros and Pfalz scouts. Unlike the Albatros scouts, the D.VII could dive without any fear of structural failure. The D.VII was also noted for its high manoeuvrability and ability to climb, its remarkably docile stall and reluctance to spin. It could "hang on its prop" without stalling for brief periods of time, spraying enemy aircraft from below with machine gun fire. These handling characteristics contrasted with contemporary scouts such as the Camel and SPAD, which stalled sharply and spun vigorously.

Several aircraft suffered rib failures and fabric shedding on the upper wing. Heat from the engine sometimes ignited phosphorus ammunition until additional cooling louvers were installed on the metal sides of the engine cowling panels and fuel tanks sometimes broke at the seams. Aircraft built by the Fokker factory at Schwerin were noted for their lower standard of workmanship and materials. Despite faults, the D.VII proved to be a remarkably successful design, leading to the familiar aphorism that it could turn a mediocre pilot into a good one and a good pilot into an ace.

Richthofen died days before the D.VII began to reach the Jagdstaffeln and never flew it in combat. Other pilots, including Erich Löwenhardt and Hermann Göring, quickly racked up victories and generally lauded the design. Aircraft availability was limited at first, but by July there were 407 in service. Larger numbers became available by August, by which point D.VIIs had achieved 565 victories. The D.VII eventually equipped 46 Jagdstaffeln. When the war ended in November, 775 D.VII aircraft were in service.

=== Post-war service ===
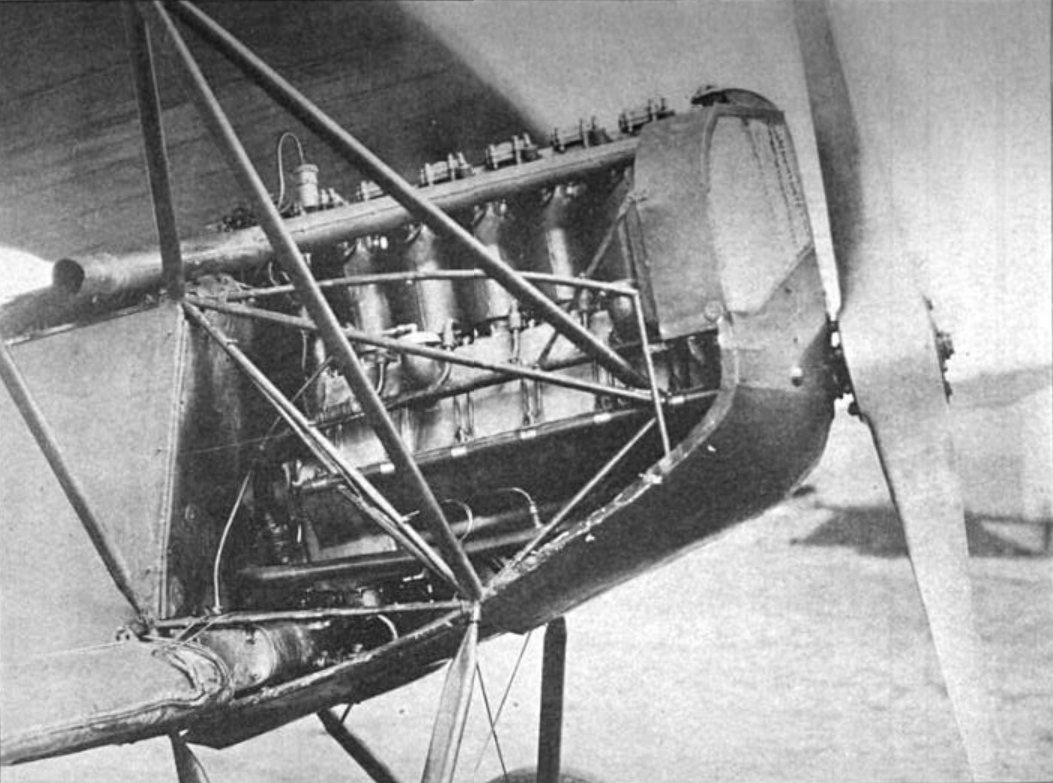
Captured D.VII with an American Liberty L-6 engine installed for testing

The Allies confiscated large numbers of D.VII aircraft after the Armistice. The United States Army and Navy evaluated 142 captured examples. Several of these aircraft were re-engined with American-built Liberty L-6 motors, very similar in appearance to the D.VII's original German power plants. France, Great Britain and Canada also received numbers of war prizes.

Other countries used the D.VII operationally. The Polish deployed approximately 50 aircraft during the Polish–Soviet War, using them mainly for ground-attack missions. The Hungarian Soviet Republic used a number of D.VIIs, both built by MAG and ex-German aircraft in the Hungarian–Romanian War of 1919.

The Dutch, Swiss, and Belgian air forces also operated the D.VII. The aircraft proved so popular that Anthony Fokker completed and sold a large number of D.VII airframes that he had smuggled into the Netherlands by rail after the Armistice. As late as 1929, the Alfred Comte company manufactured eight new D.VII airframes under license for the Swiss Fliegertruppe.

== Variants ==
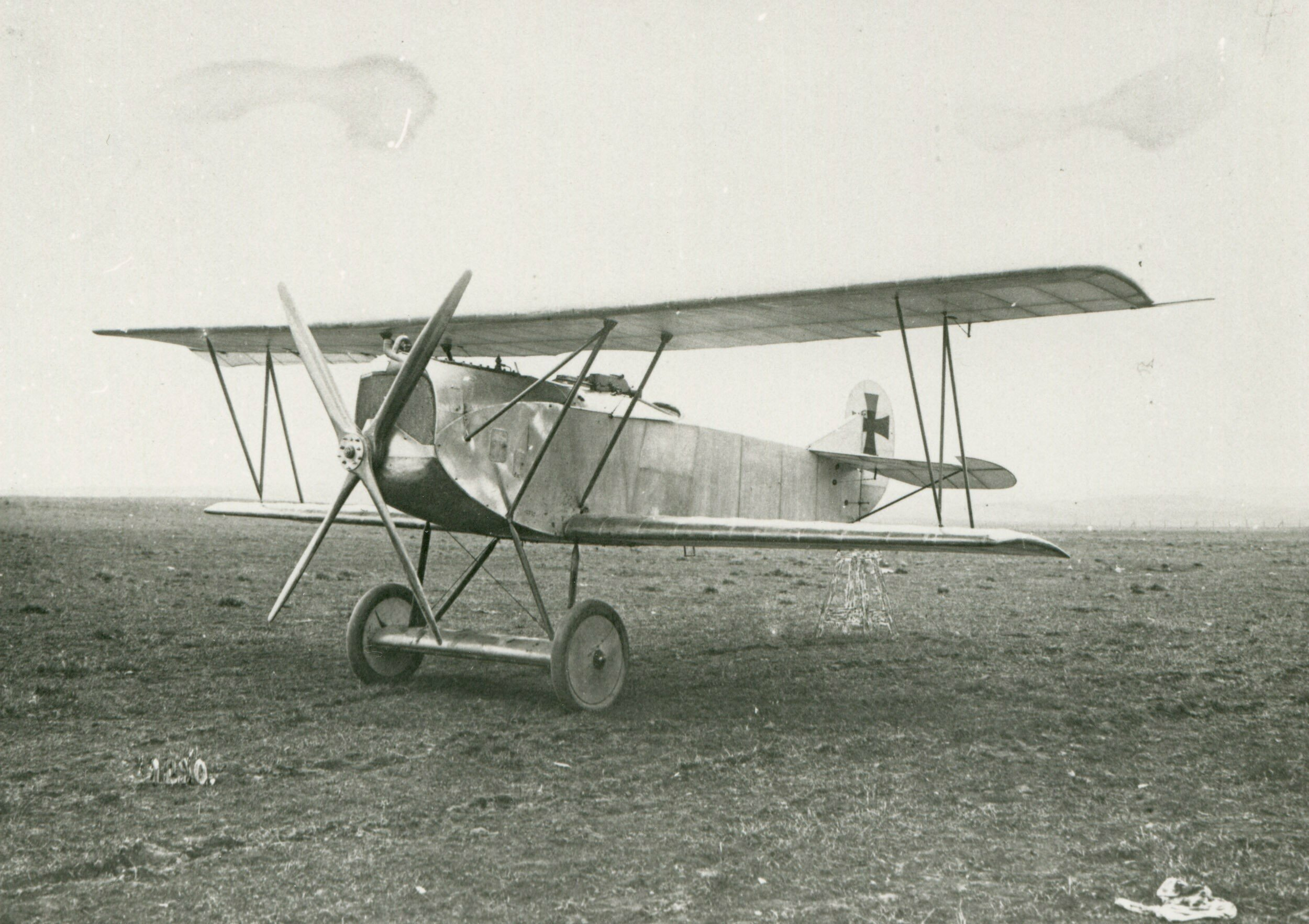
V.22

Fokker V 11
Prototype
Fokker V 21
Prototype with tapered wings
Fokker V 22
Prototype with four-bladed propeller
Fokker V 24
Prototype with 240 hp (180 kW) Benz Bz.IVü engine
Fokker V 31
One D.VII aircraft fitted with a hook to tow the Fokker V 30 glider
Fokker V 34
D.VII development with 185 hp (138 kW) BMW IIIa engine

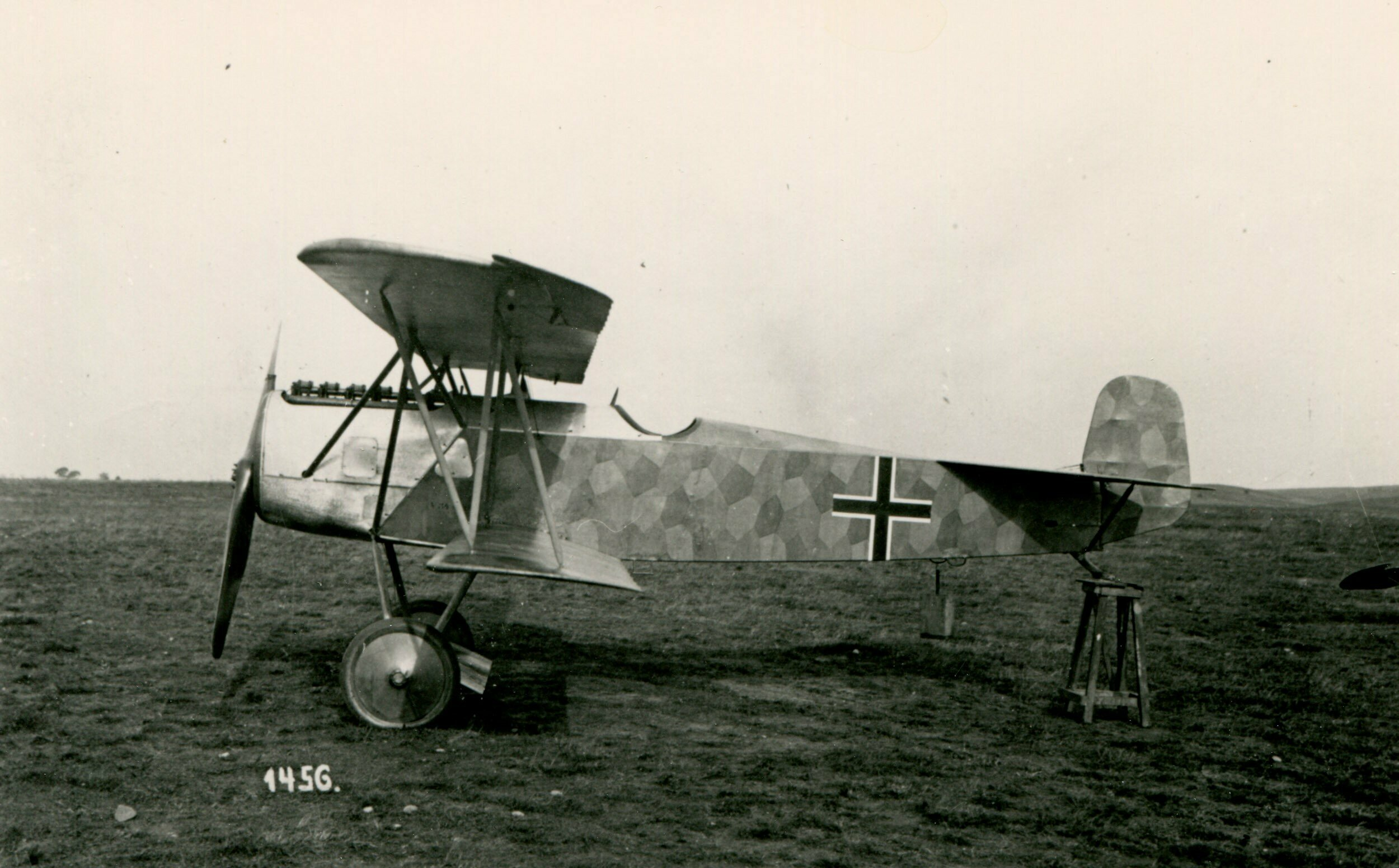
The post-war Fokker V.34 prototype with BMW IIIa engine

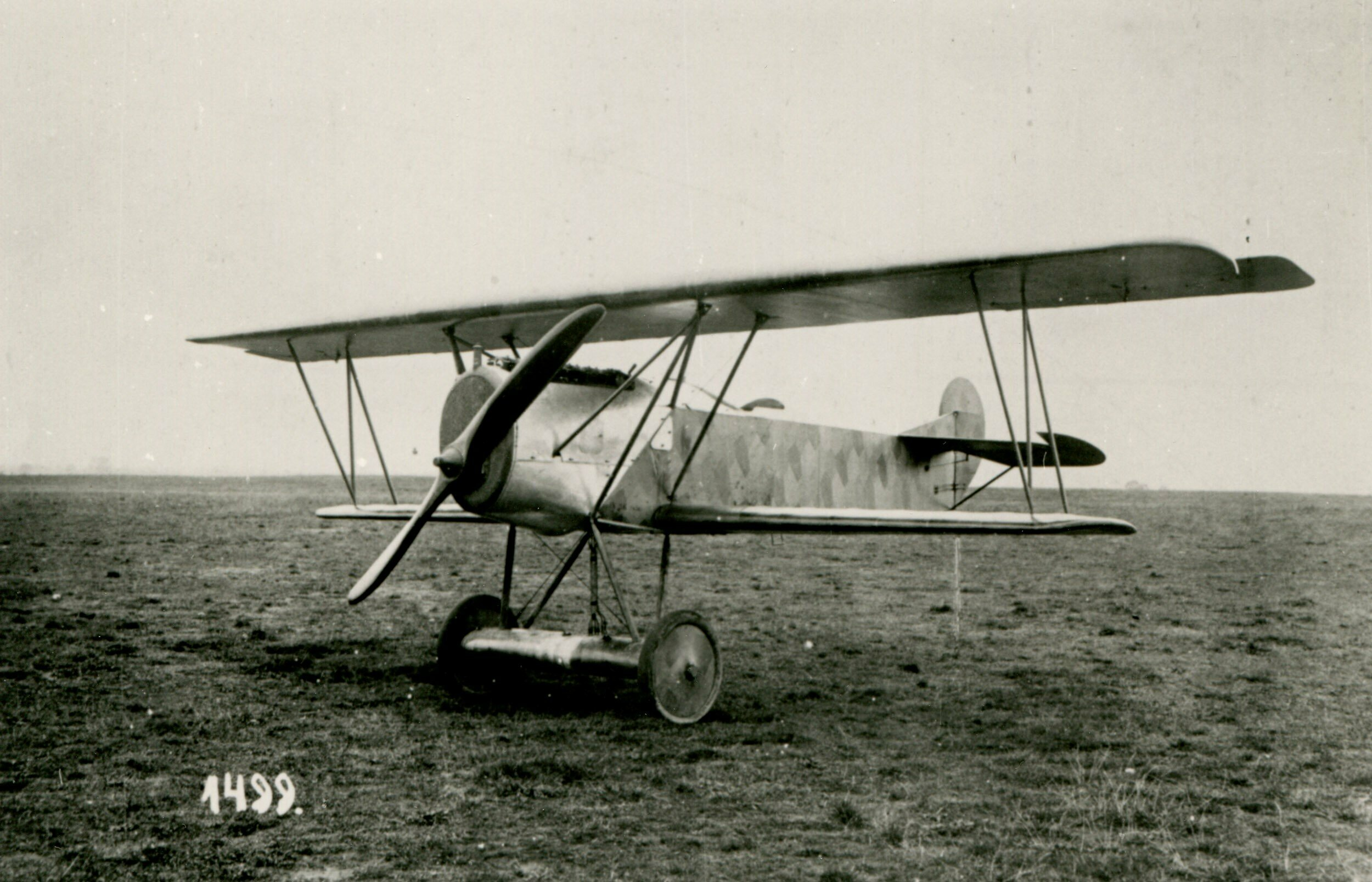
V.36

Fokker V 35
Two-seat development with 185 hp (138 kW) BMW IIIa engine and undercarriage fuel tank
Fokker V 36
D.VII development with 185 hp (138 kW) BMW IIIa engine and undercarriage fuel tank
Fokker V 38
Prototype Fokker C.I
D.VII
Production aircraft from Fokker; either from their wartime Schwerin/Görries headquarters, or post-Armistice, in the Netherlands.
D.VII(Alb)
Production aircraft from Albatros Flugzeugwerke in Johannisthal, Berlin
D.VII(MAG)
Production by Magyar Altalános Gepgyár RT – (MAG) at Mátyásföld, near Budapest
D.VII(OAW)
Production aircraft from Ostdeutsche Albatros Werke in Schneidemühl.
MAG-Fokker 90.05
The Fokker V 22 powered by a 200 hp (150 kW) Austro-Daimler 200hp 6-cyl.
Fokker D.VII Lithuanian versions
One D.VII powered by Siddeley Puma, produced in 1928; 2 D.VII, powered by Mercedes D.III, produced in 1930. Both types featured larger engine cowling and radiator under the nose.

== Operators ==
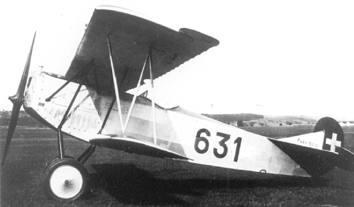
Interned Fokker D.VII in Swiss markings

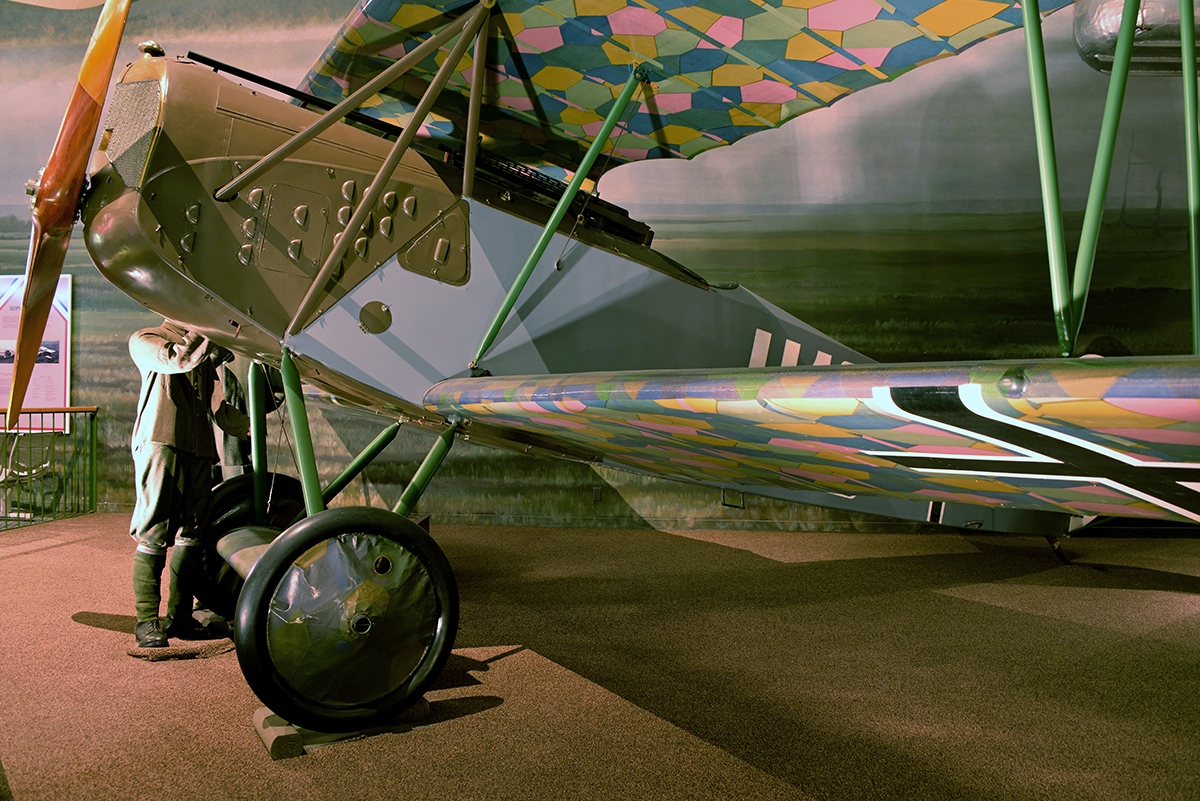
Fokker D.VII "U.10" of Jasta 65 on display at the National Air and Space Museum, Washington, D.C.

- Argentina: Argentine Naval Aviation (one ex-French captured aircraft post-war)
- Austria-Hungary: Austro-Hungarian Navy
- Belgium
- Belgian Air Force
  - 9 Squadron (post-war)
- Kingdom of Bulgaria: Bulgarian Air Force
- Czechoslovakia: (post-war)
- Denmark: Royal Danish Air Force (post-war) – operated a single D.VII from 1922 to 1927.
- Finland: Finnish Air Force (post-war)
- Free City of Danzig: Police air squadron (post-war)
- German Empire
- Luftstreitkräfte
- Kaiserliche Marine
- Hungarian Soviet Republic: Hungarian Red Air Force (post-war)
- Kingdom of Hungary: Royal Hungarian Air Force (post-war)
- Netherlands: Netherlands Naval Aviation Service (post-war) – operated 20 D.VIIs from 1920 to 1937.
- Latvia: Latvian Air Force (post-war)
- Lithuania: Lithuanian Air Force (post-war)
- Poland: Polish Air Force (post-war)
- Kingdom of Romania: Royal Romanian Air Force (post-war)
- Soviet Union: Soviet Air Force (post-war) – purchased 50 D.VIIs from Fokker in 1920.
- Sweden: Swedish Air Force (post-war) – operated a single D.VII from 1920.
- Switzerland: Swiss Air Force
- Ottoman Empire: Ottoman Air Force
- Ukrainian People's Republic: Ukrainian People's Republic Air Fleet (post-war)
- United States:
  - United States Army Air Service (post-war)
  - United States Marine Corps (post-war)

== Surviving aircraft ==
=== Canada ===
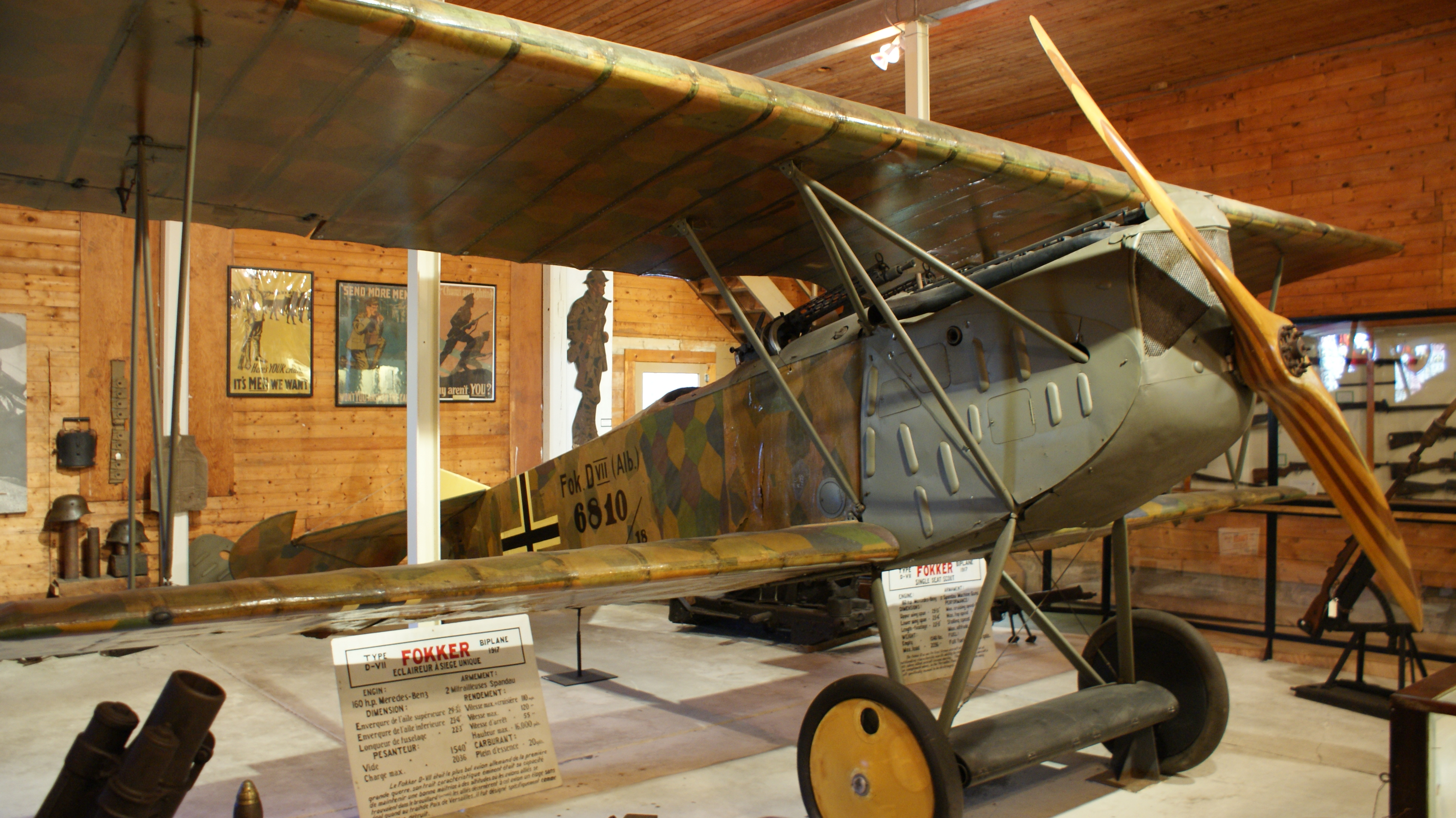
The Lac-Brome museum example, IdFlieg s/n D.6810/18

Of the 22 D.VII aircraft acquired by Canada, one is displayed in the Martin Annex at the Lac-Brome Museum, in the village of Knowlton in Lac-Brome, Quebec. This unrestored Albatros-built example, serial number D.6810/18, is the only surviving D.VII that retains its original, Vierfarbiger four-color lozenge camouflage fabric covering, and is the original source of documentation for the four-color variant of the pre-printed covering.

=== France ===
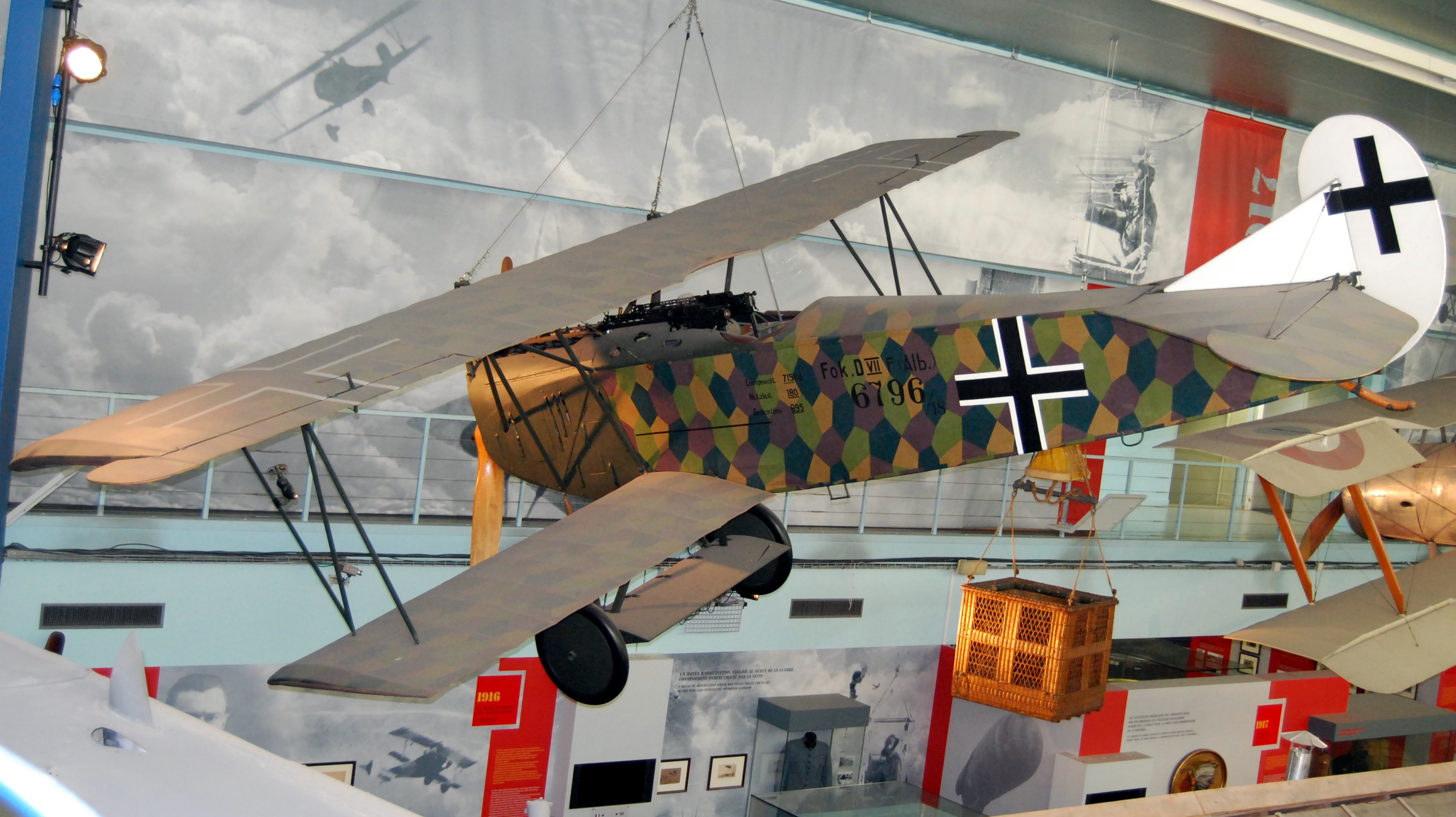
Fokker D.VII, 6796/18 Musee de l'Air

One example of the aircraft sent to France is at the Musée de l'Air et de l'Espace in Paris, France.

=== Germany ===
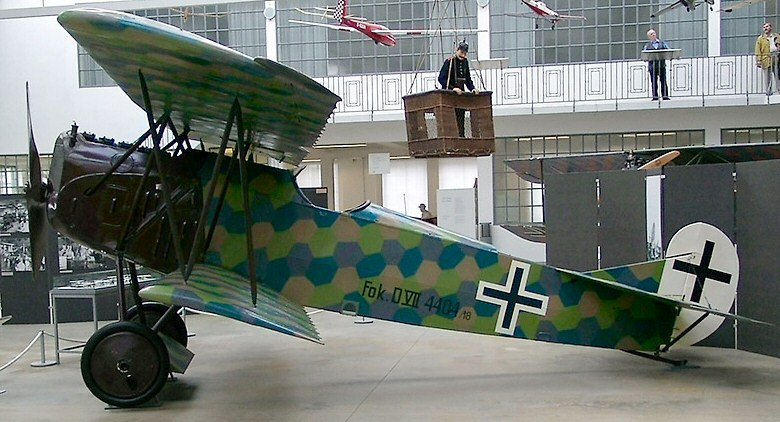
Fokker D.VII preserved at the Deutsches Museum in Oberschleißheim

A former Marine Luchtvaartdienst D.VII MLD 28 was discovered in a German barn in 1948. This aircraft is now displayed at the Deutsches Museum in Munich, Germany.

=== Switzerland ===
The Swiss Air Force bought several German Fokker D.VII in 1920 and built them under license until 1925. One is on display in the Flieger-Flab-Museum in Dübendorf.

=== United Kingdom ===
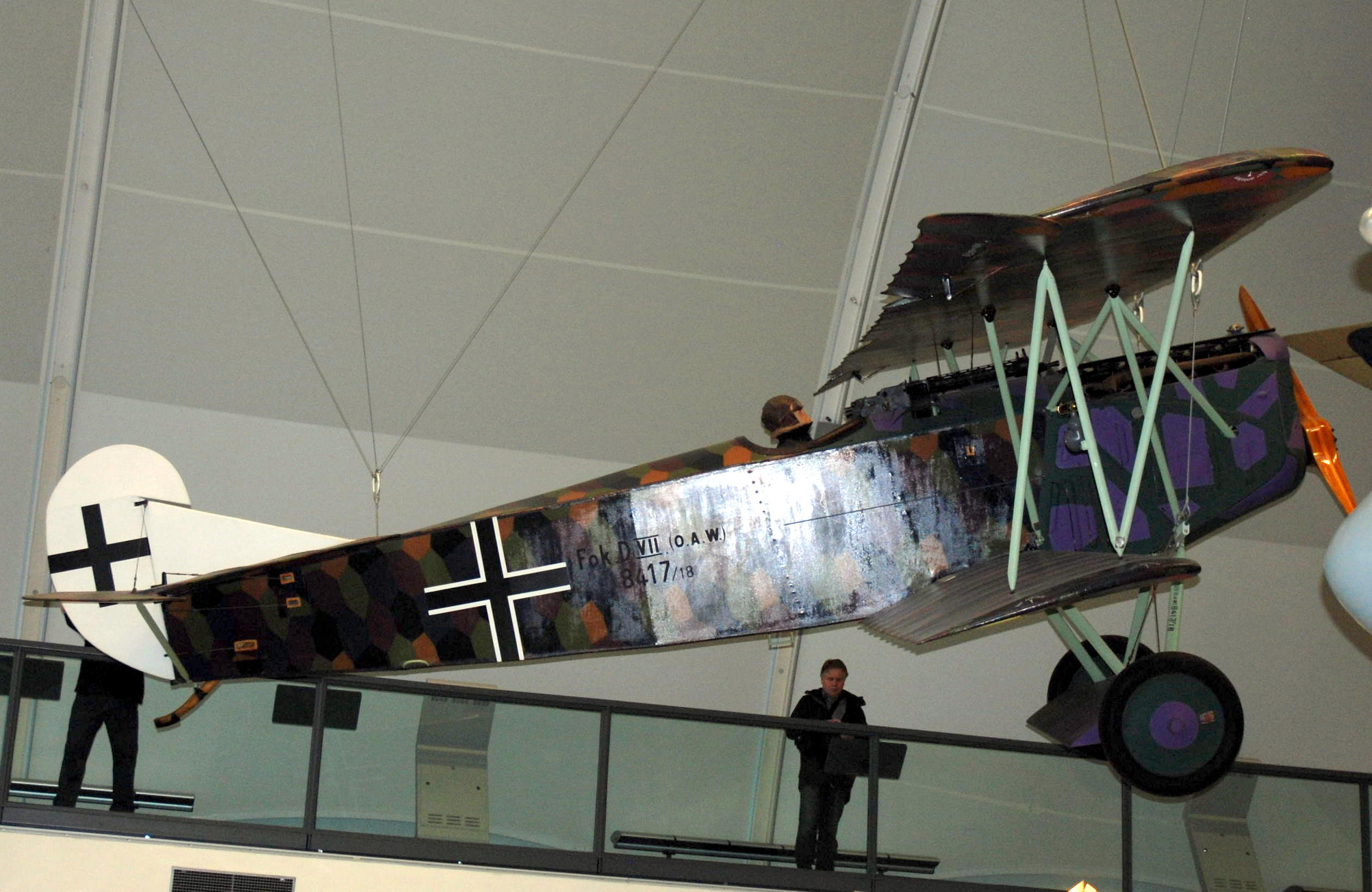
Fokker 8417/18 RAF Museum

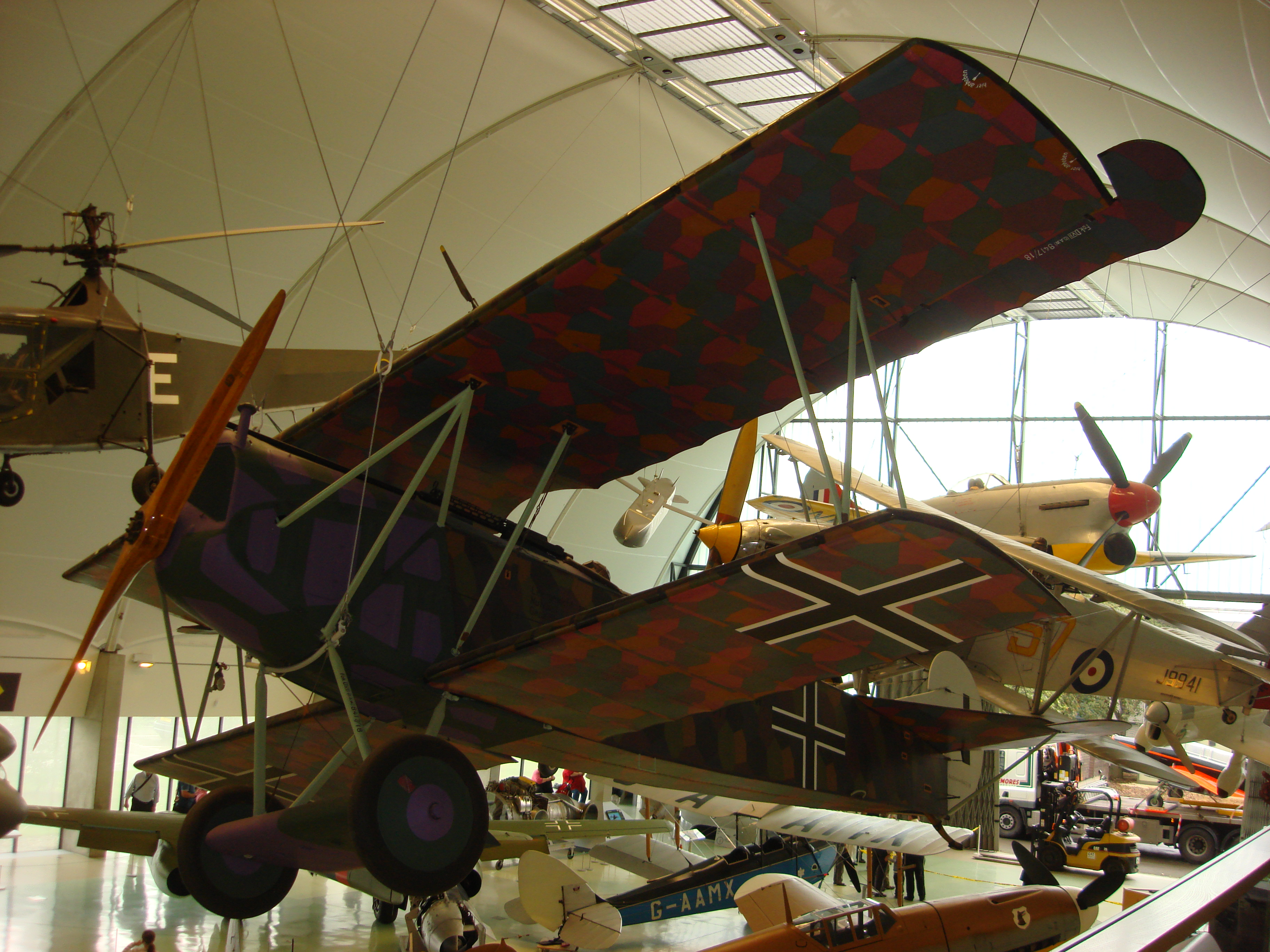
Fokker D.VII displayed at the Royal Air Force Museum

The example preserved in the Royal Air Force Museum in London has an uncertain early history. It was abandoned in Belgium by retreating German forces in 1918 and is likely to be one of the aircraft that served post-war in the Belgian Air Force. It was one of three that were sold and registered to Belgian civilian owners. In 1938, it was shipped to the United Kingdom and added to the aircraft collection of Richard Nash. Under the subsequent ownership of the Royal Aeronautical Society, it was displayed at various collections and exhibitions after World War 2 before being acquired by the RAF Museum in 1992.

=== United States ===
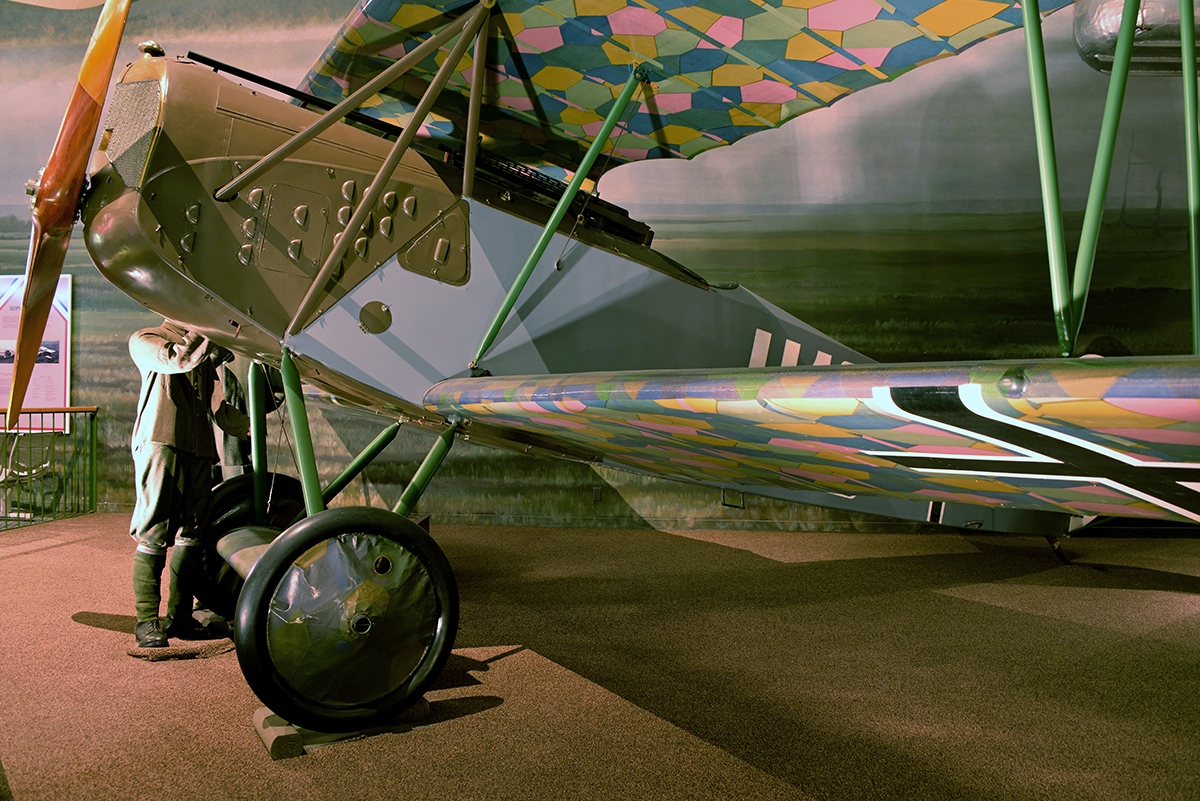
'U.10' of Jasta 65 on display at the National Air and Space Museum, Washington, D.C.

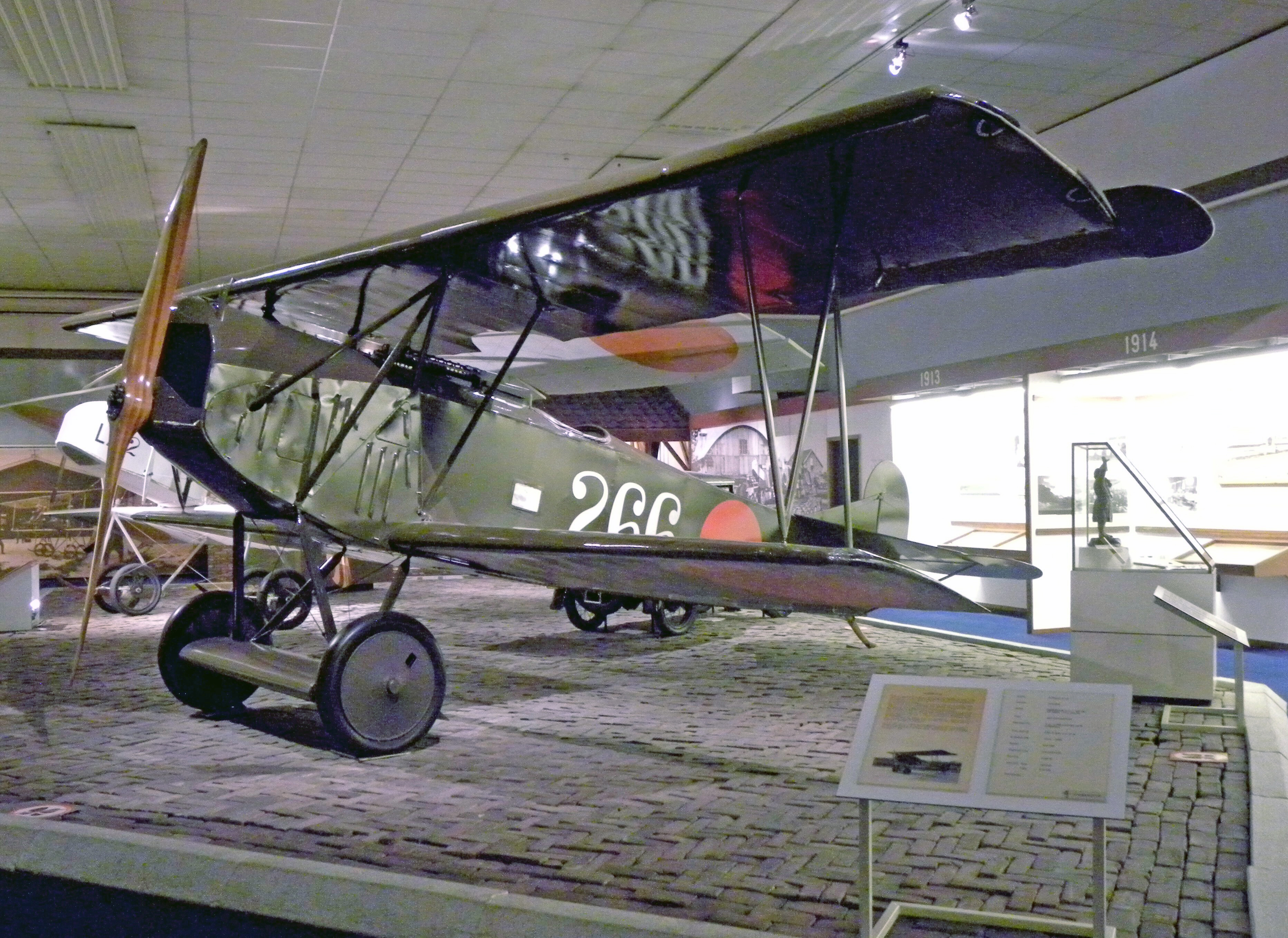
Fokker DVII 2523 aka 266 at Militaire Luchtvaart Museum

One war prize was captured on November 9, 1918 when Leutnant Heinz Freiherr von Beaulieu-Marconnay of Jasta 65 landed at a small American airstrip being used by the 95th Aero Squadron near Verdun, France. It was donated to the Smithsonian Institution by the War Department in 1920, and is now displayed at the National Air and Space Museum in Washington, D.C.

Two other American war prizes were retained by private owners until sold abroad in 1971 and 1981. The former is now displayed at the Canada Aviation Museum, in Ottawa, Ontario. The latter aircraft has been painted in Royal Netherlands Air Force markings, and is on display in Militaire Luchtvaart Museum in Soesterberg, Netherlands.

== Reproductions ==
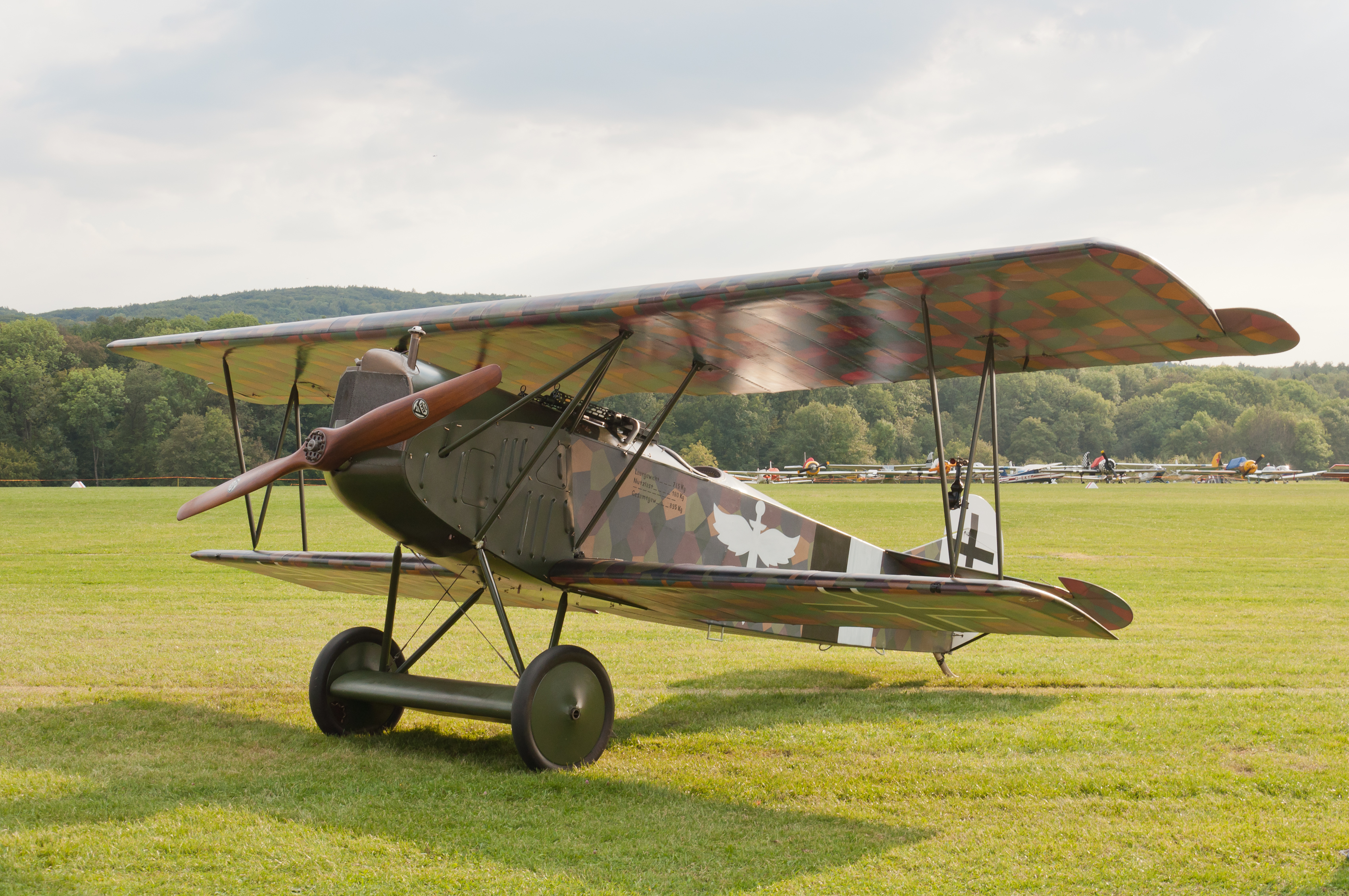
Airworthy Fokker D.VII reproduction incorporating an original engine and parts

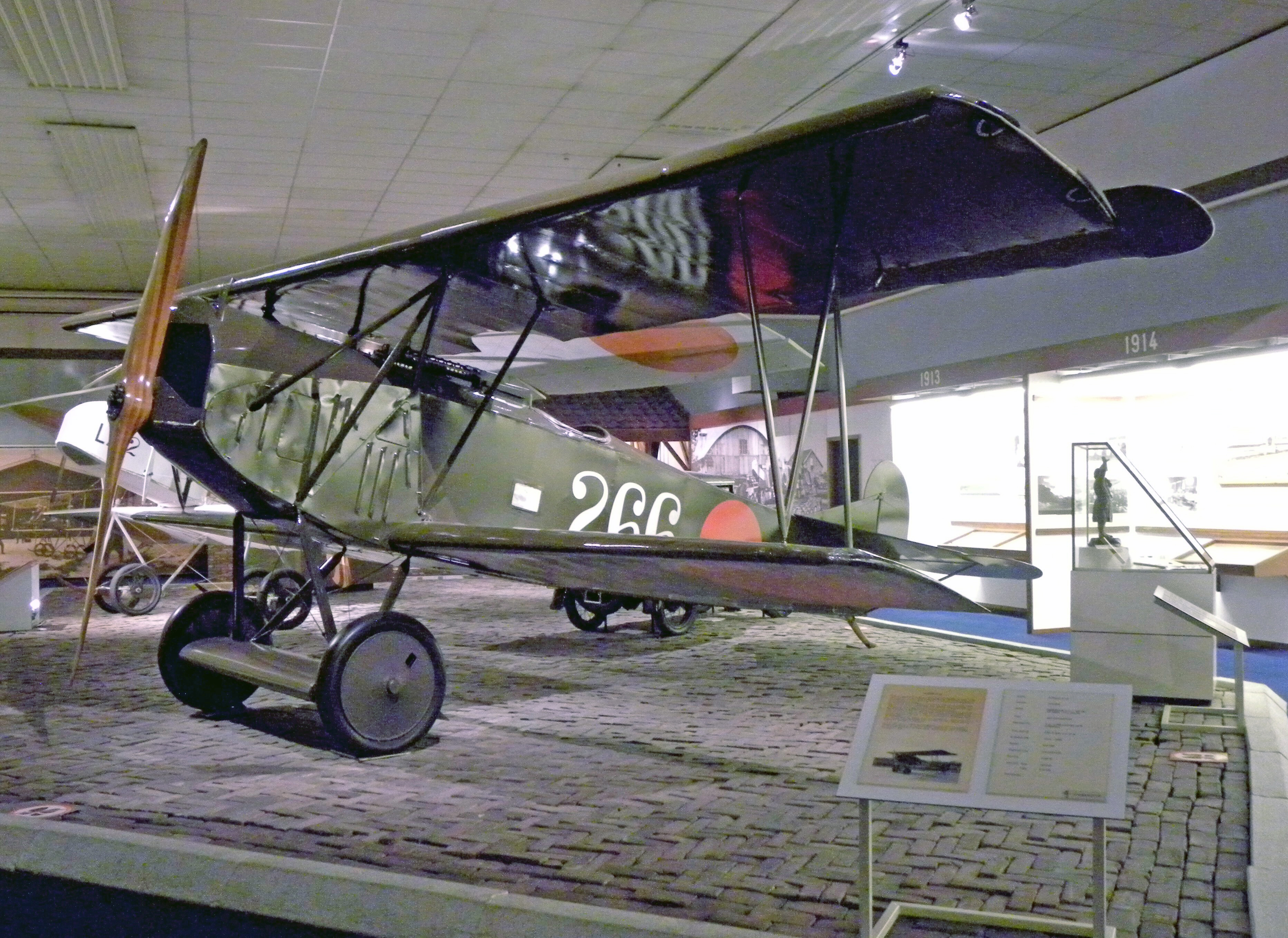
Preserved D.VII on display at the Militaire Luchtvaart Museum in Soesterberg, Netherlands

Many modern D.VII reproductions have been built. Most flyable examples are powered by 7.2-litre (440 in^{3}) American Ranger, or 9.2-litre (560 in^{3}) displacement British Gipsy Queen inverted six-cylinder inline engines, both of which are substantially smaller in displacement than either the Mercedes or BMW engines that powered wartime D.VIIs. A few flying reproductions, such as the one at New York State's Old Rhinebeck Aerodrome, are equipped with original Mercedes D.IIIa engines.

== Specifications (D.VII with Mercedes D.III engine) ==
Data from

General characteristics

- Crew: 1
- Length: 6.954 m (22 ft 10 in)
- Wingspan: 8.9 m (29 ft 2 in)
- Height: 2.75 m (9 ft 0 in)
- Wing area: 20.5 m^{2} (221 sq ft)
- Empty weight: 670 kg (1,477 lb)
- Gross weight: 906 kg (1,997 lb)
- Powerplant: 1 × Mercedes D.III 6-cyl. water-cooled in-line piston engine, 120 kW (160 hp) ::::or 1 × 130 kW (170 hp) Mercedes D.IIIa 6-cyl. water-cooled in-line piston engine

or 1 × 138 kW (185 hp) BMW IIIa 6-cyl. water-cooled in-line piston engine, 175 kW (235 hp) (85 octane fuel, rating at low level, emergency only, risk of engine damage.)

- Propellers: 2-bladed fixed-pitch propeller

Performance

- Maximum speed: 189 km/h (117 mph, 102 kn) ::::with BMW IIIa engine – 200 km/h (120 mph; 110 kn)
- Range: 266 km (165 mi, 144 nmi)
- Service ceiling: 6,000 m (20,000 ft)
- Rate of climb: 3.92 m/s (772 ft/min) ::::with BMW IIIa engine – 9.52 metres per second (1,874 ft/min)
- Time to altitude:

1,000 m (3,300 ft) in 4 minutes 15 seconds (1 minutes 40 seconds w/ BMW IIIa)
2,000 m (6,600 ft) in 8 minutes 18 seconds (4 minutes 5 seconds w/ BMW IIIa)
3,000 m (9,800 ft) in 13 minutes 49 seconds (7 minutes 0 seconds w/ BMW IIIa)
4,000 m (13,000 ft) in 22 minutes 48 seconds (10 minutes 15 seconds w/ BMW IIIa)
5,000 m (16,000 ft) in 38 minutes 5 seconds (14 minutes 0 seconds w/ BMW IIIa)
6,000 m (20,000 ft) (18 minutes 45 seconds w/ BMW IIIa)

- Wing loading: 43.0 kg/m^{2} (8.8 lb/sq ft)

Armament

- Guns: 2 × 7.92 mm (0.312 in) LMG 08/15 "Spandau" machine guns

== See also ==
Related development

- Fokker C.I

Aircraft of comparable role, configuration, and era

- Ansaldo A.1 Balilla
- Martinsyde Buzzard
- Pfalz D.XII
- Royal Aircraft Factory S.E.5
- Sopwith Snipe
- SPAD 13

== Bibliography ==
- Anderson, Lennart (November–December 2019). "La renaissance de l'aviation militair bulgare dans les années vingt" [The Rebirth of Bulgarian Military Aviation in the Twenties]. Avions (in French) (232): 52–66. ISSN 1243-8650.
- Gray, Peter & Thetford, Owen (1987) [1970]. German Aircraft of the First World War (2nd ed.). London: Putnam. ISBN 0-85177-809-7.
- Herris, Jack & Leckscheid, Jörn (2023). Fokker Aircraft of WWI: Volume 5: 1918 Designs, Part 1 - Prototypes & D.VI: A Centennial Perspective on Great War Airplanes. Great War Aviation Centennial Series. Vol. 55A. n.p.: Aeronaut Books. ISBN 978-1-953201-09-6.
- Herris, Jack & Leckscheid, Jörn (2023). Fokker Aircraft of WWI: Volume 5: 1918 Designs, Part 2 - D.VII & D.VIII: A Centennial Perspective on Great War Airplanes. Great War Aviation Centennial Series. Vol. 55B. n.p.: Aeronaut Books. ISBN 978-1-953201-61-4.
- Imrie, Alex (1971). Pictorial History Of The German Army Air Service 1914 - 1918. Shepperton, Surrey: Ian Allan Limited.
- Imrie, Alex (1978). German Fighter Units June 1917 - 1918. London: Osprey Publishing Limited. ISBN 0-85045-289-9.
- Imrie, Alex (1986). Fokker Fighters Of World War One. London: Arms and Armour Press. ISBN 0-85368-782-X.
- Imrie, Alex (1987). German Air Aces Of World War One. London: Arms and Armour Press. ISBN 0-85368-792-7.
- Klaauw, Bart van der (March–April 1999). "Unexpected Windfalls: Accidentally or Deliberately, More than 100 Aircraft 'arrived' in Dutch Territory During the Great War". Air Enthusiast (80): 54–59. ISSN 0143-5450.
- Nelcarz, Bartolomiej & Peczkowski, Robert (2001). White Eagles: The Aircraft, Men and Operations of the Polish Air Force 1918–1939. Ottringham, UK: Hikoki Publications. ISBN 1-902109-73-2.
- Owers, Colin (November–December 1995). ""Especially... The D.VII...": The post-1918 career of the Fokker D.VII: Part One". Air Enthusiast. No. 60. pp. 63–70. ISSN 0143-5450.
- Owers, Colin (January–February 1996). ""Especially... The D.VII...": The post-1918 career of the Fokker D.VII: Part Two". Air Enthusiast. No. 61. pp. 52–63. ISSN 0143-5450.
- "Round-Out". Air Enthusiast (65): 77–78. September–October 1999. ISSN 0143-5450.
- Swanborough, Gordon; Bowers, Peter M. (1971). United States military aircraft since 1908. Putnam. ISBN 0370000943.
- Weyl, A.R. (1988). Fokker : the Creative Years. London: Putnam. ISBN 0-85177-817-8.
