= Jagdstaffel 65 =

Jasta 65
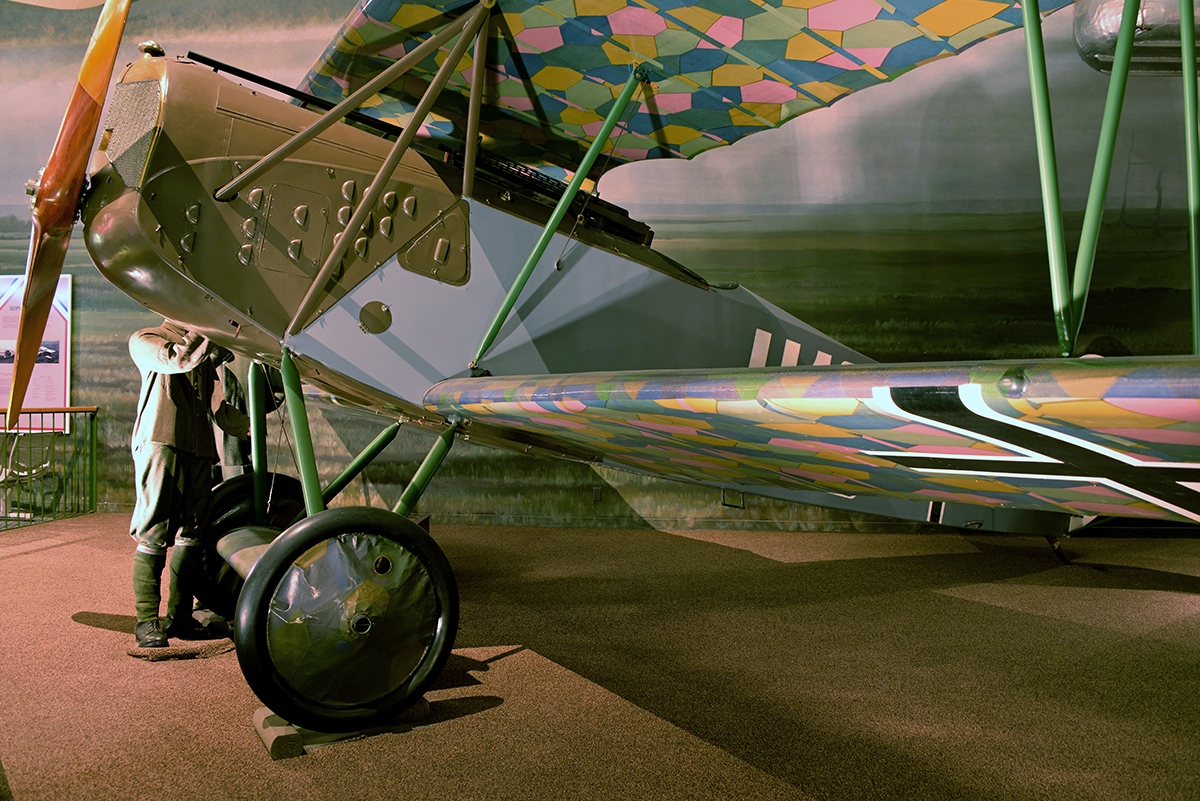
- Fokker D.VII "U.10" of Jasta 65 on display at the National Air and Space Museum, Washington, D.C.
- Active: 1918
- Country: Kingdom of Prussia, German Empire
- Branch: Luftstreitkräfte
- Type: Fighter squadron
- Engagements: World War I

Royal Prussian Jagdstaffel 65, commonly abbreviated to Jasta 65, was a "hunting group" (i.e., fighter squadron) of the Luftstreitkräfte, the air arm of the Imperial German Army during World War I. The squadron would score 34 aerial victories during the war, including nine observation balloons downed. The unit's victories came at the expense of six pilots killed in action, two wounded in action, and two taken prisoner of war.

== History ==
Jasta 65 was founded on 23 January 1918. On 4 February it began operations. The new squadron began service with 5 Armee. On 6 May 1918, it was posted to Armee-Abteilung C. It would finish the war with this army.

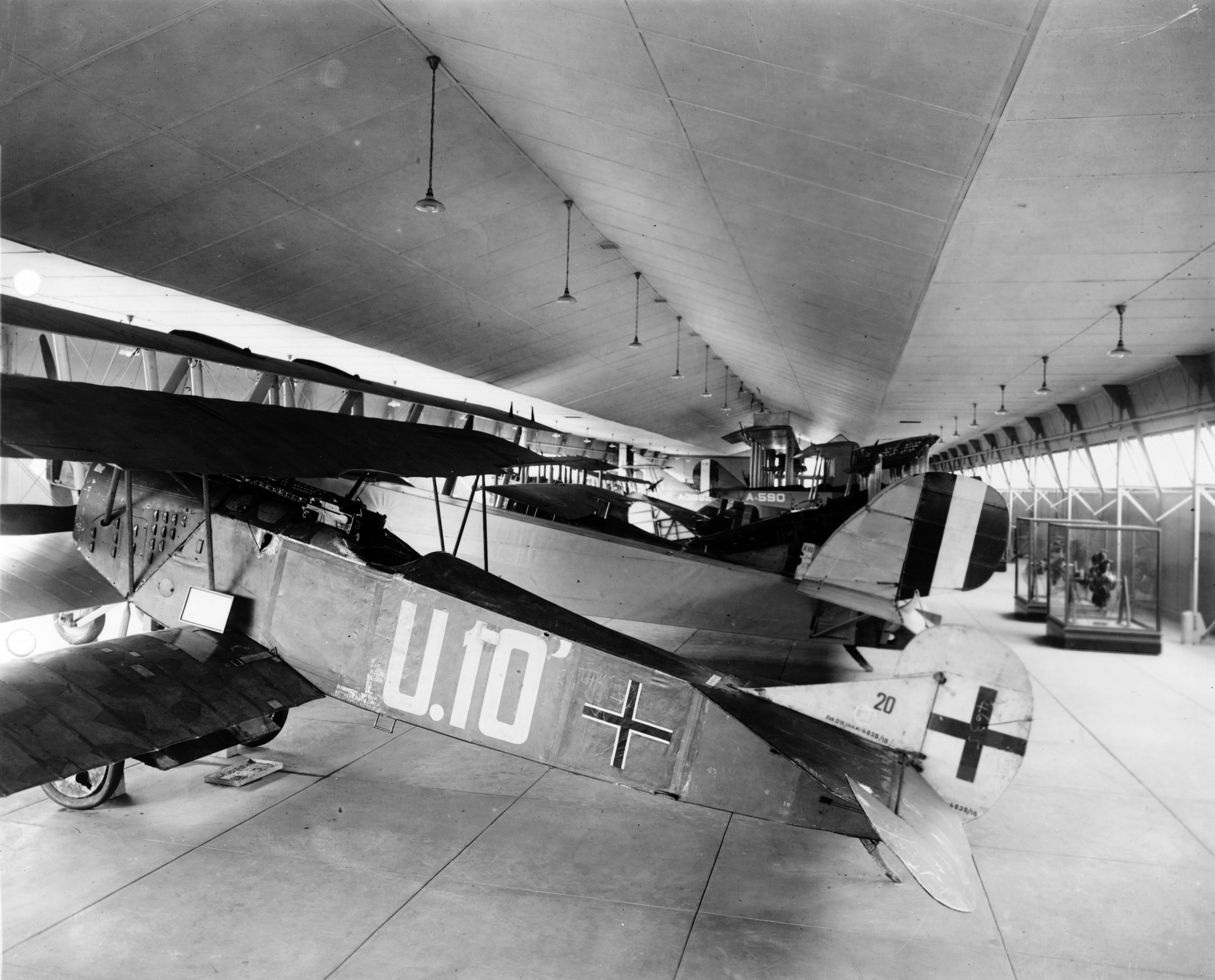
Biplane aircraft on display in the United States of America following the First World War, probably at the Smithsonian Institution. The first aircraft is a (formerly) German Fokker D.VII fighter, s/n 4635/18, built by the "Ostdeutsche Albatros Werke (O.A.W.)". Note the inscription on the fuselage next to the wing root: "1st Pursuit Group, 95th Aero Squadron, Capt. J. Mitchell commanding." Note this is "U 10" seen above

== Commanding officers (Staffelführer) ==
- Hellmuth Contag: ca 23 January 1918 - 6 March 1918 (KIA)
- Arno Benzler: 6 March 1918 - 19 March 1918
- Otto Fitzner: 19 March 1918 - war's end

== Duty stations ==
- Stenay, France
- Mars-la-Tour, France: 6 May 1918
- Prentin: 15 July 1918
- Las Baraques: 18 July 1918
- Marville, France: 16 September 1918
- La Ferte, France: 6 October 1918
- Tichémont: 20 October 1918
