= Karl Bolle (flying ace) =

German fighter ace

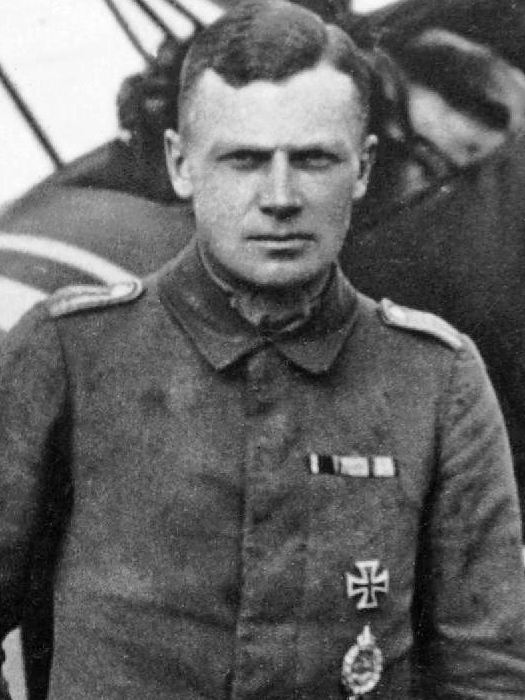
- Karl Bolle, prior to winning the Pour le Merite
- Born: 20 June 1893; Berlin, Germany
- Died: 9 October 1955 (aged 62); Berlin, Germany
- Military career
- Allegiance: Germany
- Branch: Cavalry, Air Service
- Service years: 1913–1918
- Rank: Rittmeister
- Units: 7th von Seyditz Kurassier Regiment; Kampfgeschwader der Oberste Heeresleitung IV; Kampstaffel 23; Jagdstaffel 28; Jagdstaffel 2
- Commands: Jagdstaffel 2
- Awards: Pour le Mérite; Royal House Order of Hohenzollern; Military Merit Cross; Friedrich Order; Iron Cross
- Other work: Helped covertly train pilots for secret founding of Luftwaffe.

Rittmeister Carl Bolle (also as Karl Bolle) (20 June 1893 – 9 October 1955) was a German fighter ace with 36 aerial victories during World War I and a recipient of the Order Pour le Mérite, Prussia's highest award for bravery. He became a Jagdstaffel commander during that war, and an advisor to the Luftwaffe during World War II.

== Life before flying ==
Karl Bolle was born in Berlin on 20 June 1893, to a family owning a well-known dairy. He studied economics at The University of Oxford in 1912, and was also well known for his athletic prowess, playing ice hockey while there.

He returned home to Germany to enlist as a leutnant (lieutenant) in the 7th (Magdeburg) Cuirassiers "von Seydlitz" Regiment in 1913 as a one-year volunteer. At the start of World War I his regiment served on the Western Front, fighting in Belgium and the First Battle of the Marne. It was then transferred to the Eastern Front; Bolle seeing action in Poland and in Courland in Latvia. By the end of 1915, Bolle had won an award for bravery, the Iron Cross, Second Class and transferred to the Luftstreitkräfte.

== Aerial service in World War I ==
He undertook his initial training at Johannistal, then was forwarded to Fliegerersatz-Abteilung 5 in Hannover, Germany. Later he trained to become a fighter pilot at Valenciennes, France, at Jastaschule I. The standard German practice was to be trained initially and serve initially in a two-seater unit, in this case Kampfgeschwader der Oberste Heeresleitung IV, and then later transfer for training as a fighter pilot at a Jastaschule where they would be closely tutored by experts with frontline experience. They also had access to captured British and French fighters to familiarize themselves with their opponent's aircraft.

At any rate, upon completion, he was assigned to the bombing group Kampfgeschwader der Oberste Heeresleitung IV in July 1916.

Bolle was wounded in October, 1916 in combat with five French fighters. He crash landed within friendly lines and despite his own injury dragged his injured observer safely out of the shell-fire directed at their downed aircraft.

Upon his recovery, he had been assigned to Kampfstaffel 23 of Kampfgeschwader der Oberste Heeresleitung IV; Lothar von Richthofen was assigned as his observer/gunner. It was about this time that Bolle was awarded the Kingdom of Württemberg's 2nd Class Knight's Cross of the Friedrich Order. He was the only fighter ace to win this award.

Bolle went to Jastaschule (fighter pilot's training) in early 1917. He joined Jagdstaffel 28 in April 1917, while still recuperating from a leg wound. While assigned as a non-flying adjutant, he began tutelage on the fighter pilot's craft with two aces, Karl Emil Schaefer and Otto Hartmann, as well as Bolle's friend, Max Ritter von Müller.

In July he commenced operational flying with Jagdstaffel 28. His first victory was over an Airco DH.4 of No. 57 Squadron RFC on 8 August 1917. He scored once more in August and victories in December 1917 and January 1918 made him an ace by 30 January.

== Bolle in command ==
He was then promoted to Oberleutnant and transferred to command Jagdstaffel 2 on 20 February 1918 at Marcke, France. This was the squadron that Oswald Boelcke had commanded as he invented the first fighter tactics, strategy, and organization. It was being re-equipped with Fokker Dr.I triplanes as it was being incorporated into Jagdgeschwader 3. It was a dispirited squadron, having lost three consecutive Pour le Mérite holding commanding officers killed in action. Bolle was destined to be the final commander of Jagdstaffel 2.

Despite seemingly modest credentials, Bolle set his mark upon the squadron. The Fokker Dr.I triplane supplied was a plane of limited speed but great maneuverability and climb rate. Its slower speed made it more difficult to close to short distance for gunnery against faster fighters. Bolle's solution was the use of an Oigee telescopic sight for his guns. He also painted distinctive white stripes on his upper wings, to denote his leadership role, along with a yellow fuselage band edged by black and white to honor his old cavalry regiment.

Bolle's command of English turned out to be handy upon occasion, when he questioned downed British Empire fliers.

He opened his tally with Jagdstaffel 2 on 25 April 1918, as part of a huge air offensive launched to support ground assault on Kemmel Ridge. He then began a steady collection of single and double victories, with five in May, seven in June, nine in July and three in August. In August, 1918, when he had scored 28 victories, he received the Military Merit Cross, and the Royal House Order of Hohenzollern; the Pour le Mérite (commonly known as the Blue Max) was bestowed on the 28th.

Bolle did not score again until 1 November. On 4 November, he downed four Allied fighters: two RAF SE.5as of 56 Squadron RAF and two Sopwith Snipes of 4 Squadron, Australian Flying Corps. The Snipes (claimed with Leut.Ernst Bormann) were flown by aces Captain Thomas Baker (12 victories) and Lt. A. J. Palliser (7). These were Bolle's final victories.

A week later, he and his pilots defiantly marked their Fokker D.VIIs with their names and victory scores before surrendering them into British hands at Nivelles, Belgium.

Bolle's final score of 36 victories included a preponderance of wins over enemy fighters; he downed 25. The other 11 victories were two-seater reconnaissance, ground attack, and bomber aircraft. More importantly, he led Jagdstaffel 2 through the intense battles of 1918 to the second highest victory total in the German Air Force, with a total of 336 victories to the Jasta.

== Post World War I ==
After war's end, he became a flying instructor. He also became the Director of the Deutsche Verkehrsfliegerschule (German Air Transport School) in the 1920s. Subsequently, he helped in the covert training of pilots for the Luftwaffe.

During World War II, he served as an advisor with the Luftwaffe, reporting to Hermann Göring.

Karl Bolle died in his native city of Berlin on 9 October 1955.

== Honors and awards ==
- Kingdom of Prussia: Order Pour le Mérite (28 August 1918)
- Kingdom of Prussia: Royal House Order of Hohenzollern, Knight's Cross with Swords (August 1918)
- Kingdom of Prussia: Iron Cross, First Class
- Kingdom of Prussia: Iron Cross, Second Class (1915)
- Grand Duchy of Mecklenburg-Schwerin: Military Merit Cross, Second Class (August 1918)
- Kingdom of Württemberg: Friedrich Order, Knight's Cross Second Class with Swords
