= Ernst Hess =

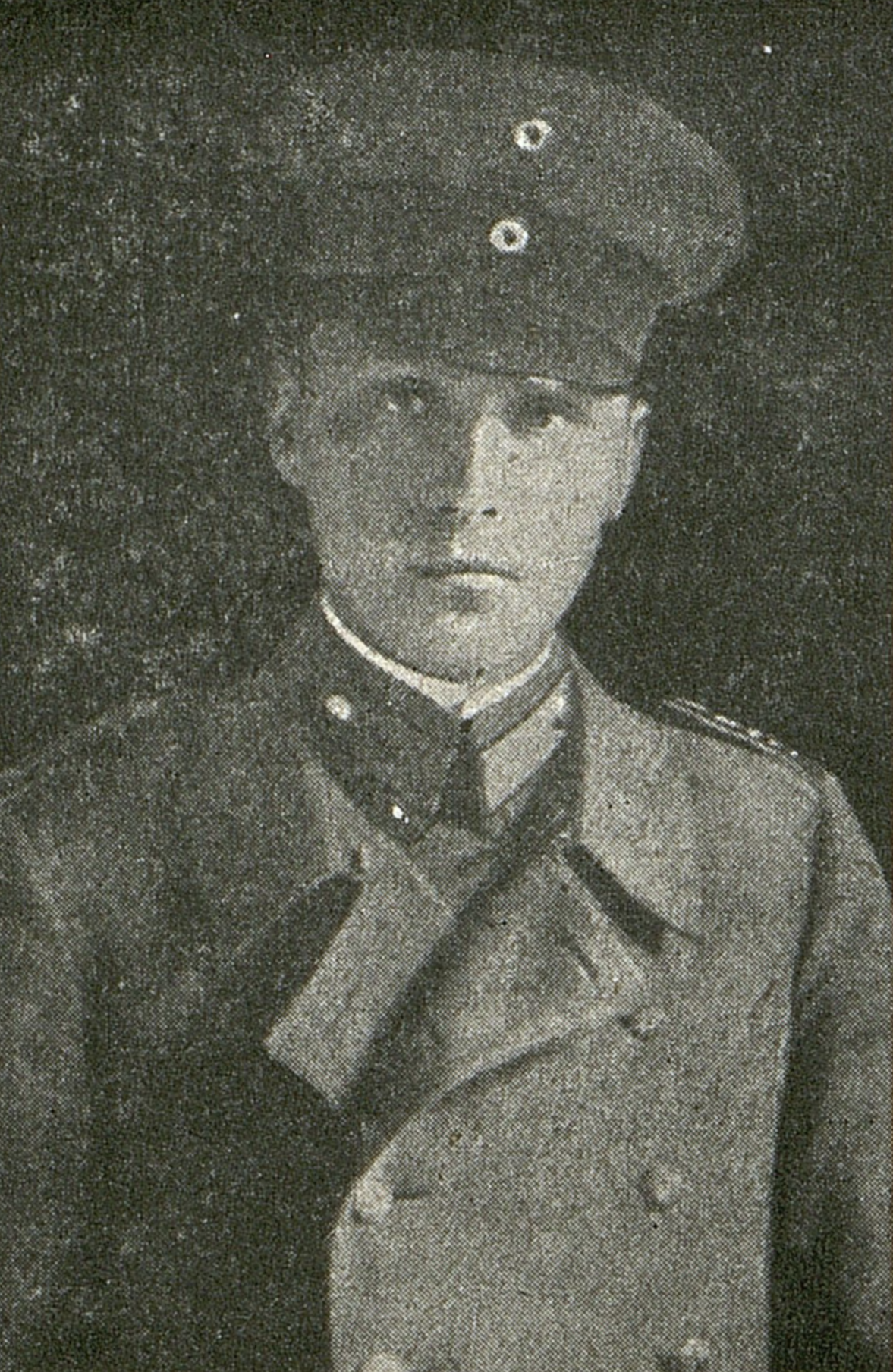
- Born: 8 January 1893; Wiesbaden, Germany
- Died: 23 December 1917 (aged 24); East of Fresnes
- Burial place: Weisbaden, Germany
- Military career
- Allegiance: German Empire
- Branch: Aviation
- Rank: Leutnant
- Units: Luftschiffer (Airship) Battalion Nr. 3; Flieger-Abteilung (Flier Detachment) 9; Flieger-Abteilung (Flier Detachment) 62; Jagdstaffel 10 (Fighter Squadron 10); Kampfeinsitzerkommando Douai (Combat Single-Seater Command Douai); Fokkerstaffel C (Fokker Flight C); Fokkerstaffel Sivry (Fokker Flight Sivry); Jagdstaffel 28 (Fighter Squadron 28);
- Commands: Jagdstaffel 19 (Fighter Squadron 19)
- Awards: House Order of Hohenzollern; Iron Cross First and Second Classes

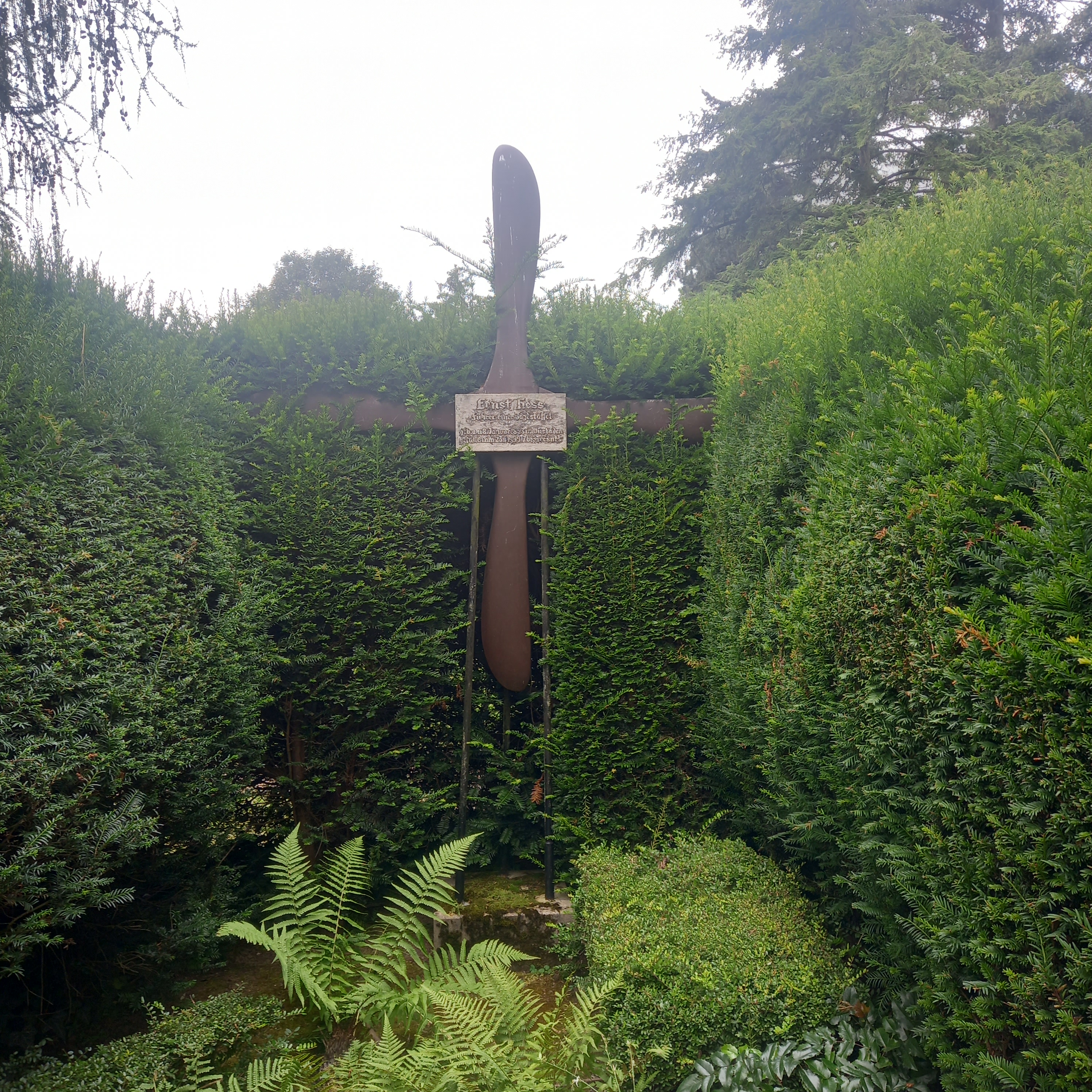
Grave of Ernst Hess at South Cemetery Wiesbaden

Leutnant Ernst Hess HOH IC was a World War I flying ace credited with 17 confirmed and four unconfirmed aerial victories. Hess was one of a few World War I pilots involved in aviation prewar, as he gained his civil pilot's license on 26 September 1913. He was already enrolled in Die Fliegertruppen (The Flying Troops) of the Imperial German Army when World War I began. He qualified for his military pilot's license on 21 November 1914, and was launched on his flying career as one of Germany's first fighter pilots. He would score his first aerial victory in tandem with Oswald Boelcke on 5 January 1916. He would rotate through four assignments before scoring a dozen victories within July–September 1917 while flying an Albatros D.Va for Jagdstaffel 28. On 19 September 1917, he was promoted to command of Jagdstaffel 19. He had just been appointed to command of a Jagdgruppe (fighter group) being formed by Germany's First Army when he was killed in combat on 23 December 1917.

== Biography ==
Ernst Hess was born on 8 January 1893 in Wiesbaden in the German Empire. His education led him into engineering, and he became interested in flying. He trained as a pilot, receiving Pilot's License 535 on 26 September 1913. On 1 October 1913, he joined Luftschiffer Battalion Nr. 3. On 1 April 1914, he was forwarded to Feldflieger Abteilung (Field Flier Detachment) 3 to train as a military pilot. World War I began even as he trained.

On 21 November 1914, he earned his military pilot's badge. He then joined Flieger-Abteilung (Flier Detachment) 9 as an Unteroffizier, when they were operating in the vicinities of Lille and Arras, France. On 24 June 1915, he was promoted into the officer's ranks as a Leutnant. He moved to Douai to join Flieger-Abteilung (Flier Detachment) 62, and its co-located ad hoc fighter detachment, Kampfeinsitzerkommando (Combat Single-Seater Command) Douai. Hess joined Oswald Boelcke and Max Immelmann there.

Hess scored a victory for Kampfeinsitzerkommando Douai (Combat Single-Seater Command Douai) on 5 January 1916 in conjunction with Oswald Boelcke, and another for Fokkerstaffel C on 22 June 1916. On 1 July, he transferred yet again, to Fokkerstaffel Sivry. There were other unrecorded reassignments for Hess, then a stint as an original member of one of the first real German fighter squadrons, Jagdstaffel 10, before he was assigned to instructor duty back in Germany.

However, Ernst Hess did not hit his stride until assigned to Royal Württemberg Jagdstaffel 28 on 12 June 1917. In July, August, and September 1917, he reeled off a dozen confirmed wins for them, with three others going unconfirmed. Hess shot down an Airco DH.4 from No. 55 Squadron RFC, killing the crew of Lt A. P. Matheson with Second Lieutenant Frank Lambton Oliver, west of Audenarde/Oodenaarde on 13 July 1917. Another of his confirmed victories, on 9 August 1917, was over Australian ace Cecil Roy Richards.

Hess then transferred to Royal Prussian Jagdstaffel 19 as their Staffelführer and won three victories for them flying an Albatros D.Va before being killed in action by Adjutant De Kergolay of Escadrille N.96 in a Nieuport on 23 December 1917. Hess had just been notified of his further promotion to command of a jagdgruppe (fighter group) being formed by First Army. Ernst Hess was buried in the Südfriedhof (Southern Cemetery) in his native Wiesbaden.

== Awards and honors ==
- Iron Cross both Second Class and First Class: Awarded prior to October 1917.
- Royal House Order of Hohenzollern: Awarded 5 December 1917.
