= Otto Hartmann =

Otto Hartmann may refer to:

- Otto Hartmann (aviator) (1889–1917), World War I flying ace
- Otto Hartmann (general) (1884–1952), German general in the Wehrmacht
- Otto Hartmann (actor) (1904–1994), Austrian stage and film actor
