= Thomas Lewis (RAF officer) =

British World War I flying ace

Thomas Archibald Mitford Stuart Lewis
- Born: 26 June 1894; Wilby, Northamptonshire, England
- Died: 21 June 1961 (aged 66)
- Military career
- Allegiance: United Kingdom
- Branch: British Army; Royal Air Force
- Service years: 1916–1919; 1941–1942
- Rank: Lieutenant
- Units: Royal West Kent Regiment; No. 20 Squadron RFC
- Conflicts: World War I • Western Front; World War II
- Awards: Military Cross
- Other work: Returned to service during World War II

Lieutenant Thomas Archibald Mitford Stuart Lewis MC (26 June 1894 – 21 June 1961) was a British World War I flying ace credited with six aerial victories.

== World War I ==
Lewis was commissioned from cadet to temporary second lieutenant (on probation) in the Royal West Kent Regiment on 5 August 1916. On 15 May 1917 he was transferred to the General List to serve in the Royal Flying Corps as a flying officer (observer), with seniority from 8 April.

Lewis was posted to No. 20 Squadron RFC, flying the F.E.2d two-seater fighter. He gained his first aerial victory on 29 April 1917, by destroying an Albatros D.III over Kortrijk–Ypres, piloted by Second Lieutenant E. J. Smart. For his next two victories he flew with Captain Hugh G. White, driving down another D.III over Zandvoorde on 23 May, and an Albatros D.V over Comines–Quesnoy on the 26th. On 5 June, piloted by Lieutenant Harold L. Satchell, Lewis shot down an Albatros D.V over Becelaère–Zandvoorde. The pilot, Karl Emil Schäfer, commander of Jagdstaffel 28, was killed. On the afternoon of 27 July, with pilot Second Lieutenant G. T. Burkett, Lewis destroyed two more Albatros D.Vs over Menen, but was severely wounded by an incendiary bullet. His leg was later amputated.

On 26 September 1917 Lewis was awarded the Military Cross as a result of this action. His citation, published on 10 January 1918, read:

Temporary 2nd Lieutenant Thomas Archibald Mitford Stuart Lewis, General List and Royal Flying Corps.

"For conspicuous gallantry and devotion to duty. Whilst acting as Observer his patrol engaged a superior force of enemy scouts. His Pilot was wounded, but they continued to fight, destroying one enemy machine. He was then severely wounded, but continued to work his gun lying on his back. By this means they were able to destroy a second enemy machine. Afterwards, when returning to our lines with their machine badly damaged, he and his Pilot drove off two machines which were pursuing them, having displayed the greatest gallantry and presence of mind."

Lewis was promoted to lieutenant on 5 February 1918, but ceased to be an observer on 30 May, serving as an administrative officer. He was reassigned as a lieutenant (grade B) in the RAF's Technical Branch on 3 February 1919.

== Later life ==
Lewis retained his interest in aviation post-war being one of the founders of the Cinque Ports Flying Club, based at Lympne Aerodrome, Kent, in 1928. He returned to military service during World War II, being commissioned as a probationary acting pilot officer "for the duration of hostilities" in the Royal Air Force Volunteer Reserve's Training Branch on 2 February 1941, until resigning his commission on 24 April 1942.

== Bibliography ==
- Norman Franks; Russell Guest; Gregory Alegi. Above the War Fronts: The British Two-seater Bomber Pilot and Observer Aces, the British Two-seater Fighter Observer Aces, and the Belgian, Italian, Austro-Hungarian and Russian Fighter Aces, 1914–1918: Volume 4 of Fighting Airmen of WWI Series: Volume 4 of Air Aces of WWI. Grub Street, 1997. ISBN 1-898697-56-6, ISBN 978-1-898697-56-5.
