= Cecil Roy Richards =

Australian flying ace

- Born: 24 July 1893; Garvoc, Victoria, Australia
- Died: 28 March 1973 (aged 79); Glenelg, South Australia
- Military career
- Allegiance: Australia
- Branch: Aviation
- Rank: Lieutenant
- Unit: No. 20 Squadron RFC
- Awards: Military Cross

Lieutenant Cecil Roy Richards was an Australian flying ace of World War I. He was credited with twelve aerial victories.

== Early life ==
Richards enlisted on 16 March 1915. He served on ground duty in both Gallipoli and France before transferring to the Royal Flying Corps in late 1916.

== Aerial service ==
Details of Richards' training are not recorded. However, he was assigned to No. 20 Squadron RFC as a pilot flying the Royal Aircraft Factory FE.2d. He drove down an Albatros D.V on 14 June 1917 for his first win. He continued to score for the next two months, through 16 August 1917, including four victories on 17 July. His observer/gunner for nine of these victories was John Cowell. Richards' final tally was four enemy airplanes destroyed, eight driven down out of control.

On 19 August 1917, he was shot down and wounded by Ernst Hess of Jagdstaffel 28, and then captured.

== Postwar life ==
On 26 July 1919, Richards was transferred to the unemployed list of the Royal Air Force.

As of 2 April 1948, Richards is referred to in Australian government papers as living at 26 Weewanda Street, Glenelg. He subsequently died in Glenelg on 28 March 1973.

== Honors and awards ==
Military Cross (MC)

2nd Lt. Cecil Roy Richards, R.F.C., Spec. Res.

For conspicuous gallantry and devotion to duty when on offensive patrols in attacking and shooting down hostile machines. On one occasion he shot down four in one day.
