= Max Ritter von Müller =

German flying ace

- Born: 1 January 1887; Rottenburg an der Laaber, Kingdom of Bavaria, German Empire
- Died: 9 January 1918 (aged 31) near Moorslede, Belgium
- Military career
- Allegiance: Germany
- Branch: Infantry, Flying Service
- Service years: 1907–1918
- Rank: Leutnant
- Nickname: Blue Max
- Units: Flieger-Abteilung (Artillerie) 1b; Flieger-Abteilung (Artillerie) 32; Jagdstaffel 2 (twice); Jagdstaffel 28
- Commands: Jagdstaffel 2
- Awards: Prussian Pour le Mérite; House Order of Hohenzollern; Medal for Bravery (Silver and Gold Awards); Iron Cross (First and Second Class); Military Order of Max Joseph; Military Merit Order (Württemberg); Military Merit Order (Bavaria) Fourth Class with Swords

Max Ritter von Müller (birth name Max Müller) (1 January 1887 – 9 January 1918) PlM, IC, MOMJ was a German World War I fighter ace credited with 36 victories. He was the highest scoring Bavarian pilot of the war.

A prewar pilot, Müller broke both legs in an aviation accident soon after World War I broke out. He later earned a reputation as a daring reconnaissance pilot. A medal winning low-level photographic intelligence flight on 13 March 1915 under heavy fire was pivotal in getting him a fighter posting. He was then picked to fly the first dedicated fighter aircraft. As German fighter aviation rapidly evolved throughout the war, Müller would progress as a fighter ace. The diminutive ace who had begun his career in the enlisted ranks became the only German airman to be commissioned into the German regular army on 26 May 1917. Müller's victory toll rose to second among German aces, trailing only Manfred von Richthofen, the Red Baron. After receiving various lower level awards, Müller received the Prussian Blue Max on 3 September 1917. His native Bavaria decided he deserved its equivalent national award, the Military Order of Max Joseph. On 9 January 1918, Müller's Albatros airplane was set on fire by a British reconnaissance plane he was attacking. He fell from the burning craft to his death.

== Early life ==
Max Müller was born on 1 January 1887 in Rottenburg an der Laaber. Physically Müller grew to be small in stature, being only five foot one inch tall.

== Prewar military service ==
As Müller had a natural mechanical aptitude, he had been apprenticed to a locksmith. His first military assignment was chauffeur to the Bavarian War Minister. He importuned the Minister for transfer to the Luftstreitkräfte.

The Minister having been persuaded, Müller was posted to the army flying school at Schleißheim on 1 December 1913, and after four months of training he became a fully qualified pilot on 4 April 1914. He started flying missions immediately.

== World War I ==
=== Reconnaissance duty ===
Müller was assigned to Feldflieger Abteilung 1b on 2 August 1914. When the war broke out, Müller flew several reconnaissance missions. On 18 August 1914 however, a takeoff accident caused by engine failure broke both Müller's legs.

Afterwards, he returned to Feldflieger Abteilung 1b. On 31 March 1915, flying an Otto C.I 'pusher' biplane, he barely survived a hard dogfight against a French-flown Farman. On 13 December 1915, the day he was awarded the Second Class Iron Cross, Müller flew a highly hazardous low-level mission through heavy ground fire behind enemy lines, photographing enemy positions. This daring mission established his reputation as an aggressive pilot and led to his transfer to fighters. Decorated for this flight, he was one of only 16 German soldiers to be awarded the Kingdom of Bavaria's Silver Medal for Bravery.

=== Service in fighters ===
Müller underwent single-seat fighter training and then served with Feldflieger Abteilung 32, beginning on 17 May 1916. As a two-seater pilot, Müller had flown over 160 missions. Already noted as an aggressive and skilled airman, Müller was one of the first pilots to fly the Fokker Eindecker in action.

Müller was posted to Kampfeinsitzer Kommando B, which in May 1916 became Abwehrkommando Nord of Flieger-Abteilung (Artillerie) 32. He then was posted to the newly mobilized Prussian Jagdstaffel 2 on 1 September 1916, to serve under Oswald Boelcke. On 10 October of that same year, he scored his first victory; an Airco DH.2 of No. 24 Squadron RFC, the pilot being captured. On 27 November, Müller became an ace.

A transfer to the Kingdom of Württemberg's newly formed Jagdstaffel 28 followed, on 21 January 1917. On the 30th, he shot down the No. 45 Squadron RFC Sopwith 1 1/2 Strutter of Captain William Wright, who survived; it was Müller's seventh win. While serving with the squadron, he became a mentor to future ace Carl Bolle.

Müller's tally quickly rose throughout 1917, with six more victories in May. He was also promoted from the enlisted ranks to Leutnant on 26 May, in the regular army, rather than the Reserve, the first time such a commission had been awarded.

He was awarded the Württembergian Order of Military Merit on 28 June 1917, and the Member's Cross with Swords of the Royal Hohenzollern House Order. Though the Hohenzollern was customarily an award for officers, the Members' Cross was a class of the order exclusively for non-commissioned officers and was a rare distinction, being awarded only 16 times during the war.

On 28 July, he shot up the Sopwith 1½ Strutter of Captain Matthew Brown Frew and gunner Lieutenant George Al Brooke. The British aircrew managed to crash-land at their home base. It counted as Müller's 19th victory.

August 1917 was Müller's highest scoring month, with eight victories, and he added another in September. A year after Müller had joined Jagdstaffel 2, he had gotten an impressive score of 27 victories and been awarded the Pour le Merite on 3 September 1917. His native Bavaria recognized him with the Golden Medal for Bravery. As it was an enlisted man's medal, he had been nominated for it before he was commissioned an officer. The belated award made him the only airman in the war to win both classes of the medal.

With the many medals that had been awarded to him, he was one of the most highly decorated aces in the entire German air service, second only to Manfred von Richthofen However, by October, Müller was at odds with his commanding officer, Emil Thuy, and desired a change.

With the death of his friend Heinrich Gontermann in late October, Müller was second only to Manfred von Richthofen as the highest scoring ace still at the front. Müller wangled a transfer back to Jagdstaffel 2 on 3 November 1917, rejoining his old friend, commanding officer Erwin Böhme. Müller shot down victim number 30 on 6 November. On 11 November 1917, Müller shot down Captain Arthur Claydon of No. 32 Squadron RFC as his 31st victim. On 29 November 1917, Müller's friend Böhme was killed in action.

Müller shot down four aircraft in December 1917. When the squadron leader's position came vacant, a dissatisfied Müller was passed over for command. Walter von Bülow-Bothkamp was brought in to take command on 13 December. Meanwhile, Müller's native Bavaria had considered giving him the Military Order of Max Joseph, but realized he lacked the required Military Merit Order, 4th Class with Swords. They awarded Müller the latter medal on 18 December as a preliminary to the more prestigious award.

When the Jagdstaffel 2 leader, Walter von Bülow-Bothkamp, was killed on 6 January, Müller temporarily inherited the command of the Jasta.

== Death in action ==
Just three days later, on 9 January 1918, while on a patrol over Moorslede, Müller's flight came across an RE.8 of No. 21 Squadron flown by Capt. G. F. W. Zimmer and Lt. H. A. Somerville, escorted by two SE5a fighters of No. 60 Squadron RFC. A letter by his squadronmate Leutnant von Gudenberg told the tale:

"The Kette (Flight) together attacked an RE two-seater. The observer fired alternately upon everyone and Müller must have received a fatal hit between the first and second button of his tunic. He fell out of the aircraft because he wasn't fastened, and later on his aeroplane was completely burnt. Except for this one hit, no others could be found."

The victory over Müller and his Albatros D.Va was credited to the SE.5a pilots, Captain Robert L. Chidlaw-Roberts and Captain Frank "Mongoose" Soden.

== Aftermath ==
A memorial service was held in Courtrai before his remains were returned to his home town via train for burial.

After the war, in early 1919, Müller was finally approved for the Knight's Cross of the Military Order of Max Joseph, backdated to 11 November 1917. Thus in death, Max Müller became a non-hereditary knight, Max Ritter von Müller.

== Decorations and awards ==
Max Ritter von Müller is known to have won at least 12 decorations:

- 13 September 1915 - Prussia: Iron Cross of 1914, 2nd class
- 13 September 1915 - Bavaria: Silver Badge for Bravery
- Late 1915 - Bavaria: Military Merit Cross Third Class with Swords
- Late 1915 - Prussia: Iron Cross of 1914, 1st class
- 28 June 1917 - Württemberg: Bravery Medal in Gold
- 14 July 1917 - Prussia: Member's Cross of the Royal House Order of Hohenzollern with Swords
- 3 September 1917 - Prussia: Pour le Mérite
- Autumn 1917 - Bavaria: Gold Badge for Bravery
- 18 December 1917 - Bavaria: Military Merit Order Fourth Class with Swords
- 7 November 1918 (award date; approved 1919) - Bavaria: Knight's Cross of the Military Order of Max Joseph (posthumous)
- Unknown date - Bavaria: Prinzregent Luitpold Medal in Bronze
- Unknown date - Bavaria: Long Service Distinction, Third Class
