= Hugh White (RAF officer) =

British Royal Air Force officer (1898–1983)

Hugh Granville White
- Born: 1 March 1898; Maidstone, Kent, England
- Died: 23 September 1983 (aged 85)
- Military career
- Allegiance: United Kingdom
- Branch: British Army; Royal Air Force
- Service years: 1915–1955
- Rank: Air vice-marshal
- Nickname: Child Pilot
- Units: Buffs (Royal East Kent Regiment); No. 20 Squadron RFC; No. 4 Squadron RAF; No. 28 Squadron RAF
- Commands: No. 41 (Technical) Group (1950–1953); No. 43 (Technical) Group (1948–1950); No. 1 School of Technical Training RAF (1942–1946); No. 501 Squadron RAF (1935–1936); No. 29 Squadron RAF (1919); No. 64 Squadron RAF (1919)
- Conflicts: First World War: Western Front; Second World War
- Awards: Companion of the Order of the Bath; Commander of the Order of the British Empire

Air Vice-Marshal Hugh Granville White, CB, CBE, MIMechE (1 March 1898 – 23 September 1983) was a Royal Air Force air officer. He was a First World War flying ace credited with seven aerial victories, and later went on to serve throughout the Second World War, finally retiring in 1955.

== Early life and background ==
White was born in Maidstone, Kent, and originally chose a naval career, attending the naval training school HMS Conway from 1911, before studying at Eastbourne College from 1914.

== First World War ==
In September 1915, White became an Officer Cadet at the Royal Military College, Sandhurst, and on 7 April 1916 was commissioned as a second lieutenant in the Buffs (Royal East Kent Regiment). He was immediately seconded to the Royal Flying Corps to train as a pilot with No. 5 Reserve Squadron based at RFC Castle Bromwich, flying Maurice Farman Longhorn and Shorthorn aircraft, and later trained with No. 34 and No. 33 Squadrons at RFC Bramham Moor. On 22 June he was appointed a flying officer. After further training in No. 9 Reserve Squadron at Norwich, he was eventually posted to No. 20 Squadron RFC on 5 July 1916, where the 18-year old was promptly nicknamed "Child Pilot".

White was listed as being wounded in February 1917, but had recovered to gain his first aerial victory on 5 April when he and Observer Private T. Allum, flying a F.E.2d two-seater, wounded Josef Flink of Jasta 18 in the hand, and forced him to land his Albatros D.III fighter at Neuve-Église, where he was captured. On 11 April he was appointed a flight commander with the temporary rank of captain, and with observer Second Lieutenant Thomas Lewis, gained two more victories on 23 and 26 May, both times driving an Albatros D.III down out of control. White then returned to the Home Establishment where he served as a flying instructor in No. 59 Training Squadron at RFC Yatesbury. He was promoted to lieutenant on 7 October, and from November served in No. 38 Training Squadron at Rendcomb.

White returned to France on 25 February 1918 to fly a S.E.5a single-seat fighter in No. 29 Squadron RFC. On 1 April 1918 the Royal Flying Corps merged with the Royal Naval Air Service to form the Royal Air Force, and his unit became No. 29 Squadron RAF. On 15 May White drove down an Albatros D.V over Bailleul, then on three successive days, 17, 18 and 19 April, destroyed three Pfalz D.III fighters. In the last of these combats his aircraft collided with that of Karl Pech of Jasta 29, but White shot his opponent down, then managed to nurse his damaged aircraft back to the safety of the British lines before crash landing. White returned to England on 22 May, and served as a flying instructor at No. 9 Training Depot at RAF Shawbury. On 12 July he was appointed a temporary major, and on 17 July was appointed Officer-in-charge Flying Training at No. 30 Training Depot at RAF Northolt.

== Inter-war career ==
White returned to France on 6 January 1919 to serve as Officer Commanding, No. 64 Squadron, based at Froidment, until 8 February when he was appointed OC, No. 29 Squadron, part of the British Occupation Forces, based at Bickendorf, Germany. On 1 August 1919 White was granted a permanent commission in RAF with the rank of lieutenant (later flying officer), resigning his Army commission in the East Kents the same day.

In October 1919, White was attached to Midland Area Depot while attending a Special Engineering Course at Jesus College, Cambridge, then on 1 October 1920 was posted to the No. 1 School of Technical Training at RAF Halton for administrative duties. He was promoted to flight lieutenant on 1 January 1921. On 1 October 1921 he was posted to the School of Army Co-operation at Old Sarum for a course of instruction.

On 15 March 1922, White was posted to No. 4 Squadron RAF, based at RAF Farnborough to fly the Bristol F.2 Fighter, taking part in an aerial display simulating a ground attack in front of an audience that included the King and Queen, Lady May Cambridge, General Lord Cavan, General Sir Thomas Morland, and Squadron Leader Charles Blount, before returning to the School of Army Co-operation at Old Sarum on 17 May to serve as an instructor.

White was posted to India on 1 January 1924 to serve as a flight commander in No. 28 (Army Co-operation) Squadron, where he flew the Bristol Fighter from bases at Peshawar, Quetta and Ambala. On 28 March 1927 he was detached from his squadron to serve as Adjutant at Hill Depot, Lower Topa, before returning to the UK in July. He was posted to the Home Aircraft Depot at RAF Henlow on 19 May 1928, attending the Officers Engineering Course there from 8 August.

White was promoted to squadron leader on 23 April 1930, and on 1 July was appointed Officer-in-charge, Workshops, and Unit Test Pilot at RAF College Cranwell. From 26 June 1933 until 28 January 1935 he served as Equipment (Engineer) Staff Officer at the Headquarters of the Air Defence of Great Britain, RAF Uxbridge, before returning to flying duties as Officer Commanding, No. 501 (City of Bristol) Squadron flying Westland Wallace bombers. On 1 July 1936 White was promoted to wing commander, and from June served as Senior Equipment Staff Officer and Command Engineering Officer at the Headquarters of RAF Far East at Singapore. He returned to England in July 1939 to serve as Officer Commanding, General Engineering Squadron, No. 13 Maintenance Unit, based at RAF Henlow.

== Second World War ==
On 16 October 1939, soon after the outbreak of the Second World War, White was appointed an acting group captain to serve as Senior Air Staff Officer of No. 24 (Technical Training) Group at RAF Quedgeley. He gained promotion to the temporary rank of group captain on 1 January 1940, and on 24 April was transferred to the RAF Technical Branch. His promotion to group captain became permanent on 14 April 1942, and on 3 October he was appointed Air Officer Commanding, No. 1 School of Technical Training at RAF Halton, with the acting rank of air commodore, and was promoted to the same temporary rank on 1 November 1942. On 8 June 1944, in the King's Birthday Honours, White was made a Commander of the Order of the British Empire.

== Post-war career ==
On 11 March 1946, White was appointed Senior Technical Staff Officer, AHQ British Air Forces of Occupation at Bad Eilsen, Germany, and was promoted to air commodore on 1 October 1946. He served as Air Officer Commanding, No. 43 (Technical) Group at RAF Hucknall from 1 November 1948, with the rank of acting air vice-marshal, receiving promotion to the rank of air vice marshal on 1 July 1949. On 6 November 1950 he was appointed Air Officer Commanding, No. 41 (Technical) Group at RAF Andover. He was made a Companion of the Order of the Bath in the 1952 New Year Honours. On 5 February 1953 he became Air Officer Administration at the Headquarters of Maintenance Command. He retired from the RAF on 1 March 1955.

Air Vice Marshal White died on 23 September 1983, at the age of 85.

== Bibliography ==
- Guttman, Jon & Dempsey, Harry (2009). Pusher Aces of World War I. Osprey Publishing. ISBN 978-1-84603-417-6.
