= Stefan Kirmaier =

German flying ace

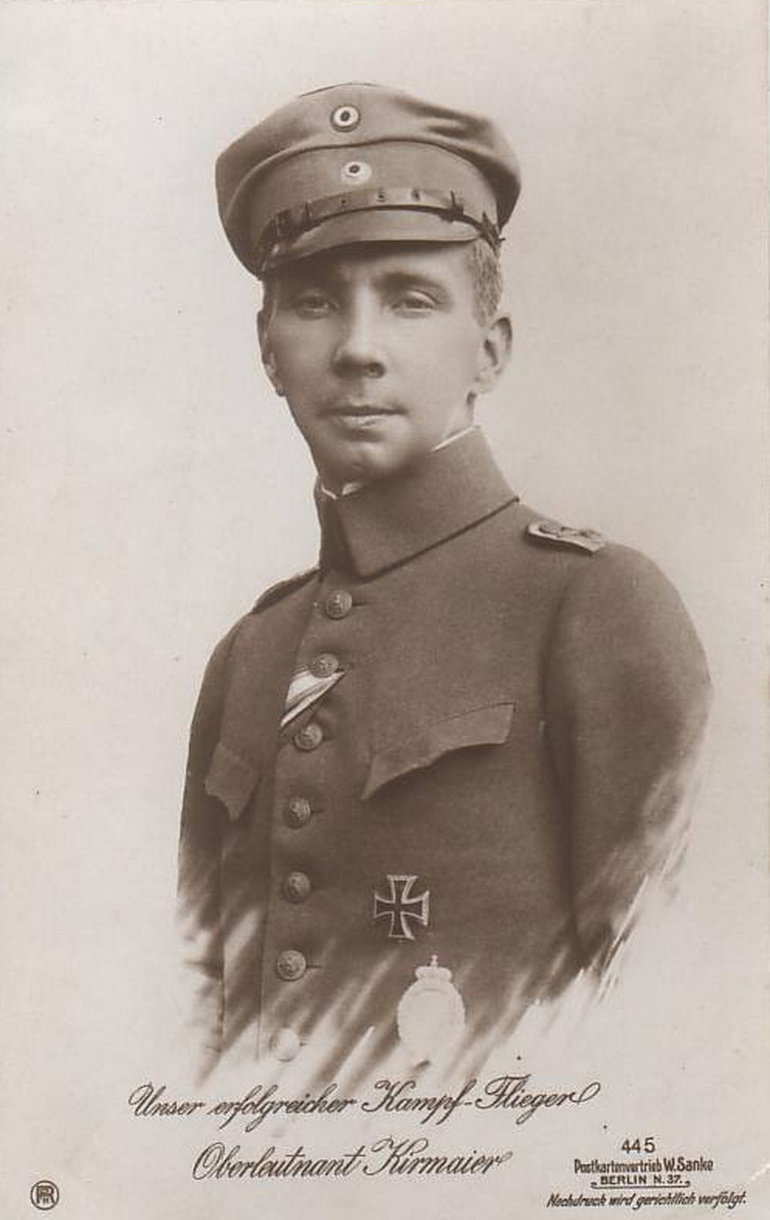
- Born: 28 July 1889; Lachen, Kingdom of Bavaria, German Empire
- Died: 22 November 1916 (aged 27); Lesbœufs, France
- Military career
- Allegiance: German Empire
- Branch: Infantry; Imperial German Air Service
- Rank: Oberleutnant
- Units: 8th Infantry Regiment; Flieger-Abteilung (Artillerie) (Flier Detachment (Artillery)) 203; Kampfeinsitzerkommando (Combat Single-Seater Command) Jametz; Jagdstaffel 2 (Fighter Squadron 2)
- Commands: Jagdstaffel 2
- Awards: Royal House Order of Hohenzollern; Iron Cross

Oberleutnant Stefan Kirmaier (28 July 1889 – 22 November 1916) was a World War I German flying ace credited with eleven aerial victories. Kirmaier would succeed Oswald Boelcke as commander of the famed Jagdstaffel 2 before being killed in action.

== Early life ==
Stefan Kirmaier was born in Lachen, the German Empire, on 28 July 1889.

== World War I service ==
Kirmaier began World War I as an infantryman. After transferring into aviation, he was posted to Flieger-Abteilung (Artillerie) (Flier Detachment (Artillery)) 203 in 1915 and early 1916. He was then attached to Kampfeinsitzerkommando (Combat Single-Seater Command) Jametz, and scored his first three victories during July 1916 while flying a Fokker Eindekker. On 5 October, he was moved up to fly a fighter in Jagdstaffel 2 (Fighter Squadron 2) under the command of Oswald Boelcke. Kirmaier then scored four wins between 17 and 26 October while flying a reddish-brown Albatros D.II. On 28 October 1916, Boelcke was killed in action, and Kirmaier was entrusted with command of the squadron. While in command, he scored four more victories, all in November. On 22 November, Kirmaier died in action from a bullet through the head fired by either John Oliver Andrews or Kelvin Crawford. Kirmaier was also awarded the Royal House Order of Hohenzollern on the 22nd.
