= Emil Thuy =

German fighter ace

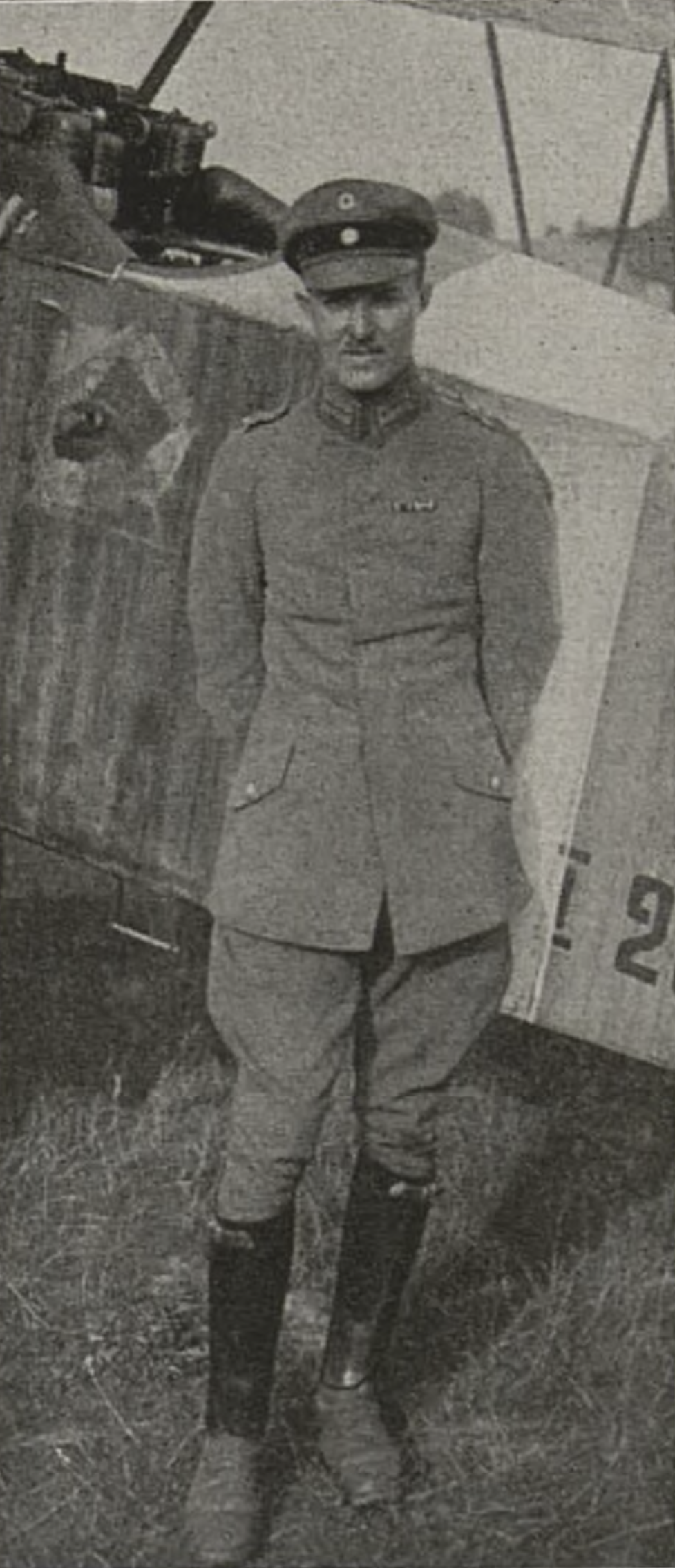
- Emil Thuy in 1918
- Born: 11 March 1894; Hagen, Province of Westphalia, Kingdom of Prussia, German Empire
- Died: 11 June 1930 (aged 36); Near Smolensk, Soviet Union
- Military career
- Allegiance: German Empire
- Branch: Flying service
- Service years: 1914–1930
- Rank: Leutnant
- Units: Flieger-Abteilung (Artillerie) 53, Royal Saxon Jagdstaffel 21, Royal Württemberg Jagdstaffel 28
- Commands: Jagdstaffel 28, Jagdgruppe 7
- Awards: Pour le Merite, Royal House Order of Hohenzollern, Iron Cross First and Second Class
- Other work: Involved in covert founding of Finnish Air Force and Luftwaffe

Emil Thuy (11 March 1894 – 11 June 1930), Pour le Merite, Württemberg's Order of Military Merit, House Order of Hohenzollern, Iron Cross First and Second Class, was one of the leading German fighter aces of World War I, with 35 victories. After the war, he was an adviser to the Finnish air force and was involved in the secret origins of the Luftwaffe within the Soviet Union.

== Early life ==
Emil Thuy was born in Hagen, Germany, the son of a factory owner. He was interested in airplanes even as a child, building models and testing a glider.

After graduation from secondary school, he worked for a while in a colliery in Lebanon, Germany. He then enrolled in 1913 in the Faculty of Mining at the Technical University of Clausthal; he was interested in metallurgical engineering.

== Military service ==
In August, 1914, Thuy volunteered to serve as a pioneer, which was the German equivalent of a combat engineer. After only six weeks basic training, he was rushed into combat. In November, 1914, he was so severely wounded as to be considered unfit for further military service.

Nevertheless, when he recuperated, he volunteered for the Imperial German Air Service. He underwent aviation training in Berlin. He then reported for duty with FFA 53, which was a reconnaissance unit that spotted and directed artillery fire from the air. He reported in on 10 July 1915 as a vizefeldwebel or non-commissioned pilot. He would remain with FFA 53 until 1 November 1916. Despite flying a two-seater plane poorly suited for combat, he scored his first victory on 8 September 1915.

On 1 November 1916, he entered fighter pilot training, graduating only 18 days later. He was then assigned to Jagdstaffel 21 (Jasta 21), then equipped with Albatros fighters. He was commissioned Leutnant (lieutenant) in the reserves on 27 March 1917 after three weeks training.

On 16 April 1917, after joining Jasta 21, he scored his second victory. He began to tally triumphs on a regular basis. By the time he left Jasta 21 on 29 September 1917, his list read 14, with number 14 being shot down on 22 September.

He then transferred to command Jagdstaffel 28, which had lost two commanders killed in action in the previous month. On 24 September, he scored his first victory with his new squadron. He continued to accumulate wins on a steady basis, by ones and twos.

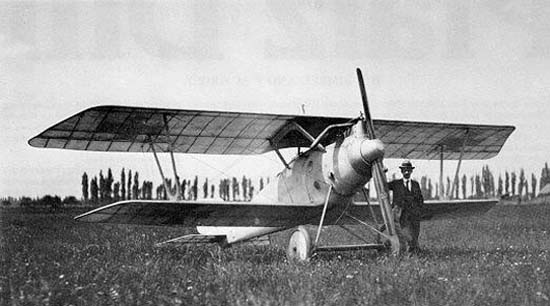
Pfalz D.III prototype in April 1917. Thuy flew a Pfalz to some of his victories.

He was injured in a crash on 2 February 1918. On the 20th, he was discharged from hospital and returned to duty. On 30 June 1918, he was awarded the Blue Max (Pour le Merite). At about this time, he changed aircraft from the Pfalz D.III he had been flying, to a Fokker D.VII. In July, Jagdgruppe 7 was founded, incorporating his Jasta and three others. Thuy commanded both JG 7 and Jasta 28 simultaneously.

He ended his victory string with a double victory on 14 October 1918. In his combat career, he had earned several awards even before the Pour le Merite; besides both classes of the Iron Cross, he had also been given the Knight's Cross of the Military Merit Order of Württemberg.

== Post World War I ==
Thuy resumed his studies and upon graduation, joined his father in the family's factory in Hagen. He wrote treatises on aviation on the side. As a result, he received an offer from Siemens-Schuckert to be a "technical consultant" for the Finnish Air Force.

Thuy was a member of a paramilitary veterans organization known as Der Stahlhelm, which was the armed wing of the German National People's Party. He was active in the resistance to the French and Belgian occupation of the Ruhr.

He then went to Finland in early 1923 as an Oberleutnant or senior lieutenant. He was the head of the aerial gunnery department of the Finnish Air Force Flying School, departing finally about 16 August 1924.

The Treaty of Versailles banned Germany from having an air force. To get around this, a secret training base was established in the Soviet Union, at Lipetsk fighter-pilot school, in 1924. Thuy was offered the opportunity to serve there and accepted.

On 11 June 1930, while flying from Moscow to Berlin as part of this mission, Thuy crashed fatally in the vicinity of Smolensk. He was testing a secret Albatros L 76 reconnaissance airplane at the time.

== Bibliography ==
- Franks, Norman and Greg Wyngarden (2004) et al. Fokker D.VII Aces of World War I: Part 2. Osprey Publishing. ASIN: B00SLUY3RM.
- Franks, Norman and Frank Bailey (1993). Above the Lines: The Aces and Fighter Units of the German Air Service, Naval Air Service and Flanders Marine Corps 1914 - 1918 Grub Street. ISBN 0-948817-73-9, ISBN 978-0-948817-73-1.
