= Otto Hartmann (aviator) =

- Born: 7 February 1889; Nassau, Kingdom of Württemberg, German Empire
- Died: 3 September 1917 (aged 28) over English Channel, off Diksmuide, Belgium
- Burial place: Vladslo, Belgium
- Military career
- Allegiance: German Empire
- Branch: Aviation
- Service years: 1908 - 1917
- Rank: Hauptmann
- Units: Flieger-Abteilung (Flier Detachment) 48; Kampfstaffel; (Tactical Bomber Squadron) 48; Schutzstaffel (Protection Squadron) 3; Jagdstaffel 18 (Fighter Squadron 18)
- Commands: Jagdstaffel 28 (Fighter Squadron 28)
- Conflicts: World War I †
- Awards: Iron Cross (both classes); Kingdom of Württemberg's Medal of Military Merit

Hauptmann Otto Hartmann (7 February 1889 – 3 September 1917) was a German World War I flying ace credited with seven aerial victories.

== Biography ==
Otto Hartmann was born on 7 February 1889, in Nassau, Kingdom of Württemberg, the German Empire. He entered the Imperial German Army as a cadet on 5 March 1908.

He was in service during early World War I, being twice wounded, on 12 August 1915 and 10 June 1916. During 1916, he became an aerial observer in Flieger-Abteilung (Flier Detachment) 48 of the Luftstreitkräfte. He was promoted to Hauptmann on 6 October 1916. Hartmann won his first aerial victories as an observer, on 22 October and 6 November 1916. He undertook pilot training and was posted to Schutzstaffel (Protection Squadron) 3. On 17 May 1917, he was transferred to Jagdstaffel (fighter squadron) 18. On 6 June 1917, he took command of Jagdstaffel 28 after its Staffelführer, Karl Emil Schafer, was killed in action. Hartmann would score five more aerial victories between 21 June and 21 August 1917.

At 0815 hours 3 September 1917, Otto Hartmann was killed by two bullets through the head while engaging a No.48 Squadron Bristol F.2 Fighter crewed by Lts. Robert Dodds and Thomas Tuffield. Hartmann and his plane fell into the English Channel north of Diksmuide, Belgium. Four days later, Hartmann's remains washed up on the Belgian coast. He was buried in grave 504, Steinbach Cemetery, Germany.

During his service to his country, Otto Hartmann was awarded both classes of the Iron Cross and the Kingdom of Württemberg's Medal of Military Merit.
