= Karl Emil Schäfer =

Emil Schäfer
- Born: 17 December 1891; Krefeld, Germany
- Died: 5 June 1917 (aged 25); Becelaere-Zandvoorde, Belgium
- Military career
- Allegiance: German Empire
- Branch: Luftstreitkräfte
- Service years: 1914–1917
- Rank: Leutnant
- Nicknames: Karlchen ("Charlie")
- Units: 10th Jäger Regiment; 7th Jäger Reserve Regiment; Kampfgeschwader 2; Kampfstaffel 11; Jagdstaffel 11
- Commands: Jagdstaffel 28
- Conflicts: World War I • Eastern Front • Western Front
- Awards: Pour le Mérite; Iron Cross First & Second Class; Knight's Cross with Swords of the Royal House Order of Hohenzollern; Wound Badge

Karl Emil Schäfer (17 December 1891 – 5 June 1917) was a German pilot during World War I; he became one of the major German flying aces of the war, with 30 confirmed aerial victories.

== Early life and infantry service ==
Schäfer was born in Krefeld and joined the Jäger Regiment zu Pferde Nr. 10 of the Prussian Army for his One-year volunteer military service. An engineering student who spoke fluent French and English, he was a fine draughtsman, and was studying in Paris when the war broke out. He managed to return to Germany and was assigned to the Reserve Jäger Bataillon 7 in Bückeburg. He won the Iron Cross 2nd class and was promoted to Vizefeldwebel during September 1914, before being badly wounded and hospitalised for six months. After returning to the front line, he was commissioned as Leutnant in May 1915.

== Flying service ==
Requesting flying duties, Schäfer trained as a pilot and served over the Eastern Front with Kampfgeschwader 2 from July 1916 onwards. He was posted to the Western Front and now flew with Kampfstaffel 11 of KG 2, where he gained his first victory. With just this single victory, he impudently telegraphed Manfred von Richthofen, who was assembling a "top gun" (kanone) squadron at Jasta 11, "Can you use me?" Richthofen replied, "You have already been requested."

Schäfer was then posted to Jasta 11 on 21 February 1917. In intensive operations during Bloody April he became a flying ace, being credited with 21 victories and awarded the Pour le Mérite. While a member of Jasta 11, "Karlchen" (Charlie) became known as the squadron's prankster and recorded many vivid incidents in combat and at play. He flew an Albatros D.III with red and black markings. Somehow amidst all this he found time to pen his autobiography, Vom Jaeger zum Flieger ("From Soldier to Pilot").

== Command and death in action ==
Schäfer was then given command of Jasta 28 on 26 April, and after gaining further victories for a total of 30 claims, Schäfer was shot down and killed on 5 June 1917 in combat with No. 20 Squadron. An F.E.2d flown by Lt. Harold Satchell and observer Lt. Thomas Lewis disabled his plane, which broke apart in midair. Both men reported that the Albatros fell in flames. Max Ritter von Müller of Jasta 28 reported seeing it break up, but noted no fire. Photos of the wreckage show no scorching and the wings still attached to the aircraft. His Jasta 28 comrades recovered Schäfer's body, noting that it had no bullet wounds, but that every bone in his body had been broken.

His remains were taken back to his hometown Krefeld and were buried in the main cemetery. The funeral was attended by Manfred von Richthofen.

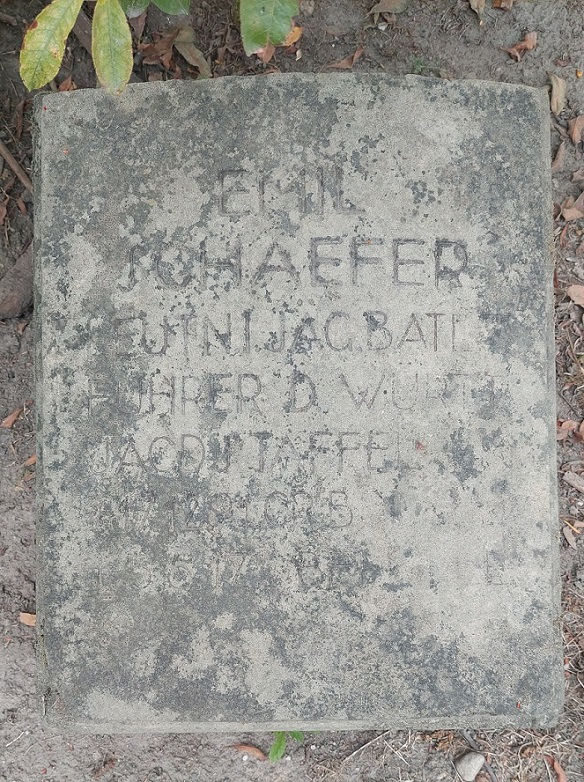

With 29 of his victories flying the Albatros D.III, he was one of the most successful pilots in the type.

== Combat record ==
List of aerial victories
No.	Date/time	Unit	Aircraft	Foe	Location
1	22 January 1917	Jasta 11	Albatros D.II	Caudron	West of Pont-à-Mousson
2	4 March 1917 @ 1150	Jasta 11	Albatros D.III	Sopwith 1½ Strutter (A1109)	South-west of Haisnes
u/c	4 March 1917	Jasta 11		DH.2 or F.E.8	Near Lens
u/c	4 March 1917	Jasta 11		DH.2 or F.E.8	Near Béthune
3	6 March 1917 @ 1145	Jasta 11		Sopwith 1½ Strutter (A978)	Lens
4	6 March 1917 @ 1155	Jasta 11		Sopwith 1½ Strutter	Lens
5	9 March 1917 @ 1120	Jasta 11		F.E.8 (6397)	Faschoda
6	9 March 1917 @ 1122	Jasta 11		F.E.8 (4874)	Pont-à-Vendin
7	11 March 1917 @ 1120	Jasta 11		B.E.2c (6232)	Loosbogen
8	24 March 1917 @ 0900	Jasta 11		Sopwith 1½ Strutter	Anzin, near Arras
9	3 April 1917 @ 1620	Jasta 11		F.E.2d (6371)	South of Lens
10	6 April 1917 @ 1020	Jasta 11		B.E.2	Givenchy
11	6 April 1917 @ 1037	Jasta 11		B.E.2	West of Vimy
12	7 April 1917 @ 1745	Jasta 11		Nieuport 23	Mecatal
13	8 April 1917 @ 1440	Jasta 11		DH.4	Épinoy
14	9 April 1917 @ 1900	Jasta 11		B.E.2d (5742)	Aise Roulette
15	11 April 1917 @ 0910	Jasta 11		Bristol F.2A (A3318)	Fampoux
16	11 April 1917 @ 1250	Jasta 11		B.E.2e	Arras
17	13 April 1917 @ 1830	Jasta 11		F.E.2b (A6372)	Le Point du Jour
18	14 April 1917 @ 1705	Jasta 11		F.E.2b (4877)	Lievin-Eleu
19	14 April 1917 @ 1720	Jasta 11		B.E or Bristol F.2a	La Coulette
20	21 April 1917 @ 1745	Jasta 11		Nieuport Scout (A6797)	East of Fresnes
21	22 April 1917 @ 2020	Jasta 11		F.E.2b	North-west of Moncy-Tilloy
22	25 April 1917 @ 1040	Jasta 11		F.E.2b (A837)	Bailleul
23	25 April 1917 @ 2030	Jasta 11		Bristol F.2a (A3352)	Bahnhoff Roeux
24	1 May 1917 @ 1240	Jasta 28		Farman	Diksmuide
25	1 May 1917 @ 1300	Jasta 28		Nieuport Scout	East of Poperinge
26	9 May 1917 @ 1900	Jasta 28		Sopwith 1½ Strutter	Warneton
27	18 May 1917 @ 1110	Jasta 28		F.E.2d	Hollebeke
28	23 May 1917 @ 1615	Jasta 28		F.E.2d	Warenton
29	23 May 1917 @ 1845	Jasta 28		Sopwith Pup	Wytschaetebogen
30	4 June 1917 @ 1410	Jasta 28		D.H.4 (A7420)	Moorslede

== See also ==
- List of World War I aces credited with 20 or more victories
- Aerial victory standards of World War I
