= Luftschiffer =

Luftschiffertruppe, a German word meaning "airshipmen's troop", was the designation of the German airship units.

== Military lighter-than-air aviation ==
The origin of the Luftschiffertruppe was the Versuchsabteilung der Luftschiffertruppe ("experimental airship unit") first raised in 1884 as part of the army which was tasked with the evaluation of tethered observation balloons, first using ball-type balloons but in 1896 introducing elongated Parseval-Sigsfeld kite balloons.

On August 1, 1914, the distinction was made between

- Feldluftschiffer units operating observation balloons at the frontline,
- Festungsluftschiffer units with territorial defense duties,
- the Luftschifftruppe operating free-flying airships.

In October 1916, the Feldluftschiffer were subordinated to the "Commanding General of the Air Force".

== The Luftschifftruppe ==
The origin of the Luftschifftruppe ("airship troop") was a special Versuchskompanie für Motorluftschiffahrt ("experimental unit for powered airship navigation") organized in 1906 as part of the Luftschiffertruppe. After tests of the different available airship types, the semi-rigid Groß airship and the Parseval blimp were abandoned while the rigid airships of Zeppelin and Schütte-Lanz design were selected for service.

While the use of airships for military purposes had been pioneered by the German army, in 1913 the navy raised their own airship troops. After operating in varying command structures for the first years of the war, in late 1916 the navy took over airship operations on the western front while the army became responsible for the east and the Balkans.

== World War I ==
Until 1918, the army launched 50 airships, the navy 73. 17 army and 23 navy ships were lost to the enemy, 9 army and 30 navy ships were lost to other causes.

The Luftschiffer became the backbone of German aerial warfare in the first years of the War, conducting reconnaissance flights as well as the first bombings of cities, including Paris and London.

Upon the outbreak of World War I, the Luftschifftruppe numbered around 20–25 zeppelins in service. The Luftschifftruppe began aerial surveillance early on in Belgium and France, but often came under fire by anti-aircraft guns. Because of their slow speed, they were very vulnerable. After three Zeppelins were shot down in the first month alone, the Luftschiffer were switched to naval surveillance, observing British ship movements, in which capacity they played a decisive role in the Battle of Jutland. Tests were done of dropping bombs from Zeppelins in order to increase their potential. Zeppelins had a typical carrying capacity of almost 9 metric tons, making them useful enough for this operation. Following the Christmas truce, Kaiser Wilhelm II approved of the Luftschifftruppe's bombing of England. On January 19, 1915, the first bombs fell over Britain, when two Zeppelins dropped 50 kg explosives on villages outside Great Yarmouth. Five people died in the first raid; 18 more raids that year would end in almost 900 casualties. Following the terror, the British government began taking measures to stop the bombings. Anti-aircraft guns were set up all over south-eastern England, as well as spotlights for night time.

The bombings in 1916 were more intense than in 1915. After an accidental bomb-dropping on London, the Kaiser approved of raids directly against the city's urban center. Twenty-three raids on London resulted in around 1,800 casualties. Despite safety precautions, civilians were still unprepared for the raids and zeppelins were still able to avoid defenses. By 1917 and 1918 the threat the Luftschifftruppe posed to London was diminished. Large-scale introduction of fighter planes caused nearly half of the planned bombings to end in failure. Only eleven successful raids occurred in the last year of the war. Nearly 80 zeppelins had been built for the Luftschifftruppe during the war; around 60 of them were shot down, including Peter Strasser's own zeppelin, with himself on board.

== The Treaty of Versailles ==
The Luftschiffer's career and service to Germany came to an end when, following World War I, the Luftschifftruppe was dismantled and barred from existence by the Treaty of Versailles, which prohibited Germany from owning an air force under articles 198 and 202.

== See also ==
- Zeppelin
- Schütte-Lanz
- Peter Strasser
