= Ernst Bormann =

German flying ace (1897–1960)

- Bormann as an Oberst
- Born: 5 November 1897; Kirchbrak
- Died: 1 August 1960 (aged 62); Düsseldorf
- Military career
- Allegiance: German Empire; Weimar Republic (to 1920); Nazi Germany
- Branch: Luftstreitkräfte; Luftwaffe
- Service years: 1915–20, 1934–45
- Rank: Generalmajor
- Unit: Jagdstaffel "Boelcke"
- Commands: KG 76
- Conflicts: World War I World War II
- Awards: Knight's Cross of the Iron Cross with Oak Leaves
- Other work: CDU politician

Ernst Bormann (5 November 1897 – 1 August 1960) was a German World War I Luftstreitkräfte flying ace and a Generalmajor of the Luftwaffe during World War II. He was also a recipient of the Knight's Cross of the Iron Cross with Oak Leaves.

He surrendered to the Soviet forces on 10 May 1945 and was released on 9 October 1955.

== Career ==
Ernst Bormann was born on 5 November 1897 in Kirchbrak.

He joined Reserve Infantry Regiment No. 82 on 17 August 1915 as a cadet. Bormann transferred to aviation, being sent to Fliegerersatz-Abteilung 7 ("Replacement Detachment 7") on 7 March 1917. He moved on to FEA 12 on 24 October 1917. He was at Armee-Flug-Park (Army Flight Park) 9 when he received his first operational assignment; on 8 January 1918, he was posted to Feldflieger Abteilung (Field Flier Detachment) 42. On 4 May 1918, Leutnant Bormann was posted to a prestigious fighter squadron, Carl Bolle's Jagdstaffel 2, which was equipped with Germany's best fighter of the war, the Fokker D.VII. Beginning 3 July 1918, Bormann was credited with downing 17 enemy aircraft, most of them fighters, by 4 November 1918.

Ernst Bormann was a flying instructor from 1 August 1925 to 30 September 1930, at the nascent Luftwaffe's covert aviation training center at Lipetsk, the Soviet Union. He returned to Germany to instruct there. In 1934, after Hitler's rise to power, Bormann was commissioned as a captain in the Luftwaffe. From 1 April 1935 to 31 May 1938, he was a staffelkapitän for Kampfgeschwader Boelcke. From 1 July to 31 October 1938, he commanded III. Gruppe of Jagdgeschwader 132. His next assignment was the command of Lehrgeschwader (Advanced Training Wing) 1; this posting lasted until July 1940.

During World War II, Bormann succeeded to command of Kampfgeschwader 76. As a major general, he was the Fliegerführer Crimea from February to June 1943. He was taken prisoner by the Soviet forces on 10 May 1945. Bormann returned from imprisonment in the Soviet Union in October 1955. He earned a Doctorate before dying in Düsseldorf on 1 August 1960.

== Awards ==
- Iron Cross (1914)
  - 2nd Class (24 July 1916)
  - 1st Class (13 August 1918)
- Clasp to the Iron Cross (1939)
  - 2nd Class (22 September 1939)
  - 1st Class (10 October 1939)
- Bild des Reichsmarschalls im Silberrahmen (15 September 1941)
- Knight's Cross of the Iron Cross with Oak Leaves
  - Knight's Cross on 5 October 1941 as Oberstleutnant and Geschwaderkommodore of Kampfgeschwader 76
  - 119th Oak Leaves on 3 September 1942 as Oberst and commander of the Gefechtsverband Bormann, augmenting Kampfgeschwader 76

Military offices
Preceded by Oberst Stefan Fröhlich	Commander of Kampfgeschwader 76; 26 February 1941 – 7 January 1943	Succeeded by Major Wilhelm von Friedburg
