= Jagdstaffel 28 =

Jasta 28
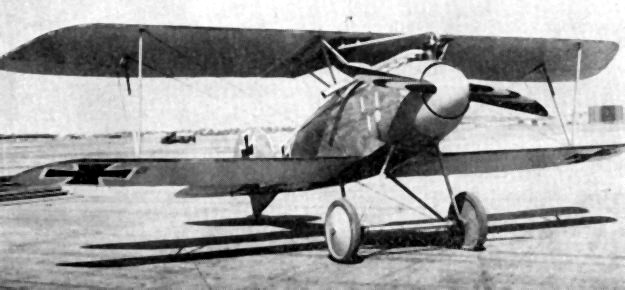
- Jasta 28 was founded with Albatross D.III fighters.
- Active: 1916–1918
- Country: German Empire
- Branch: Luftstreitkräfte
- Type: Fighter squadron
- Engagements: World War I

Royal Württemberg Jagdstaffel 28, commonly abbreviated to Jasta 28, was a "hunting group" (i.e., fighter squadron) of the Luftstreitkräfte, the air arm of the Imperial German Army during World War I. As one of the original German fighter squadrons, the unit would score 100 verified aerial victories. The Jasta would pay a blood price for its success: nine pilots killed in action, three wounded in action, one injured in a collision, and one prisoner of war.

== History ==
Royal Württemberg Jagdstaffel 28 was founded on 14 December 1916 at FEA 10 at Böblingen. Oberleutnant Lang from Jasta 11 was assigned to command it. After Leutnant Lang's reassignment, the squadron would have three commanders killed in combat within four months. Leutnant Emil Thuy then took over, and helmed the squadron throughout war's end.

== Commanding officers (Staffelführer) ==
1. Oberleutnant Rudolf Lang. Appointed from Jasta 11 on 20 January 1917 – transferred out on 27 April 1917.
2. Leutnant Karl Schäfer. Transferred in from Jasta 11 on 27 April 1917 – 5 June 1917 (KIA).
3. Hauptmann Otto Hartmann. Transferred in from Jasta 18 on 8 June 1917 – 3 September 1917 (KIA).
4. Oberleutnant Werner Jahns. Assigned on 6 September 1917 – 24 September 1917 (KIA).
5. Leutnant Emil Thuy. Transferred in from Jasta 21 on 26 September 1917 – 11 November 1918.

== Aerodromes ==
1. Böblingen, Kingdom of Württemberg: 14 December 1916 – 23 January 1917
2. Marcke (near Courtrai), Belgium: 24 January 1917 – 25 March 1917
3. Wasquehal: 26 March 1917 – 26 August 1917
4. Varsenare, Belgium: 27 August 1917 – 13 November 1917
5. Jabbeke, Belgium: 13 November 1917 – 25 November 1917
6. Wynghene: 25 November 1917 – 7 December 1917
7. Varsenare, Belgium: 7 December 1917 – 5 February 1918
8. Wynghene: 5 February 1918 – 1 March 1918
9. Iseghem: 1 March 1918 – 21 March 1918
10. Abeele, Belgium: 21 March 1918 – 29 March 1918
11. Iseghem: 29 March 1918 – 5 June 1918
12. Ennemain, France: 6 June 1918 – 7 July 1918
13. Neuflize, France: 8 July 1918 – 10 August 1918
14. Mons-en-Chaussée: 11 August 1918 – 12 August 1918
15. Neuflize: 13 August 1918 – 24 August 1918
16. Cantin, France: 25 August 1918 – 30 September 1918
17. Beuvry, France: 1 October 1918 – 12 October 1918
18. Chièvres, Belgium: 13 October 1918 – 3 November 1918
19. Champles, Waterloo: 4 November 1918 – 11 November 1918

== Notable members ==
Karl Schäfer, Pour le Mérite, Royal House Order of Hohenzollern, Iron Cross, transferred into the commander's slot with 23 victories, and scored seven more with the squadron before his death.

Max von Müller's maiden victory for his new squadron was followed by 23 more, including three over British aces, before he transferred to command of Jasta 2; he would end the war with the Pour le Mérite, Iron Cross, and Military Order of Max Joseph.

Carl Bolle became an ace early on with the squadron, before moving on to Jasta 2, winning the Pour le Mérite, Hohenzollern, and Iron Cross.

Ernst Hess had scored one of the earlier aerial victories in history to start his string on 5 January 1916; he scored a dozen times with Jasta 28, and had earned the Hohenzollern and Iron Cross before his death in action.

Karl Christ, who scored the Jasta's final victory, earned an Iron Cross and went on to serve in the World War II Luftwaffe.

August Hanko won a Military Merit Cross as an enlisted man, was commissioned, and went on to command Jasta 64.

Otto Hartmann's short reign in the squadron brought this old soldier acedom and an Iron Cross.

Emil Thuy transferred in from Jasta 21 and headed Jasta 28 for the last 13 of the 20 months it existed; he ended the war with the Pour le Mérite, Hohenzollern, and Iron Cross.

== Aircraft ==
Jasta 28 was known to use Albatros D.III and Albatros D.V fighter aircraft.

== Operations ==
Jasta 28 began its battle career on the 4 Armee front at Marcke on 24 January 1917. It moved to support of 6 Armee on 26 March 1917. The new squadron flew its first combat patrol on 2 April; its first win came five days later. On 27 August, Jasta 28 moved to Varssenaere, and back to support of 4 Armee. They would remain there until 6 June 1918, when they moved to Ennemain and support of 2 Armee. A month later, on 8 July, they were off to Neuflize, and support of 1 Armee. On 25 August, the Jasta moved to Cantin to support the 17 Armee. It ended the war in this assignment.
