= Jagdstaffel 2 =

Jasta 2
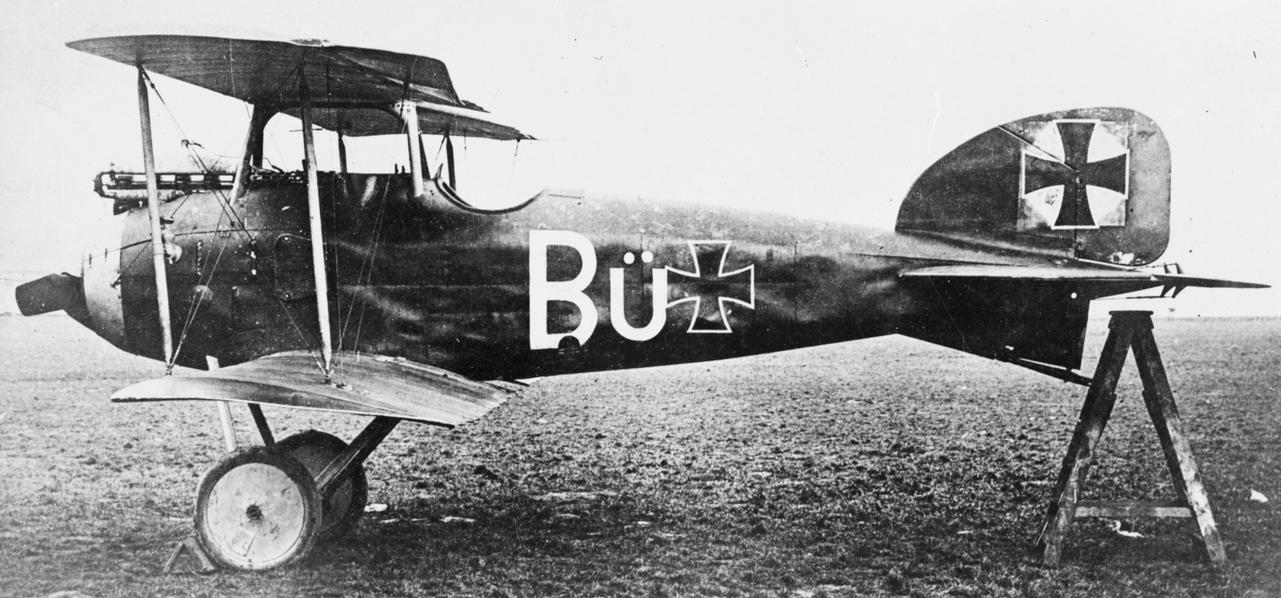
- Jasta 2 Albatross D 1 391/16 (w/n 2944) of Karl Heinrich Büttner downed 16 November 1916 by Cpt. Parker and Lt. Hervey in a B.E.2c
- Active: 1916–1918
- Country: German Empire
- Branch: Luftstreitkräfte
- Type: Fighter squadron
- Engagements: World War I

Jasta 2 (Jagdstaffel Zwei in full and also known as Jasta Boelcke) was one of the best-known German Luftstreitkräfte squadrons in World War I. Its first commanding officer was the great aerial tactician Oswald Boelcke, and it was the incubator of several notable aviation careers.

== Formation ==
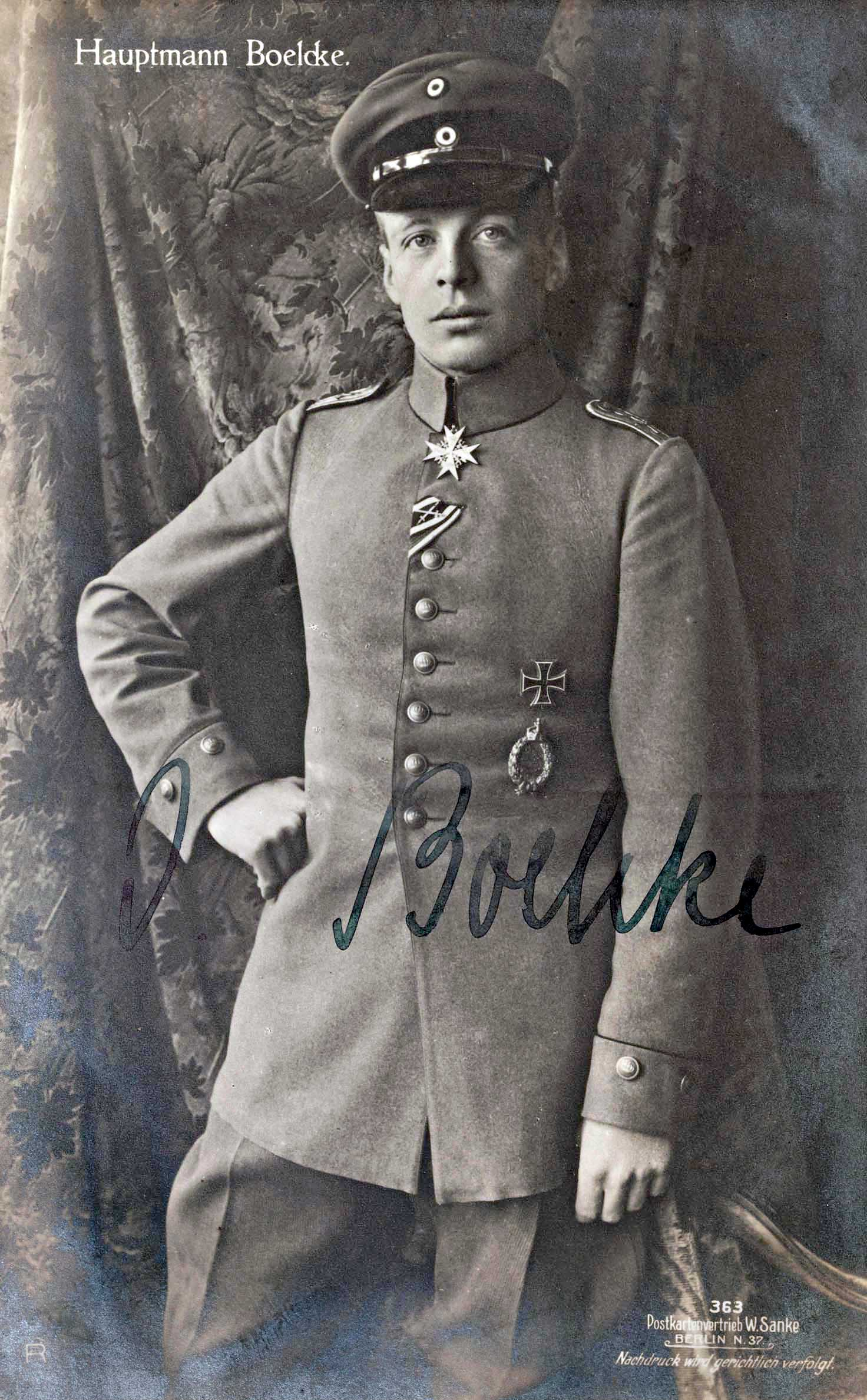
Hauptmann Oswald Boelcke

As one of the first Jastas, Jasta 2 had no parent unit and there was therefore no mass transfer of personnel from existing Staffeln. Assigned to the German 1st Army, the unit was created with the intention that Hauptmann Oswald Boelcke would be its leader. Jasta 2 was formed on 10 August 1916 at Bertincourt, France. Boelcke was ordered to return from an inspection tour of south-eastern theatres of the War to take command and arrived back on the Western Front later that month.

After Max Immelmann's death, Kaiser Wilhelm II had ordered Boelcke grounded for a month to avoid losing him in combat soon after Immelmann. He had become such an important hero to the German public, as well as such an authority on aerial warfare, that he could not be risked. Given a choice between a desk job and a tour of the Middle East, Boelcke downed a Nieuport over Douaumont on 27 June and reported to headquarters. Boelcke was detailed to share his expertise with the head of German military aviation. What had been known previously as the Deutsches Heer's Fliegertruppen des deutschen Kaiserreiches was being reorganized into the Luftstreitkräfte in mid-1916; this reorganization was inspired by Boelcke. At this time, Boelcke codified his Dicta, promulgating axioms for individual pilot success, as well as a requirement for teamwork directed by a formation's leader. Boelcke also shared his views on creation of a fighter arm, and the organization of fighter squadrons.

Boelcke was sent on a tour of the Balkans. He transited Austria to visit Turkey. Upon his return swing, he visited Bulgaria and the Russian Front. Boelcke would be visiting Wilhelm in Kovel when he received a telegram from the head of German aviation, Feldflugchef (Aviation Chief of Staff) Oberstleutnant Hermann von der Lieth-Thomsen, appointing him to raise, organize and command Royal Prussian Jagdstaffel 2. He was given permission to choose his own pilots to form a fighter squadron. Among his first selections upon his return were Manfred von Richthofen, Erwin Böhme and Hans Reimann.

== Principal Operational Activities ==
=== 1916 ===
Boelcke was appointed commander of Jasta 2 on 30 August 1916. The unit utilised the empty buildings vacated by FFA 32 in the Vélu Woods.

The first aircraft arrived on 1 September; two Fokker DIIIs and an Albatros D.I. By 8 September there were eight pilots on strength, including Manfred von Richthofen, Erwin Böhme and Otto Höhne. Three days later, Böhme noted he was pushing for permission to use his castoff Halberstadt, since Boelcke had a Fokker; there seemed to be four airplanes in the squadron by then. On 16 September, Boelcke's new squadron received five new Albatros D.Is for the pilots, and an improved Albatros D.II for the Staffelführer. Lt. Otto Höhne took his Albatros D.I out on a solo flight that same evening and became the first pilot to down an enemy aircraft with the new model, forcing down a British F.E.2b and capturing the pilot. Boelcke promptly put the new planes in the air on the first-ever fighter unit effort to gain local air superiority. At 1300 hours, 17 September, Boelcke and five of his pilots took off; they intercepted a British bombing raid on Marcoing Railway Station. While Boelcke held aside, his five younger pilots bounced a British formation of 14 planes, broke it up, and shot down two - one being Manfred von Richthofen's first victory, the other falling to Erwin Böhme. Boelcke himself added another. That night, a German army tradition began and a new German air force custom was established when the enlisted men were invited into the Jasta's social center.

Boelcke shot down ten Royal Flying Corps planes in his first month with Jasta 2, September 1916. He would fly a solo mission in the morning and return to his "cubs" for afternoon training. However, in contrast to his freebooting style, his pilots always flew in disciplined formations in practice, and he repeatedly drilled them in his tactics. He not only preached this doctrine to his own "cubs"; he proselytized throughout the Luftstreitkräfte. He wrote upon his ideas, sketched them out, and delivered them in person to other aerodromes. Thus, Jasta 2 became the birthplace of fighter aviation tactics.

Boelcke was killed on 28 October 1916 when his Albatros D.II crashed after colliding with the Albatros D.I of Lt. Erwin Böhme during a dogfight with British aircraft. Oblt. Stefan Kirmaier, who had ten victories of his own, was appointed leadership in his place. Kirmaier's command was to be short-lived; on 22 November, he lost his life after a fight with fliers from No. 24 Squadron. Hpt. Franz Walz arrived from Jasta 29 a week later.

=== 1917 ===
The unit's 100th claim was during February 1917, and the Jasta then moved to Eswars on 14 March, before arriving at Pronville soon after.

=== 1918 ===
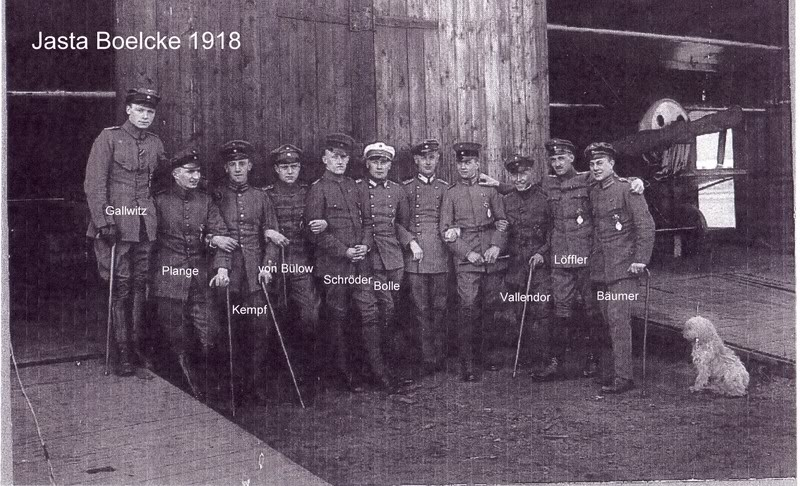
A group photo of the pilots of Jasta 2 "Boelcke" (1918).Paul Bäumer at the far right

Jasta 2 became part of the new Royal Prussian Jagdgeschwader III in February 1918, under the command of Bruno Loerzer.

Jagdstaffel 2 became the second-highest scoring fighter unit (behind Jasta 11); it ended the war with 23 aces among its ex- and current members, a total of 336 victories and a casualty list of only 44; 31 killed, 9 wounded, 2 prisoners of war, and 2 killed in accidents.

Jasta 2 markings were usually black and white tailplanes and elevators (top and bottom)—one side black, one side white.

== Commanding officers (Staffelführer) ==
1. Hauptmann Oswald Boelcke (27 August to 22 September 1916)
2. Oberleutnant Günther Viehweger (acting) (22 September to 23 September 1916)
3. Hauptmann Oswald Boelcke (23 September 1916 to 28 October 1916)
4. Oberleutnant Stefan Kirmaier (30 October to 22 November 1916)
5. Oberleutnant Karl Bodenschatz (acting) (22 November to 29 November 1916)
6. Hauptmann Franz Walz (29 November 1916 to 9 June 1917)
7. Oberleutnant Fritz Otto Bernert (9 June to 28 June 1917)
8. Leutnant Otto Hunzinger (acting) (28 June to 29 June 1917)
9. Oberleutnant Fritz Otto Bernert (29 June to 18 August 1917)
10. Leutnant Erwin Böhme (18 August to 29 November 1917)
11. Leutnant Eberhard Fr. von Gudenburg (acting) (29 November to 13 December 1917)
12. Leutnant Walter von Bülow-Bothkamp (13 December 1917 to 6 January 1918)
13. Leutnant Max Ritter von Müller (acting) (6 January to 9 January 1918)
14. Leutnant Theodor Cammann (acting) (9 January to 26 January 1918)
15. Leutnant Otto Höhne (26 January to 20 February 1918)
16. Leutnant Carl Bolle (20 February to 4 September 1918)
17. Leutnant Otto Löffler (acting) (4 September to 18 September 1918)
18. Oberleutnant Karl Bolle (18 September 1918 to Disbandment)

== Notable personnel ==
23 aces served with Jasta 2 at some time or other. Apart from the Staffelführern listed above, these include the following notables:

1. Paul Bäumer
2. Werner Voss
3. Ernst Bormann
4. Manfred von Richthofen
5. Hermann Frommherz
6. Karl Gallwitz
7. Hans Imelmann
8. Leopold Reimann
9. Adolf von Tutschek
10. Dieter Collin
11. Gerhard Bassenge
12. Hermann Vallendor
