= Military Merit Order (Württemberg) =

Military Merit Order (Militärverdienstorden)
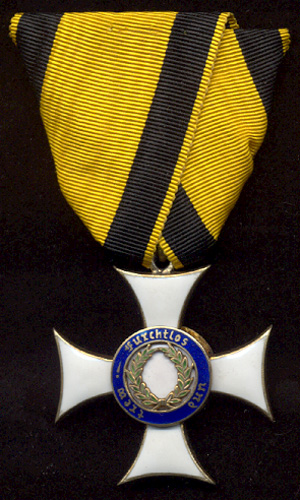
- Knight's Cross, obverse
- Type: Military order
- Awarded for: Bravery and exceptionally meritorious deeds in combat
- Description: White enameled cross pattée with a white-enameled center medallion ringed in blue enamel.
- Presented by: The Kingdom of Württemberg
- Eligibility: Württemberg military officers and officers of allied states
- Status: Obsolete
- Established: 11 February 1759 (as the Militär-Carls-Orden; renamed Militärverdienstorden on 11 November 1806)
- First award: 1799
- Final award: 1919

Highlights
- Total: Approximately 3,400 in all grades
- Ribbon of the order

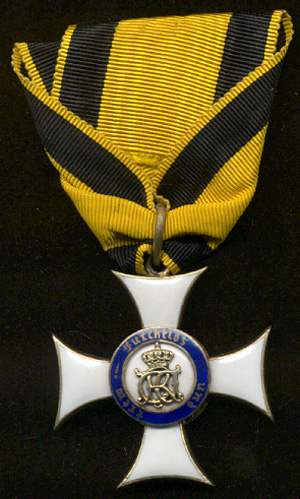
Knight's Cross, reverse

The Military Merit Order (Militärverdienstorden) was a military order of the Kingdom of Württemberg, which joined the German Empire in 1871. The order was one of the older military orders of the states of the German Empire. It was founded on 11 February 1759 by Karl Eugen, Duke of Württemberg as the Militär-Carls-Orden, and was renamed the Militärverdienstorden on 11 November 1806 by King Friedrich I. The order underwent several more revisions over the course of the 19th and early 20th centuries. It became obsolete with the fall of the Württemberg monarchy in the wake of Germany's defeat in World War I.

== Classes ==
The order came in three classes:

- Grand Cross (Großkreuz)
- Commander's Cross (Kommandeurkreuz) and
- Knight's Cross (Ritterkreuz).

Generally, the rank of the recipient determined which grade he would receive. Between 1799 and 1919, there were an estimated 95 awards of the Grand Cross, 214 of the Commander's Cross, and 3,128 of the Knight's Cross, with the bulk of these awards made in World War I; the numbers may only cover native Württembergers.

== Description ==
The badge of the order was a white-enameled gold cross pattée with curved arms and slightly concave edges. Around the white-enameled center medallion was a blue-enameled gold ring bearing on both sides the motto "Furchtlos und trew" ("Fearless and loyal"). On the obverse, the medallion bore a green-enameled gold laurel wreath. On the reverse, the medallion bore the monogram of the king of Württemberg at the time of award. The cross was the same size for the Grand Cross and the Commander's Cross, and slightly smaller for the Knight's Cross. The Grand Cross and Commander's Cross, and from 1870 the Knight's Cross, were topped with a crown. On 25 September 1914, the crown was removed from all grades.

The star of the order, awarded with the Grand Cross only, was a gold-rimmed silver eight-pointed star featuring the ringed medallion of the obverse of the cross.

The ribbon of the order was, until 1818 and after 1914, yellow with broad black stripes near each edge. After November 1917, when the ribbon was worn without the medal, the ribbon bore a green-enameled wreath to distinguish it from other Württemberg decorations on the same ribbon. The ribbon from 1818 to 1914 was blue.

== Notable recipients ==
=== Grand Crosses ===
- Duke Adam of Württemberg
- Albert of Saxony
- Albrecht, Duke of Württemberg
- Prince August of Württemberg
- Gebhard Leberecht von Blücher
- Leonhard Graf von Blumenthal
- Jérôme Bonaparte
- Julius von Bose
- Carl, Duke of Württemberg
- Prince Charles of Prussia
- Archduke Eugen of Austria
- Duke Eugen of Württemberg (1758–1822)
- Ferdinand I of Bulgaria
- Frederic von Franquemont
- Eduard von Fransecky
- Frederick Francis II, Grand Duke of Mecklenburg-Schwerin
- Frederick III, German Emperor
- Prince Friedrich Karl of Prussia (1828–1885)
- Prince Friedrich Leopold of Prussia
- Archduke Friedrich, Duke of Teschen
- George, King of Saxony
- Paul von Hindenburg
- Archduke John of Austria
- Georg von Kameke
- Hugo von Kirchbach
- Grand Duke Konstantin Pavlovich of Russia
- Duke Louis of Württemberg
- Ludwig III of Bavaria
- Edwin Freiherr von Manteuffel
- Jean Gabriel Marchand
- Grand Duke Michael Nikolaevich of Russia
- Helmuth von Moltke the Elder
- Nicholas I of Russia
- Grand Duke Nicholas Nikolaevich of Russia (1831–1891)
- Ivan Paskevich
- Philipp Albrecht, Duke of Württemberg
- Joseph Radetzky von Radetz
- Albrecht von Roon
- Rupprecht, Crown Prince of Bavaria
- Alfred von Schlieffen
- Albrecht von Stosch
- Wilhelm von Tümpling
- Nikita Volkonsky
- Alfred von Waldersee
- Arthur Wellesley, 1st Duke of Wellington
- August von Werder
- Wilhelm II, German Emperor
- William I of Württemberg
- William I, German Emperor
- William II of the Netherlands
- Duke William Frederick Philip of Württemberg
- Duke William of Württemberg
- Duke Eugen of Württemberg (1788–1857)
- Duke Ferdinand Frederick Augustus of Württemberg
- Ferdinand von Zeppelin
- Otto von Marchtaler

=== Commanders ===
- Duke Alexander of Württemberg (1771–1833)
- Prince Emil of Hesse
- Paul Bronsart von Schellendorff
- Max von Fabeck
- Friedrich Wilhelm von Bismarck
- Franz von Hipper
- Julius von Verdy du Vernois
- Wilhelm Karl, Duke of Urach

=== Knights ===
- Alexander II of Russia
- Gottlob Berger
- Oswald Boelcke
- Walter Braemer
- Wladyslaw Grzegorz Branicki
- Nikolaus zu Dohna-Schlodien
- Ernst I, Prince of Hohenlohe-Langenburg
- Friedrich Ehmann
- Gottfried Ehmann
- Otto Esswein
- Leo Geyr von Schweppenburg
- Wilhelm Groener
- Philip, Landgrave of Hesse-Homburg
- Paul Hocheisen
- Erich Ludendorff
- Max Ritter von Müller
- Karl August Nerger
- Grand Duke Nicholas Konstantinovich of Russia
- Prince Paul of Württemberg
- Manfred von Richthofen
- Erwin Rommel
- Reinhard Scheer
- Hugo Sperrle
- Jona von Ustinov
- Otto Weddigen
- William II of Württemberg
- Franz Graf von Wimpffen
- Duke Eugen of Württemberg (1846–1877)
