= Alan Wilkinson (RAF officer) =

British First World War flying ace

Alan Machin Wilkinson
- Born: 21 November 1891; Eastbourne, Sussex, England
- Died: June 1972 (aged 80); Maidstone, Kent, England
- Military career
- Allegiance: United Kingdom
- Branch: British Army; Royal Air Force
- Service years: 1914–1921; 1939–1944
- Rank: Lieutenant Colonel
- Units: No. 24 Squadron RFC; No. 48 Squadron RFC
- Commands: No. 23 Squadron RFC; RAF West Malling; RAF Martlesham Heath
- Conflicts: World War I • Western Front; World War II
- Awards: Distinguished Service Order & bar
- Other work: Company director

Lieutenant Colonel Alan Machin Wilkinson DSO* (21 November 1891 – June 1972) was a British First World War flying ace credited with nineteen aerial victories. He was one of only about 25 pilots twice awarded the DSO during the war, five of whom were also holders of the Victoria Cross.

== Early life and education ==
Wilkinson was born in Eastbourne, Sussex, the son of a civil engineer. He was educated at Repton School and Oriel College, Oxford, and briefly worked as a schoolmaster in Winchester.

== World War I ==
He was commissioned as a second lieutenant in the 9th (Cyclist) Battalion, Hampshire Regiment, on the outbreak on the war, and was promoted to lieutenant on 22 September 1914. Wilkinson then trained as a pilot, and was granted Royal Aero Club Aviator's Certificate No. 1398 after soloing a Maurice Farman biplane at the Military School at Farnborough on 4 July 1915. He was seconded to the Royal Flying Corps and appointed a flying officer on 8 September 1915.

Wilkinson was posted to No. 24 Squadron RFC, under the command of Major Lanoe Hawker, to fly the Airco DH.2 single-seat fighter, and was appointed a flight commander with the temporary rank of captain on 22 February 1916. He gained his first aerial victories early on 16 May 1916, driving down two enemy aircraft within half an hour. He accounted for two more on 17 June, and another the following day, to bring his score to five and making him an 'ace'. He drove down his sixth on 19 July, then another four between 21 and 31 August to bring his total to ten, making him the joint-highest scoring pilot in this aircraft along with Patrick Langan-Byrne. For at least some of the time Wilkinson had an additional Lewis gun fitted to his aircraft, DH.2 No.5966, known as "Wilkie's Bus", until ordered to remove it.

He was awarded the Distinguished Service Order, which was gazetted on 20 October 1916. his citation read:

Lieutenant (Temporary Captain) Alan Machin Wilkinson, Hampshire Regiment and Royal Flying Corps.

"For conspicuous gallantry and skill. He has shown great dash in attacking enemy machines, and, up to the end of August, he had accounted for five. On one occasion while fighting a hostile machine he was attacked from behind, but out-manoeuvred the enemy and shot him down. Finally he got back, his machine much damaged by machine gun fire."

Wilkinson also received a "mention in despatches" from General Sir Douglas Haig, Commander-in-Chief of the British Armies in France, on 13 November 1916. He was posted back to England and served as an instructor at the Central Flying School from 2 December 1916 until 12 January 1917, and also found time to marry Miss Lina Shell at St. Barnabas Church, Kensington, on 16 December 1916.

He then returned to France to serve in No. 48 Squadron RFC, flying the newly-introduced Bristol F.2a two-seater fighter. Despite heavy British losses during "Bloody April" Wilkinson gained further victories, driving down a fighter on 5 April, and on 9 April 1917 claimed six aircraft, though he was credited with only four. Another victory followed on the 12th, then two on the 13th, and finally his nineteenth and last on 22 April.

This brought him a bar to his Distinguished Service Order which was gazetted on 25 May 1917. His citation read:

Lieutenant (Temporary Captain) Alan Machin Wilkinson, DSO, Hampshire Regiment and Royal Flying Corps.

"For great skill and gallantry. He came down to a low altitude and destroyed a hostile scout which was attacking one of our machines, the pilot of which had been wounded, thereby saving it. In one day he shot down and destroyed six hostile machines. He has destroyed eight hostile machines during the past ten days and has displayed exceptional skill and gallantry in leading offensive patrols."

On 10 May 1917 Wilkinson was appointed a squadron commander with the temporary rank of major, and on 31 May he was promoted to captain. He served as the Officer Commanding of No. 23 Squadron RFC, flying the SPAD S.VII, until the end of August when he was hospitalised with appendicitis. He received his second "mention in despatches" on 11 December 1917, but soon afterwards was diagnosed with "neurasthenia" (today considered to be a form of combat stress reaction). He was appointed an acting lieutenant-colonel on 15 April 1918, and commanded one of the RAF's Schools of Aerial Fighting.

Wilkinson was transferred to the RAF's unemployed list on 26 April 1919. He eventually relinquished his commission as a captain in the Hampshire Regiment on 30 September 1921.

=== List of aerial victories ===
Combat record
No.	Date/Time	Aircraft/ Serial No.	Opponent	Result	Location	Notes
No. 24 Squadron RFC
1	16 May 1916 @ 0700–0730	DH.2 (5966)	AGO G.II	Out of control	Péronne	
2	16 May 1916 @ 0700–0730	DH.2 (5966)	Fokker E	Out of control	Péronne	
3	17 June 1916 @ 1825–1900	DH.2 (5966)	Fokker E	Destroyed	Miraumont	
4	17 June 1916 @ 1825–1900	DH.2 (5966)	Albatros C	Forced to land	Grévillers	
5	18 June 1916 @ 1950	DH.2 (5966)	C	Destroyed	South-east of Achiet-le-Grand	
6	19 July 1916 @ 1015	DH.2 (5966)	Fokker E	Out of control	Bapaume—Péronne Road	
7	21 August 1916	DH.2	C	Destroyed	Le Sars	Shared with Second Lieutenants Harry Wood and S. J. Sibley.
8	28 August 1916 @ 1840	DH.2 (7880)	Enemy Aircraft	Destroyed	Le Sars—Flers	
9	31 August 1916 @ 1100–1130	DH.2 (7880)	Roland C	Destroyed	Villers	
10	31 August 1916 @ 1100–1130	DH.2 (7880)	LVG C	Out of control	High Wood	
No. 48 Squadron RFC
11	5 April 1917 @ abt 1200	Bristol F.2a	Albatros D.III	Out of control	Douai	Observer: Lieutenant Laurence Allen
12	9 April 1917	Bristol F.2a	C	Destroyed	Lens	Observer: Lieutenant Hugh Griffith.
13	9 April 1917	Bristol F.2a	Albatros D.III	Out of control	Lens	Observer: Lieutenant Hugh Griffith.
14	9 April 1917	Bristol F.2a	Albatros D.III	Destroyed	Arras	Observer: Lieutenant Laurence Allen. Shared with Captain John Letts & Lieutenant H. G. Collins.
15	9 April 1917	Bristol F.2a	Albatros D.III	Out of control	Arras	Observer: Lieutenant Laurence Allen. Shared with Captain John Letts & Lieutenant H. G. Collins.
16	12 April 1917	Bristol F.2a	Albatros D.III	Out of control		Observer: Lieutenant Laurence Allen. Shared with Lieutenant William Winkler & Second Lieutenant Ernest Moore.
17	13 April 1917	Bristol F.2a	Albatros D.III	Destroyed	Vitry-en-Artois	Observer: Lieutenant Laurence Allen. Shared with Lieutenant J. W. Warren & Second Lieutenant Hugh Griffith
18	13 April 1917	Bristol F.2a	Albatros D.III	Out of control	Vitry-en-Artois	Observer: Lieutenant Laurence Allen. Shared with Lieutenant J. W. Warren & Second Lieutenant Hugh Griffith
19	22 April 1917	Bristol F.2a	Albatros D.III	Out of control		Observer: Lieutenant Laurence Allen

== Inter-war career ==
After the war Wilkinson worked in advertising, eventually becoming a director of the London Press Exchange in 1938.

== World War II ==
Wilkinson resumed his military career when granted a commission as a pilot officer on probation in the Administrative and Special Duties Branch of the Royal Air Force Volunteer Reserve on 28 February 1939. On 23 July he was confirmed in his appointment and promoted to flying officer. He received his third "mention in despatches" on 17 March 1941, by which time he was an acting squadron leader, and served as Officer Commanding RAF West Malling from March to June 1941, and of RAF Martlesham Heath from June 1941 to November 1942. Wilkinson resigned his commission on 4 August 1944, and was permitted to retain the rank of wing commander.

Wilkinson died in Maidstone, Kent in June 1972.
