= Patrick Anthony Langan-Byrne =

Irish flying ace (1895–1916)

Patrick Anthony Langan Byrne
- Born: 1895; Clogherhead, County Louth, Ireland, United Kingdom
- Died: 16 October 1916 (aged 20–21)
- Burial place: Arras Flying Services Memorial, Pas de Calais, France
- Military career
- Allegiance: United Kingdom
- Branch: British Army
- Service years: 1914–1916
- Rank: Second Lieutenant
- Units: 30th Brigade, RFA; No. 24 Squadron RFC
- Conflicts: World War I • Western Front
- Awards: Distinguished Service Order

Second Lieutenant Patrick Anthony Langan Byrne DSO (1895 – 16 October 1916) was an Irish flying ace of the First World War credited with ten aerial victories.

== Early life and education ==
Byrne was born in Clogherhead, County Louth, the son of Dr. and Mrs. J. V. Byrne. He was educated at Clongowes.

== World War I ==
Langan-Byrne was commissioned as a temporary second lieutenant in the Royal Field Artillery on 9 October 1914, serving in 129th Battery, 30th Brigade. He was later seconded to the Royal Flying Corps, in which he was appointed a flying officer on 4 August 1916.

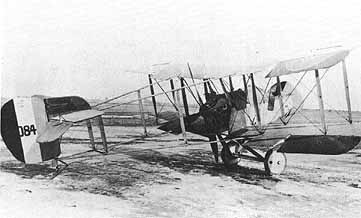
Langan-Byrne flew an Airco DH-2 such as this for all of his victories.

Langan-Byrne began his victories on 31 August 1916, when he used Airco DH.2 No. 6011 to force an enemy aircraft to land. Three days later, he drove a German fighter aircraft down out of control for his second win. On 15 September, he switched to DH.2 No. 7911 and shot down another German fighter in flames. The next day, Byrne destroyed a Fokker D.II. Then, between 21 and 28 September, he ran off a string of five "forced to land" victories. His being shot down by four Germans on 23 September did not seem to daunt him.

He was appointed a flight commander with the temporary rank of captain on 14 October just prior to his last victory on the morning of 16 October. That afternoon he was airborne for his second sortie of the day. He led "B" Flight right for Oswald Boelcke, commander of Jasta 2, who promptly killed him for the German ace's 34th victory. Langan-Byrne's grave site is unknown, though it is known he was buried. His Officer Commanding, Major Lanoe Hawker, lamented, "He was such a nice lad, as well as the best officer I have ever met." As a flying casualty of the Western Front with no known grave he is commemorated at the Arras Flying Services Memorial.

Having scored all of his 10 victories in the Airco DH.2, Byrne tied the record for most victories while flying that aircraft type, alongside Lieutenant Colonel Alan Wilkinson.

=== List of aerial victories ===
Combat record
No.	Date/Time	Aircraft/ Serial No.	Opponent	Result	Location
1	31 August 1916 @ c.1800	DH.2 (6010)	Enemy aircraft	Forced to land	North of Bapaume
2	2 September 1916 @ 1935	DH.2 (6010)	Single-seat fighter	Out of control	Beaulencourt
3	15 September 1916 @ 0830	DH.2 (7911)	Single-seat fighter	Destroyed in flames	North-east of Morval
4	16 September 1916 @ 1900	DH.2 (7911)	Fokker D.II	Destroyed	Achiet
5	21 September 1916 @ 1745	DH.2 (7911)	LVG two-seater	Forced to land	North of Miraumont
6	22 September 1916 @ 1140	DH.2 (7911)	Enemy aircraft	Forced to land	Vélu
7	22 September 1916 @ 1800	DH.2 (7911)	Rumpler two-seater	Forced to land	Grandcourt
8	23 September 1916 @ 0815	DH.2 (7911)	Rumpler two-seater	Forced to land	East of Combles
9	28 September 1916 @ 1710	DH.2 (A2538)	LVG two-seater	Forced to land	Rocquigny
10	16 October 1916 @ 1030	DH.2 (5925)	Albatros D.I	Forced to land	Biefvillers

== Honours and awards ==
Distinguished Service Order
Second Lieutenant Patrick Anthony Langan-Byrne, Royal Artillery and Royal Flying Corps.

"For conspicuous skill and gallantry. He has shown great pluck in attacking hostile machines, often against large odds. He has accounted for several. On one occasion, with two other machines, he attacked seventeen enemy machines, shot down one in flames and forced another to land."

== Bibliography ==
- Guttman, Jon (2009). Pusher Aces of World War I. Osprey aircraft of the aces. illustrated by Harry Dempsey. Oxford, UK: Osprey Publishing. ISBN 978-1-84603-417-6.
- Shores, Christopher; Franks, Norman & Guest, Russell (1990). Above the Trenches: A Complete Record of the Fighter Aces and Units of the British Empire Air Forces 1915-1920. London: Grub Street. ISBN 978-0-948817-19-9.
