= John Oliver Andrews =

English flying ace and Royal Air Force Air Vice-Marshal (1896-1989)

- Born: 20 July 1896; Waterloo, Lancashire, England
- Died: 29 May 1989 (aged 92)
- Military career
- Allegiance: United Kingdom
- Branch: British Army (1914–18); Royal Air Force (1918–45)
- Service years: 1914–45
- Rank: Air Vice Marshal
- Commands: No. 209 Squadron (1918); No. 220 Squadron (1918); No. 221 Squadron (1918–19); No. 1 Squadron (1920); RAF Mount Batten (1932–34); No. 12 (Fighter) Group (1942–43); No. 13 (Fighter) Group (1941–42)
- Conflicts: First World War; Russian Civil War; Second World War
- Awards: Companion of the Order of the Bath; Companion of the Distinguished Service Order; Military Cross & Bar

Air Vice Marshal John Oliver Andrews, CB, DSO, MC & Bar (20 July 1896 – 29 May 1989) was an English flying ace of the First World War and later a senior officer in the Royal Air Force. He was credited with twelve aerial victories. His most significant victory was over German ace Stefan Kirmaier, although he also enjoyed some success against Max Immelmann and Manfred von Richthofen. He continued his military career through the Second World War, rising into increasingly responsible staff positions during the interwar years, then successively commanding two fighter groups during the war. His career was capped by his admission into the Order of the Bath.

== Early life and service ==
John Oliver Andrews was a Manchester brewer's son. He attended Dame Alice Owen's School from 1908 to 1911, followed by attendance at Manchester High School from 1911 to 1912. He joined The Royal Scots (Lothian Regiment), being commissioned a second lieutenant on 9 October 1914.

== Aerial service in the First World War ==
=== 1914–1915 ===
After service in the infantry, Andrews transferred to the Royal Flying Corps. His first aerial service was as an observer/gunner; originally, he was seconded to No. 1 Squadron RFC at Netheravon on 4 November 1914. He was then reassigned to observe on the Avro 504 in No. 5 Squadron RFC in June 1915. He qualified as a pilot on 15 October 1915, earning Royal Aero Club certificate number 1924 at Le Crotoy, France; on the 21st, he was officially appointed a flying officer (Observer). He was then assigned to the newly formed No. 24 Squadron RFC as an Airco DH.2 pilot. On 16 December 1915, he was appointed a Flying Officer.

=== 1916 ===
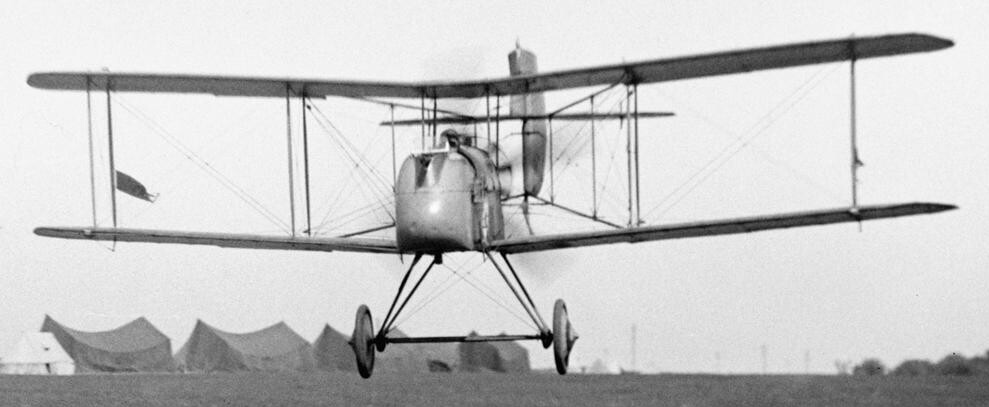
An early model DH.2 fighter taking off from an airfield in France

On 27 April 1916, during one of his early flights in a DH.2, he drove off German ace Max Immelmann, holing his Fokker Eindecker in the process. A week later, Andrews was appointed a Flight Commander with a concomitant promotion to temporary captain. He went on to score his initial victory on 21 July 1916, destroying a Fokker Eindecker over Allaines. On that day, he led a patrol attacking a German formation of five Roland C.IIs and their five escorting Fokkers. His victory may have been against German ace Leutnant Otto Parschau of FA 32.

Andrews then scored sporadically until he tallied his seventh win—and his last with 24 Squadron—on 22 November 1916 when he shot down German double ace Stefan Kirmaier, Staffelführer of Jasta 2. The following day he was one of the combatants in the dogfight in which Manfred von Richthofen downed Andrews' CO, Major Lanoe Hawker. Andrews, the patrol leader, was unable to aid Hawker because Andrews' aircraft's engine had been stopped by German bullets.

=== 1917 ===
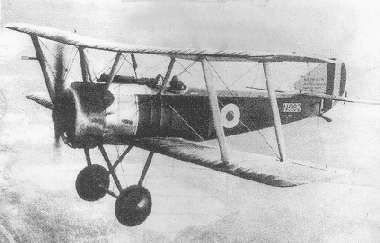
A Sopwith Pup fighter in flight.

Andrews would not score again until after his transfer to No. 66 Squadron RFC flying Sopwith Pups. He brought down his eighth victim, an Albatros two-seater, on 30 April 1917. By 11 July he had run his total to twelve. By now, he had destroyed eight enemy airplanes (including one shared with Lieutenant Robert Saundby), driven down three others out of control, as well as killed Kirmaier and captured his Albatros D.II.

On 1 July he had been promoted to lieutenant. In the following month he was rested from combat and transferred to No. No. 11 Training Squadron RFC at Scampton aerodrome as an instructor.

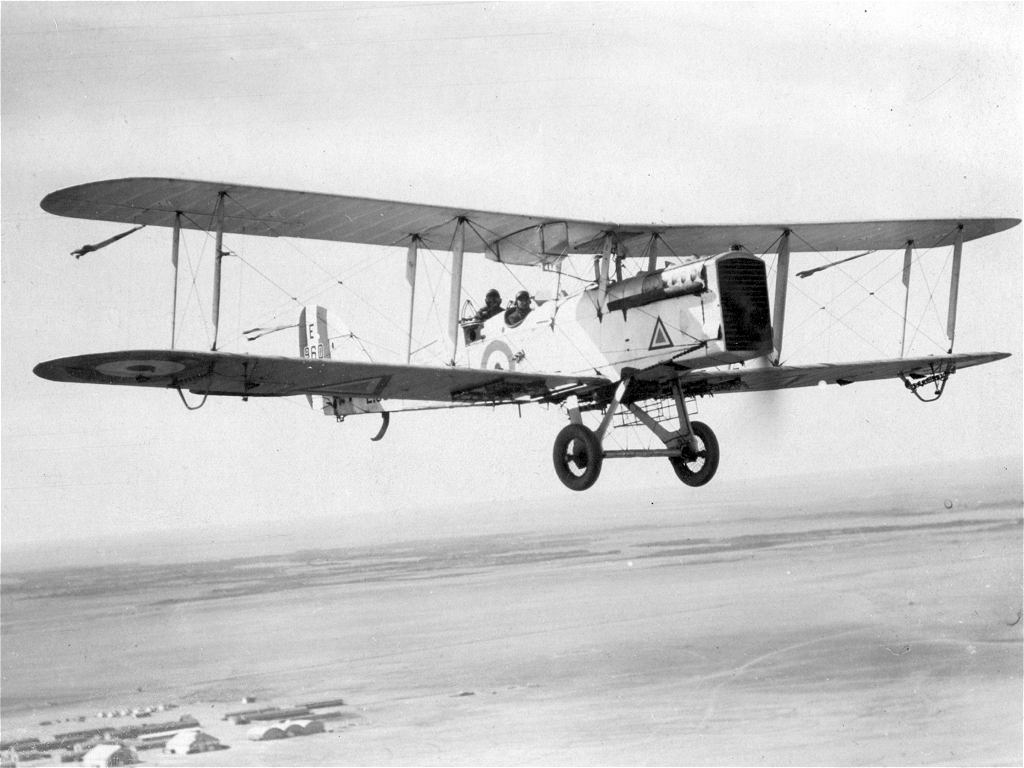
An Airco DH.9A bomber such as Andrews flew in Russia.

=== 1918 ===
In March 1918 Andrews returned to the front, assigned to No. 70 Squadron RFC as a Flight Commander. On 1 April 1918, the first day of the brand new Royal Air Force, Andrews was promoted to Captain. On 7 May 1918 he became Officer Commanding of a Sopwith Camel unit, No. 209 Squadron RAF, as temporary Major. In October he switched to command of No. 220 Squadron RAF. On 20 December 1918 he switched command to No. 221 Squadron RAF, being tasked to operate Airco DH.9s in southern Russia.

== Between the World Wars ==
Andrews led 221 Squadron in operations supporting the Russian White Army in their counter-revolution against the Bolsheviks in 1919. On 1 August 1919 he was granted a permanent commission as a flight lieutenant in the Royal Air Force. After a further spell of foreign service in India he returned to Britain to begin attendance at Cambridge University on 1 September 1920.

Andrews' interwar years saw him also attending London University, the RAF Staff College and the Imperial Defence College, as well as qualifying as a First Class German Interpreter. Interspersed with these educational stints were a variety of staff and technical assignments. Promotions came with his increased seniority and professional education. He rose to squadron leader on 1 July 1924 and eight years later became a wing commander. On 1 July 1937 he was promoted to group captain.

== Second World War and beyond ==
Andrews was promoted to air commodore on 1 September 1939, coincident with the beginning of the Second World War. In early 1940 he became Director of Armament Development for the RAF. He was appointed an acting air vice marshal on 1 November 1940. On 18 November 1940 he was assigned as Assistant Chief of the Air Staff (Operational Requirements and Tactics). He became a temporary air vice marshal on 10 January 1941. On 4 February, he was given command of No. 13 (Fighter) Group, Fighter Command. He was an air vice marshal by April 1942. On 29 November 1942 he transferred to command of No. 12 (Fighter) Group. On 5 July 1943 he was transferred to Headquarters Flying Training Command.

Air Vice Marshal Andrews retired on 17 April 1945. He died on 29 May 1989 in Windsor and Maidenhead.

== Honours and awards ==
Military Cross (MC), gazetted 20 October 1916

"2nd Lt. (temp. Capt.) John Oliver Andrews, R. Scots and R.F.C.
For conspicuous gallantry and skill. He is a fine leader of offensive patrols, and has himself shot down four enemy machines. On one occasion he got within 25 yards of an enemy machine under heavy fire and brought it down a wreck."

Bar to Military Cross, gazetted 11 December 1916

"2nd Lt. (Temp Capt.) John Oliver Andrews, M.C., R. Scots and R.F.C.
For conspicuous gallantry in action. He showed great courage and determination in leading successful patrols and attacks on hostile aircraft, and has now accounted for his ninth machine. On one occasion he followed a machine down to 800 feet, on another he went down to 500 feet."

Companion of the Distinguished Service Order, gazetted 26 July 1917

"2nd Lt. (temp. Capt.) John Oliver Andrews, M.C., R. Scots. & R.F.C.
For conspicuous gallantry and devotion to duty in leading offensive patrols with great dash and success on over thirty occasions, and taking part in over twenty-two combats. His skill and courage in attacking and destroying hostile aircraft have at all times been magnificent."

RUSI Essay Gold Medalist for 1932.

Companion of The Most Honourable Order of the Bath, appointed 11 June 1942.

== Bibliography ==
- Guttman, Jon (2009). Pusher Aces of World War 1. Osprey Publishing Co. ISBN 978-1-84603-417-6.
- Shores, Christopher; Franks, Norman; Guest, Russell (1990). Above the Trenches: A Complete Record of the Fighter Aces and Units of the British Empire Air Forces 1915–1920. Grub Street. ISBN 978-0-948817-19-9.
- van Wyngarden, Greg (2006). Early German Aces of World War I. Osprey Publishing Co. ISBN 978-1-84176-997-4.

Military offices
Preceded by Richard Saul	AOC No. 12 Group; 1942–1943	Succeeded by Roderic Hill
Preceded by Richard Saul	AOC No. 13 Group; 1941–1942	Succeeded by Malcolm Henderson
