= Airco DH.2 =

1915 fighter aircraft by Airco

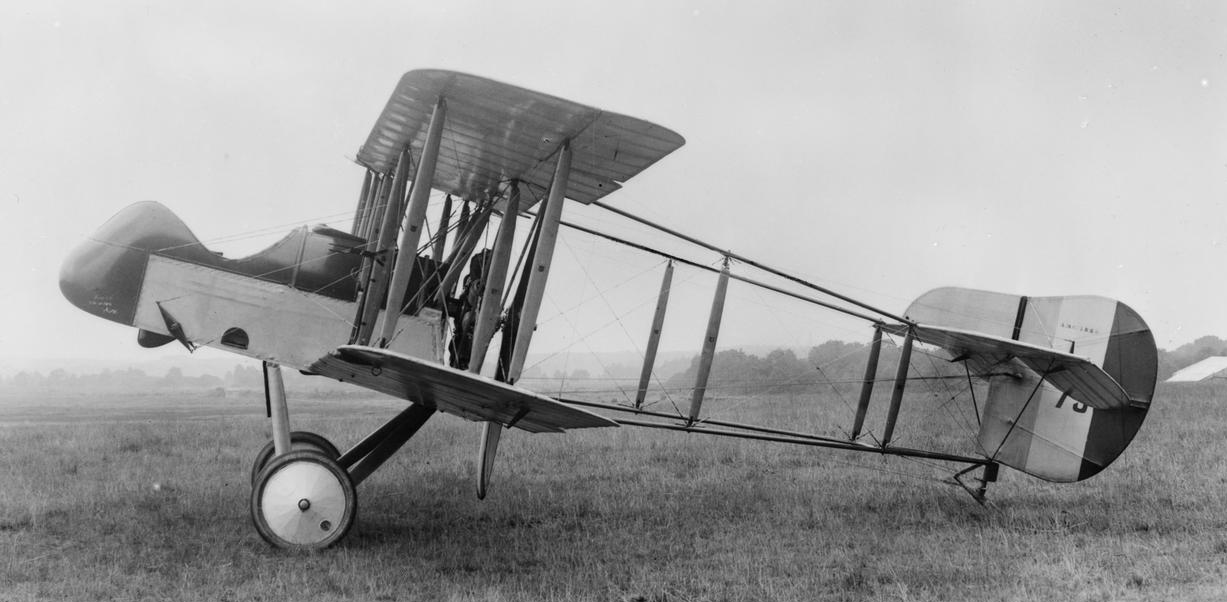

General information
- Type: Fighter
- Manufacturer: Airco
- Designer: Geoffrey de Havilland
- Primary user: Royal Flying Corps
- Number built: 453

History
- First flight: July 1915
- Retired: 1918
- Developed from: Airco DH.1

The Airco DH.2 was a single-seat pusher biplane fighter aircraft which operated during the First World War. It was the second pusher design by aeronautical engineer Geoffrey de Havilland for Airco, based on his earlier DH.1 two-seater.

The development of pusher configuration fighters, such as the DH.2 and the F.E.2b enabled forward firing armament before the development of synchronisation gears such as that fitted to the German Fokker Eindecker monoplane fighter. The prototype DH.2 made its first flight in July 1915, but it was lost during the following month, on its service trials on the Western Front.

The DH.2 was introduced to frontline service in February 1916 and became the first effectively armed British single-seat fighter. It enabled Royal Flying Corps (RFC) pilots to counter the "Fokker Scourge" that had given the Germans the advantage during late 1915. It served in fighting and escort duties for almost two years, while numerous pilots became flying aces using the type. It became outclassed by newer German fighters, resulting in the DH.2's eventual withdrawal from first line service in France after RFC units completed the process of re-equipping with newer fighters, such as the Nieuport 17 and Airco DH.5, in June 1917.

== Development ==
By the outbreak of the First World War, aeronautical engineer Geoffrey de Havilland was already an experienced aircraft designer, having been responsible for the experimental Royal Aircraft Factory F.E.1, Royal Aircraft Factory F.E.2 and Blériot Scout B.S.1, the B.S.1 being the fastest British aircraft of its day. In June 1914, de Havilland left the Royal Aircraft Factory for Airco, where he continued work on his own designs, the first being the Airco DH.1, which followed a similar formula to that of the F.E.2.

Early air combat over the Western Front indicated the need for a single-seat fighter with a forward-firing machine gun. At this point in time, there was no dominant approach to arming fighters, but a pusher configuration was one answer. As no means of firing forward through the propeller of a tractor aeroplane was yet available to the British, Geoffrey de Havilland designed the DH.2 as a scaled-down, single-seat development of the earlier two-seat DH.1. Aviation author J.M Bruce speculated that, had adequate synchronisation gear been available, de Havilland may have been less likely to pursue a pusher configuration.

While it is popularly viewed as a response to the emergence of Germany's Fokker Eindecker monoplane fighters, its development was not specifically targeted at the type, having commenced prior to the Eindecker's arrival. The first prototype DH.2 performed its first flight in July 1915. Following the completion of its manufacturing trials, on 26 July 1915, the prototype was dispatched to France for operational evaluation, but was lost over the Western Front and was captured by the Germans.

Despite the prototype's premature loss, the DH.2 was ordered into quantity manufacture. The production aircraft was generally similar to the prototype with the only major alterations being a fuel system and a revised gun mounting arrangement. Deliveries of the DH.2 commenced during the latter half of 1915 and a handful of aircraft were reportedly operating in France prior to the year's end. A total of 453 DH.2s were produced by Airco.

== Design ==
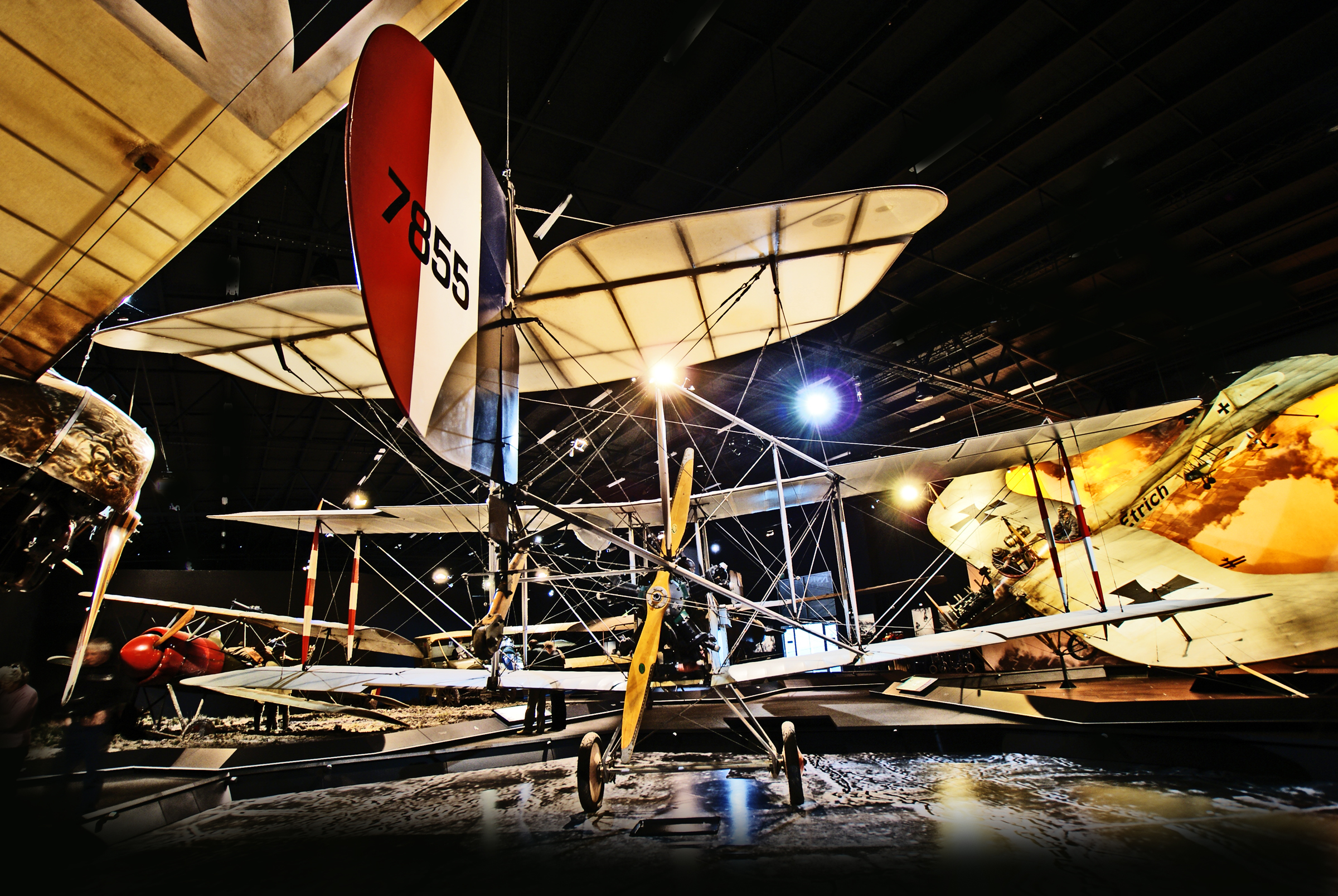
Rear view of a reproduction DH.2

The Airco DH.2 was a compact two-bay pusher biplane fighter aircraft. It had a wooden airframe, which was wire-braced and covered by fabric across most areas, except for the nacelle nose and upper decking. Both the upper and lower wings had ailerons fitted. The upper ailerons were spring-loaded to automatically return to a neutral position when the controls were released. The upper part of the nose of the nacelle was cut away so that a machine gun could be mounted there. Unusually, the windshield was mounted on the machine gun rather than to the airframe.

The DH.2 was armed with a single .303 in (7.7 mm) Lewis gun which was mounted on a flexible mount. Once pilots learned that the best method of achieving a victory was to aim the aircraft rather than the gun, it was fixed to fire forward, although this was met with skepticism by higher authorities until a quick-release clip was devised at the Squadron level. The clip was devised by Major Lanoe Hawker, who also improved the gunsights and added a ring sight and an "aiming off model" that helped the gunner allow for leading a target.

The majority of DH.2s were powered by the 100 hp (75 kW) Gnôme Monosoupape nine-cylinder, air-cooled rotary engine, however later models received the similarly configured but much improved 110 hp (82 kW) Le Rhône 9J engine. Some sources state that the Monosoupape was retained in the DH.2 design despite a tendency to shed cylinders midair and a single DH.2 was fitted experimentally with a Le Rhône 9J. In addition to the variety of engines used, the fuel system also differed between individual aircraft. Typically, a gravity-fed fuel tank was used, but it could be located on the upper wing central section, or either above or below the port side upper wing.

== Operational service ==
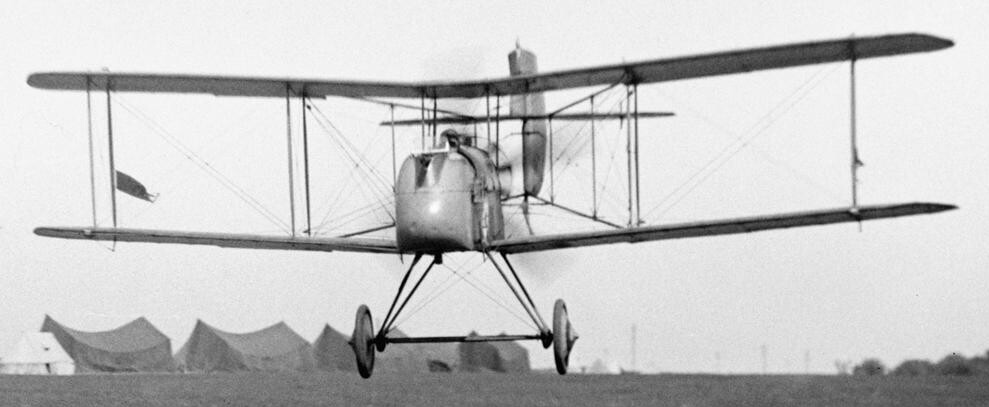
Early DH.2 taking off from airfield at Beauvel, France

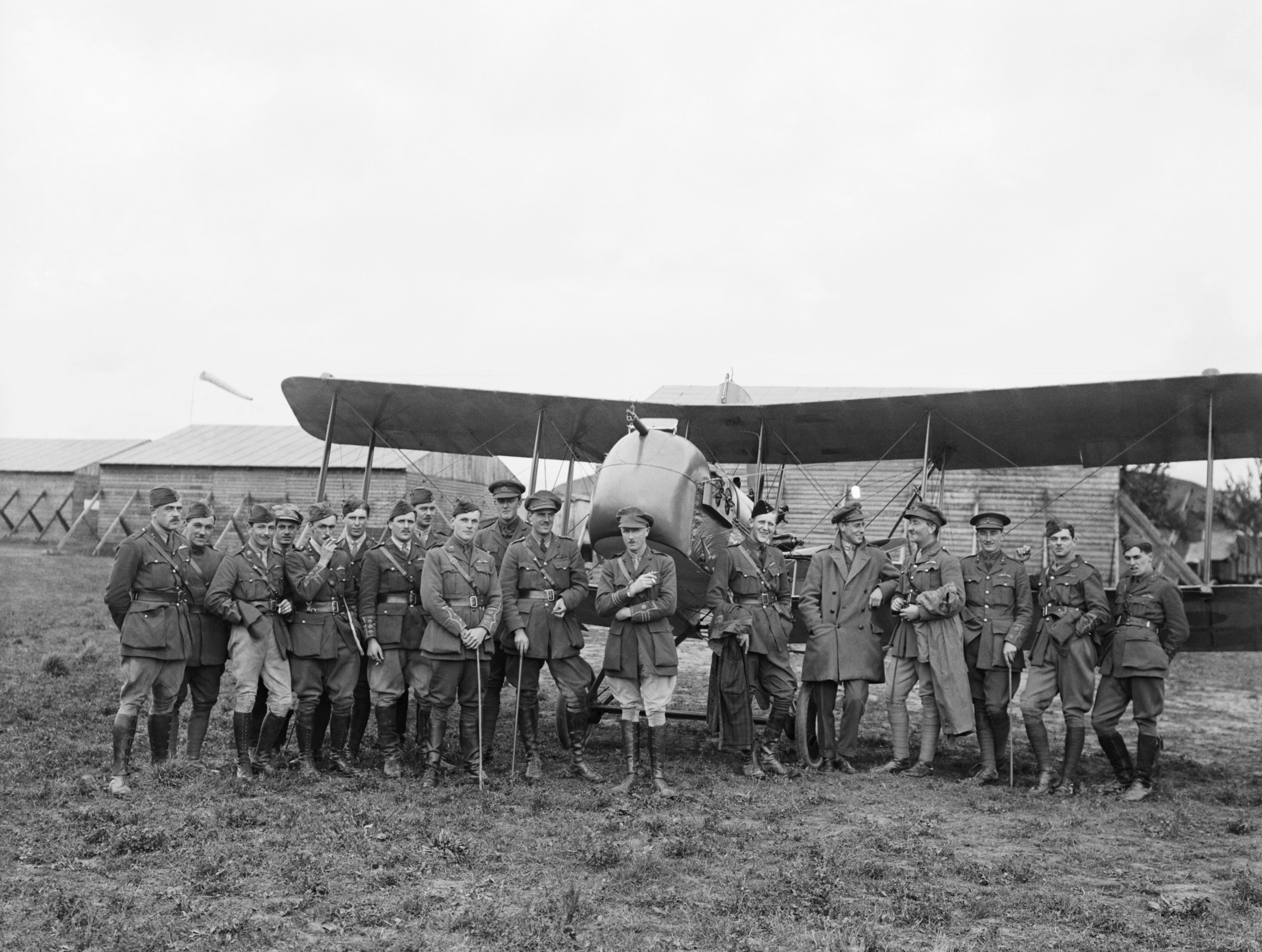
32 Squadron RFC personnel, in front of a DH.2 at Beauval, 1916

After evaluation at Hendon on 22 June 1915, the first DH.2 arrived in France for operational trials with No. 5 RFC Squadron but was shot down and its pilot killed during early August 1915. This aircraft was recovered and repaired by the Germans. The first squadron equipped with the DH.2, and the first RFC squadron completely equipped with single-seat fighters, No. 24 Squadron RFC, arrived in France early February 1916.

The DH.2 eventually equipped seven fighter squadrons on the Western Front and proved more than a match for the Fokker Eindecker and the first DH.2 victory over an Eindecker may have been on 2 April 1916. DH.2s were heavily involved in the Battle of the Somme with No. 24 Squadron engaging in 774 combats and claiming 44 enemy machines. Service training for pilots in the RFC was poor, and the DH.2 initially had a high accident rate, supposedly gaining the nickname "The Spinning Incinerator", but as familiarity with the type improved, it was recognised as being maneuverable and relatively easy to fly.

The limited ammunition supply of the original gun installation proved to be inadequate. Although officially discouraged, pilots experimented with different gun arrangements, including a fixed twin-gun configuration. Furthermore, the original gun mounting was criticised for being loose and unstable, and it obstructed the stick when elevated. DH.2s were routinely flown with the guns fixed into position.

The arrival at the front of more powerful German tractor biplane fighters such as the Halberstadt D.II and the Albatros D.I, in late 1916, meant that the DH.2 was outclassed in turn. It remained in first line service until June 1917 in France, until No. 24 and No. 32 Squadron RFC reequipped with Airco DH.5s, and a few remained in service in Macedonia including "A" Flight of No. 47 Squadron and a joint R.F.C. / R.N.A.S. fighter squadron, and with "X" Flight, in Palestine until late 1917. By then, it was dangerously obsolete as a fighter. The DH.2 was then used as an advanced trainer and for other secondary tasks, with the last recorded use of a DH.2 being a single example flying at RAF Turnhouse in January 1919.

=== Ace pilots ===
Distinguished pilots of the DH.2 included Victoria Cross recipient Lanoe Hawker (seven victories, though none in the DH.2), who was the first commander of No. 24 Squadron. The commander of No. 32 Squadron, Lionel Rees was awarded the Victoria Cross after flying the DH.2 for a solo attack on a formation of ten German two-seaters on 1 July 1916, destroying two. James McCudden became an ace in DH.2s and would become the British Empire's fourth-ranking ace of the war. German ace and tactician Oswald Boelcke was killed during a dogfight with No. 24 Squadron DH.2s due to a collision with one of his own wingmen. Fourteen aces scored five or more aerial victories using the DH.2 and many also went on to further success in later types. Eight pilots scored all of their victories in the DH.2, including Harry Wood, Sidney Cowan, Hubert Jones, William Curphey, Maxmillian Mare-Montembault, Patrick Anthony Langan-Byrne, Eric Pashley and Selden Long. Lanoe George Hawker V.C., D.S.O., and commanding officer of No. 24 Squadron flying a DH.2 was shot down by Manfred von Richthofen flying an Albatros D.II.

DH.2 aces
Pilot	victories
Patrick Anthony Langan-Byrne	10
Alan Wilkinson	10
Selden Long	9
Arthur Gerald Knight	8
Eric C. Pashley	8
John Oliver Andrews	7
Sidney Cowan	7
Hubert Jones	7
William Curphey	6
Stanley Cockerell	5
Henry Evans	5
James McCudden	5
Robert Saundby	5
Harry Wood	5

== Reproductions ==
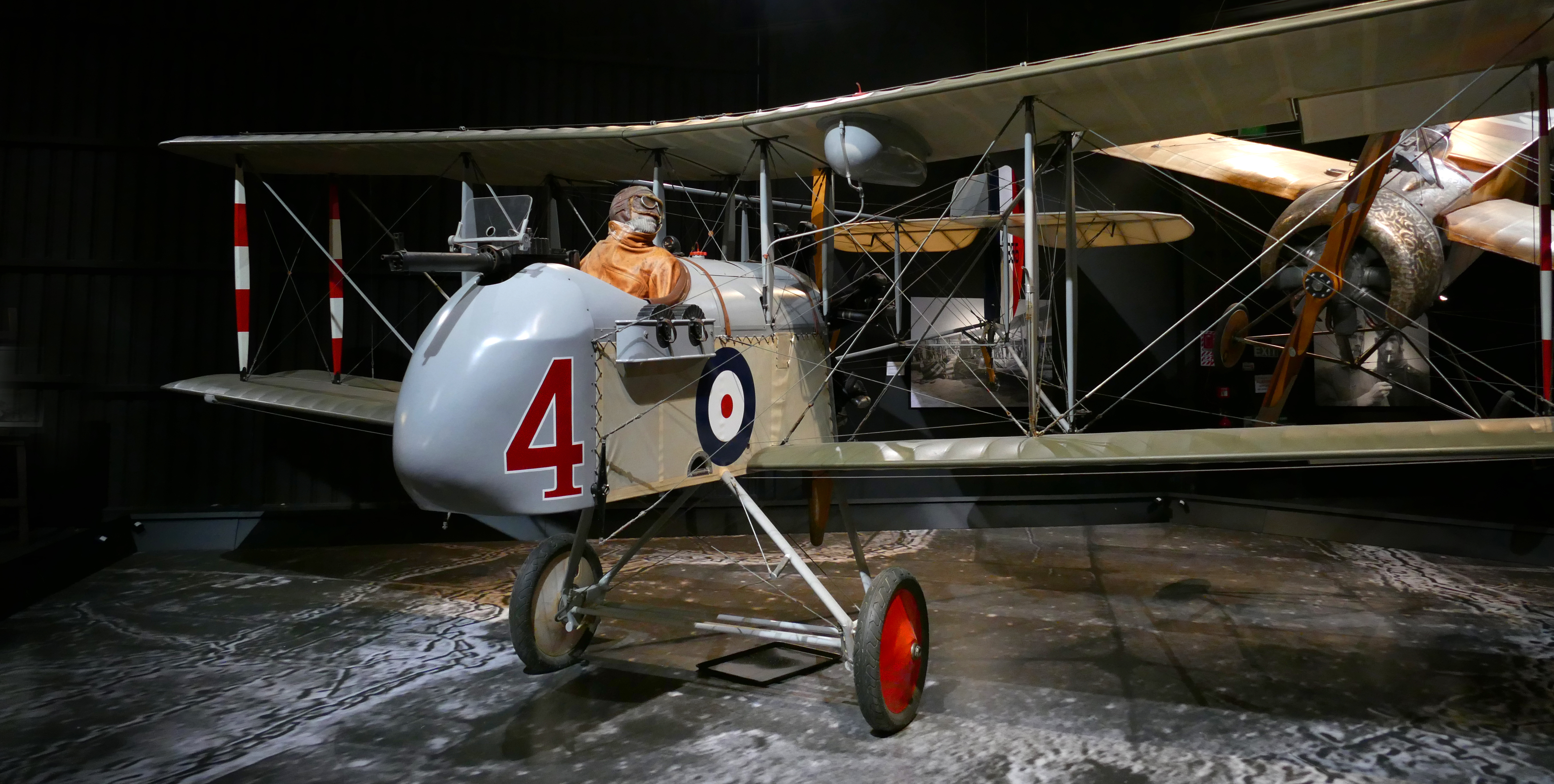
DH.2 Reproduction on display at the Omaka Aviation Heritage Centre

No original DH.2s exist. In 1970, Walter M. Redfern from Seattle, Washington built a replica DH.2 called the Redfern DH-2, powered by a Kinner 125–150 hp (93–112 kW) engine. Redfern subsequently sold plans to home builders, and several of these replicas are flying. Redfern's original replica is now displayed at the Omaka Aviation Heritage Centre in Blenheim, New Zealand.

== Operators ==
United Kingdom

- Royal Flying Corps (Most units operated the DH.2 alongside other types)
  - No. 5 Squadron RFC
  - No. 11 Squadron RFC
  - No. 17 Squadron RFC
  - No. 18 Squadron RFC
  - No. 24 Squadron RFC
  - No. 29 Squadron RFC
  - No. 32 Squadron RFC
  - No. 41 Squadron RFC
  - No. 47 Squadron RFC
  - No. 111 Squadron RFC

== Specifications (DH.2) ==
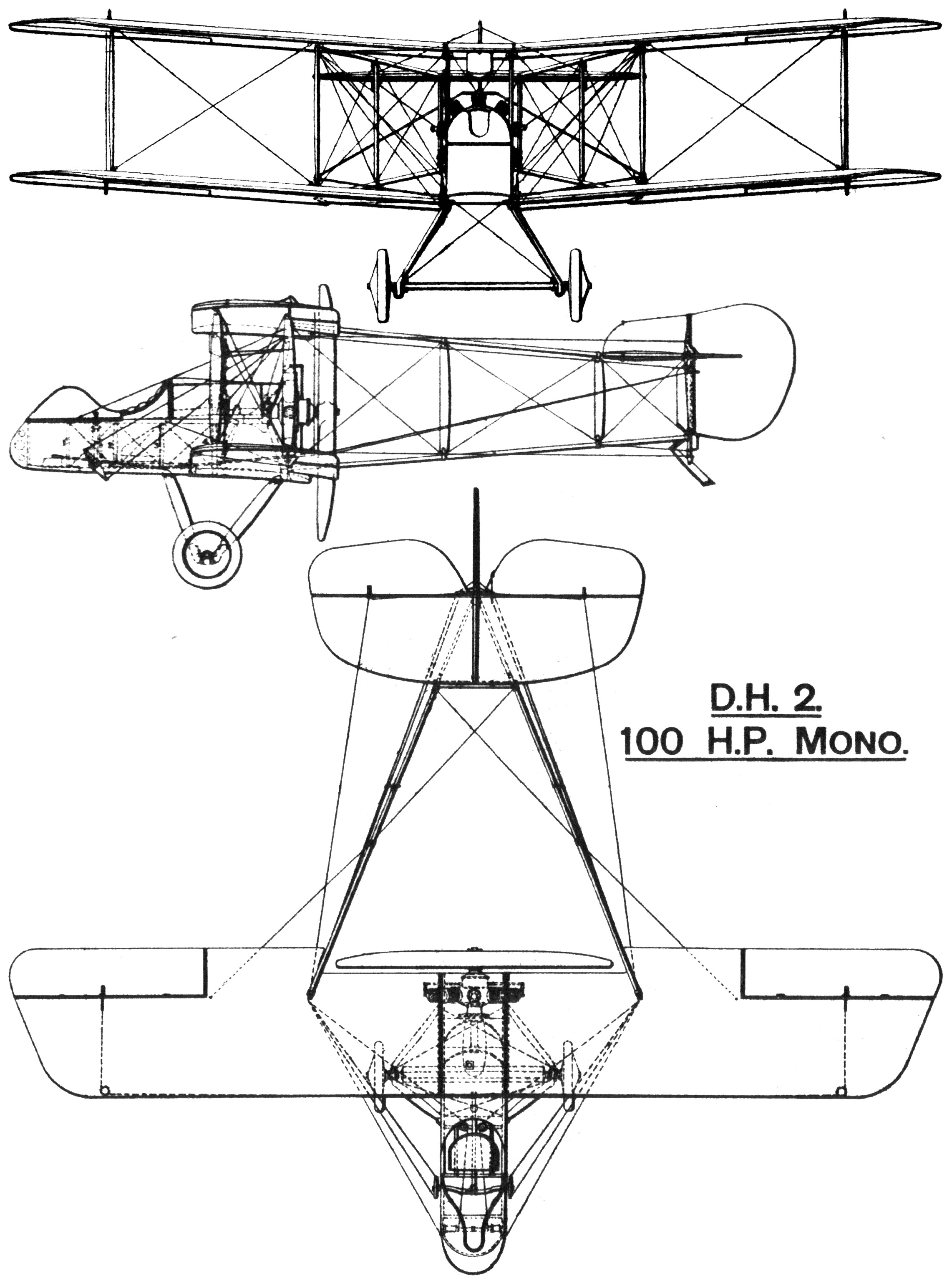
Airco DH.2 drawing

Data from Warplanes of the First World War - Fighters Volume One,

General characteristics

- Crew: 1
- Length: 25 ft 2 1/2 in (7.684 m)
- Wingspan: 28 ft 3 in (8.61 m)
- Height: 9 ft 6 1/2 in (2.908 m)
- Wing area: 249 sq ft (23.1 m^{2})
- Empty weight: 943 lb (428 kg)
- Gross weight: 1,441 lb (654 kg)
- Powerplant: 1 × Gnôme Monosoupape 9-cylinder rotary engine, 100 hp (75 kW)
- Propellers: 2-bladed Integral DG 70 fixed pitch wooden propeller

Performance

- Maximum speed: 93 mph (150 km/h, 81 kn) at sea level
- Endurance: 2 hours, 45 minutes
- Service ceiling: 14,000 ft (4,300 m)
- Time to altitude: 24 minutes, 45 seconds to 10,000 ft (3,000 m)

Armament

- Guns: 1 × .303 in (7.7 mm) Lewis gun
- Rockets: Two examples were equipped with Le Prieur rockets for attacking observation balloons

== See also ==
- Nieuport 10
- Nieuport 11
- Nieuport 16

Related development

- Airco DH.1
- Redfern DH-2 (replica)

Aircraft of comparable role, configuration, and era

- Avro 508
- Port Victoria P.V.4
- Royal Aircraft Factory F.E.2
- Royal Aircraft Factory F.E.8
- Vickers F.B.5
- Vickers F.B.12

Related lists

- List of aircraft of the Royal Flying Corps
- List of fighter aircraft
