= Henry Evans (RFC officer) =

Canadian military officer (1880–1916)

Henry Cope Evans
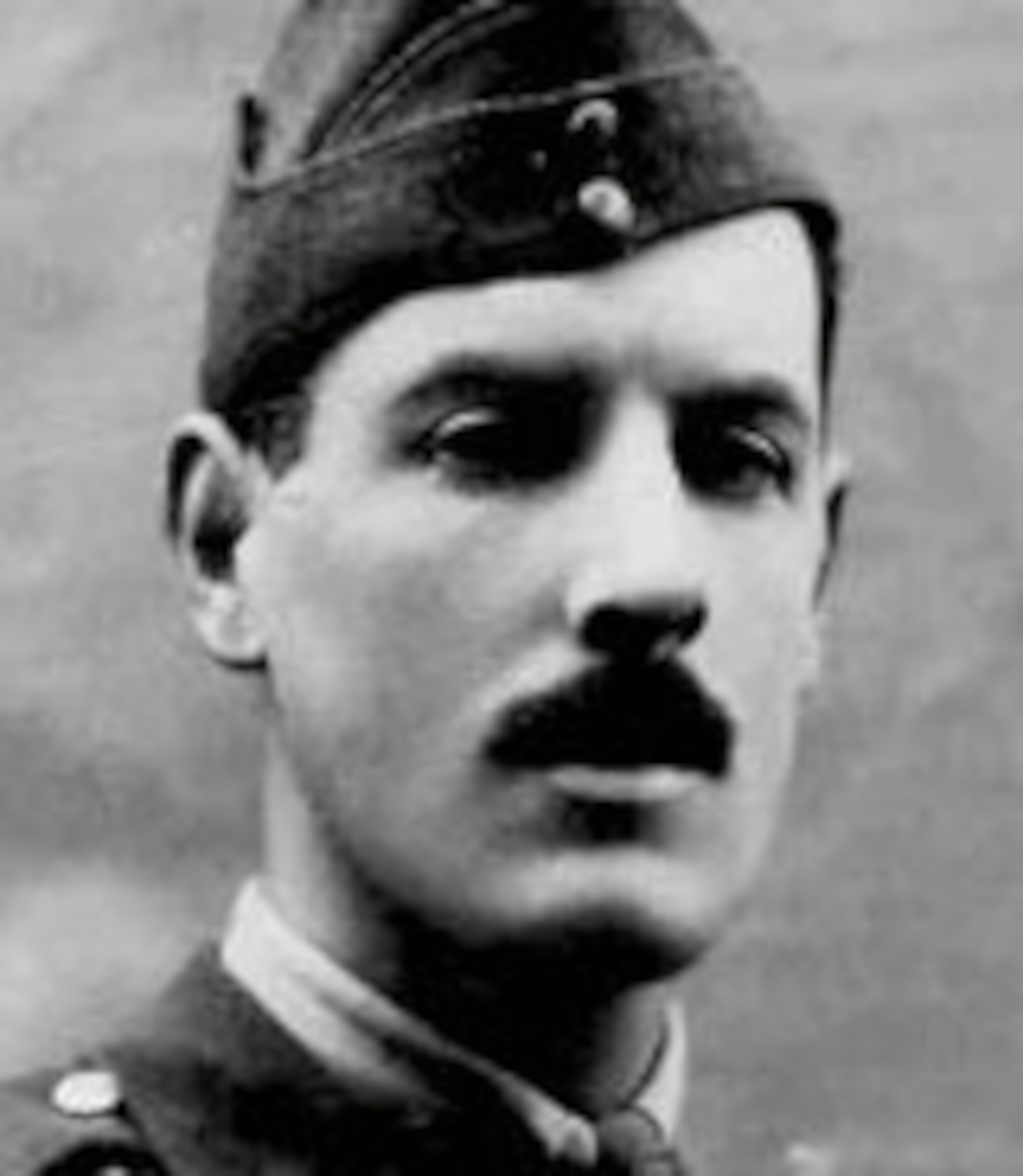
- Born: 26 July 1880; London, England
- Died: 3 September 1916 (aged 36); Northern France
- Burial place: Arras Flying Services Memorial, Pas de Calais, France
- Military career
- Allegiance: Canada; United Kingdom
- Branch: Royal Regiment of Canadian Artillery; Canadian Expeditionary Force; Royal Flying Corps
- Service years: 1900–1901; 1914–1917
- Rank: Second lieutenant
- Units: "C" Battery, Canadian Field Artillery; 19th Alberta Dragoons; No. 24 Squadron RFC
- Conflicts: Second Boer War; World War I
- Awards: Distinguished Service Order

Second Lieutenant Henry Cope Evans DSO (26 July 1880 – 3 September 1916) was a World War I flying ace credited with five aerial victories, all gained while flying the Airco DH.2.

== Biography ==
Evans was the only son of W. H. and Alice M. Evans of West Point, Camberley, Surrey, and was educated at Woodcote House School, Windlesham, and Haileybury. As a young man Evans emigrated to Ontario to learn fruit farming. He enlisted in the Royal Regiment of Canadian Artillery during the Second Boer War, and served in South Africa for a year as part of "C" Battery. On returning to Canada he took up ranching near Macleod, Alberta, and also held a Government appointment as Range Rider. A keen sportsman and horseman, he was well known as a polo player, and was one of the early pioneers of the game in Western Canada.

On 23 September 1914 at Valcartier, Quebec, he enlisted as a trooper in the 19th Alberta Dragoons, arriving in England with the 1st Canadian Contingent in November 1914. He served with the Dragoons in France from February until September 1915, was promoted to the rank of sergeant and was badly affected by poison gas.

He was transferred to the Royal Flying Corps and commissioned as a temporary second lieutenant on 13 September 1915, and on 25 September joined No. 24 Squadron RAF in action at the front, not being officially gazetted as a flying officer (observer) until 22 November.

Evans was posted to Home Establishment on 26 January 1916 for pilot training, being appointed a flying officer on 15 May, and being granted the Royal Aero Club Aviator's Certificate No. 2603, after flying a Maurice Farman biplane at the Military Flying School, Farnborough, on 23 May.

He re-joined 24 Squadron on 4 July 1916, gaining his first victory on 20 July, driving a Roland C.II down out of control over Fleurs, and the next day he destroyed another enemy aircraft over Combles. Between 6 and 9 August he destroyed a further three enemy aircraft, gaining the five confirmed victories needed for flying ace status. Evans was shot down and killed by German anti-aircraft fire on 3 September 1916 while on a morning offensive patrol over the British Fourth Army front.

He was listed as "missing" by the War Office, and as his remains were never recovered he is commemorated at the Arras Flying Services Memorial.

== Honours and awards ==
Both of Evans' awards were gazetted posthumously, on 22 September 1916 and 2 January 1917 (dated 13 November 1916), respectively.

Distinguished Service Order
Temporary Second Lieutenant Henry Cope Evans, General List, attached Royal Flying Corps.
For conspicuous gallantry and skill on many occasions in attacking hostile aircraft, frequently against large odds. In one fortnight he brought down 4 enemy machines, returning on one occasion with his machine badly damaged.

Mention in Dispatches

In a long list of officers noted by General Sir Douglas Haig, Commander-in-Chief of the British Armies in France.
