= Lanoe Hawker =

British fighter pilot in World War I (1890-1916)

Lanoe George Hawker
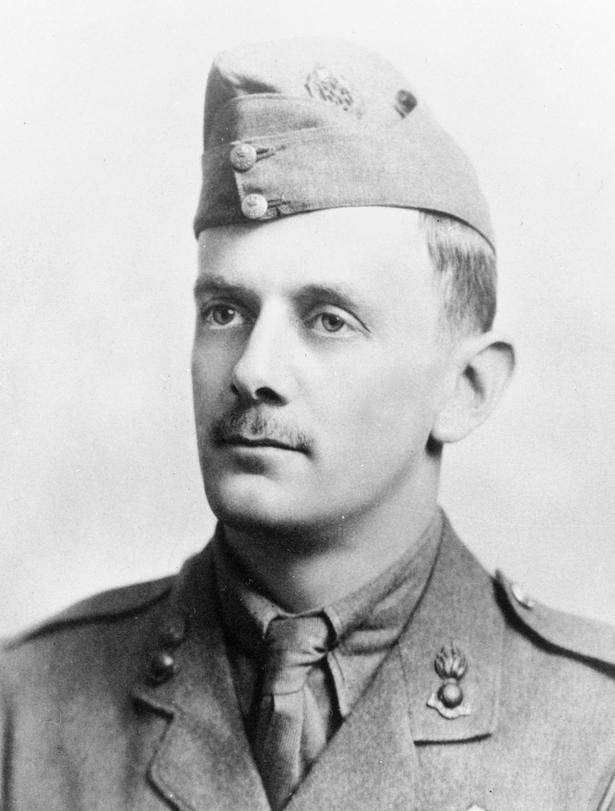
- Lanoe Hawker c. 1915
- Born: 30 December 1890; Longparish, Hampshire, England, United Kingdom
- Died: 23 November 1916 (aged 25) near Bapaume, France during a dogfight with Manfred von Richthofen
- Military career
- Allegiance: United Kingdom
- Branch: British Army
- Service years: 1910–1916
- Rank: Major
- Units: Royal Engineers; Royal Flying Corps
- Commands: No. 24 Squadron RFC
- Conflicts: First World War: Western Front
- Awards: Victoria Cross; Distinguished Service Order; Mentioned in Despatches

Lanoe George Hawker, VC, DSO (30 December 1890 – 23 November 1916) was a British flying ace of the First World War. Having seven credited victories, he was the third pilot to receive the Victoria Cross, the highest decoration for gallantry awarded to British and Commonwealth servicemen.

Hawker was an excellent tactician, who instituted many important changes in the Royal Flying Corps in 1915 and 1916. His brilliance was soon recognized and he was given command of the first British single-seat fighter outfit, 24 Squadron. An aerobatic flyer and leader, he was killed in a dogfight with the German pilot Manfred von Richthofen on November 23, 1916. The dogfight was one of the most celebrated air duels of the war, and made Richthofen a household name.

== Early life ==
Hawker was born on 30 December 1890 at Longparish, Hampshire, England, to Lieutenant Henry Colley Hawker, R.N., and Julia Gordon Lanoe Hawker, daughter of Major Peter William Lanoe Hawker, of the 74th Highlanders and sister of the author Mary Elizabeth Hawker ("Lanoe Falconer"). His parents were distant cousins; Hawker's father was of a cadet branch of the family resident in Australia since his own father, George Charles Hawker (son of Royal Navy Admiral Edward Hawker), emigrated in 1839, being elected Speaker of the House of Assembly, South Australia in 1860. The Hawker family had a military tradition, with army commissions being held in each generation since the time of Elizabeth I. A first cousin was Arthur Bagot, a naval officer in the First World War and Albert Medal recipient.

Lanoe was sent to Stubbington House School and at the age of 11 to the Royal Navy College in Dartmouth, but although highly intelligent and an enthusiastic sportsman, he suffered from a weak constitution, which led to jaundice. With the strenuous nature of a naval career unsuitable, he entered the Royal Military Academy, Woolwich before joining the Royal Engineers as an officer cadet. A clever inventor, Hawker developed a keen interest in all mechanical and engineering developments. During the summer of 1910 he saw a film featuring the Wright Flyer and after attending an aircraft flying display at Bournemouth, he quickly found an interest in aviation, learning to fly at his own expense at Hendon. On 4 March 1913, Hawker was awarded Aviator's Certificate No. 435 by the Royal Aero Club.

Promoted to 1st Lieutenant in October 1913 he was posted to Cork Harbour with the 33rd Fortress Company. His request for attachment to the Royal Flying Corps was granted and he reported to the Central Flying School at Upavon on 1 August 1914, three days before Britain entered the First World War.

== With the Royal Flying Corps ==
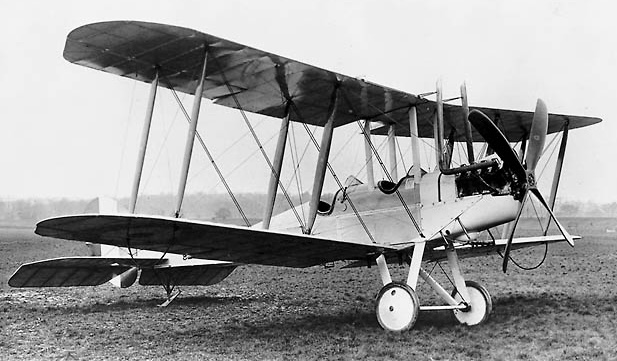
A B.E.2c

Hawker was posted to France in October 1914, as a captain with No. 6 Squadron, Royal Flying Corps, flying Henri Farmans. The squadron converted to the B.E.2c and he undertook numerous reconnaissance missions into 1915, being wounded once by ground fire. On 22 April he was awarded the Distinguished Service Order for attacking a German zeppelin shed at Gontrode by dropping hand grenades at low level (below 200 ft) from his B.E.2c. He used a tethered German balloon to help shield him from enemy ground fire as he made successive attacks. During the Second Battle of Ypres, Hawker was wounded in the foot by ground fire. For the remainder of the battle he had to be carried to and from his aircraft, but refused to be grounded until the fight was over.

He returned to 6 Squadron after hospitalisation. The squadron received several single-seat scouts, and some early F.E.2 'pushers'. One aircraft received was a Bristol Scout C, with RFC s/n 1609 that Hawker, with assistance from Air Mechanic Ernest Elton (who later became an ace himself), equipped with their design of Lewis gun mount, enabling the machine gun to fire forward obliquely at an acute horizontal angle to the axis of flight, missing the propeller arc.

While with No 6 squadron in 1915, Captain Hawker was a comrade of Captain Louis Strange. The Squadron became pioneers of many aspects in military aviation at the time, driven largely by the imagination of Strange and the engineering talents of Hawker. Their talents led to various mountings for Lewis machine guns, one of which won Hawker the Victoria Cross, and one that nearly cost Strange his life.

Hawker's innovative ideas at this time greatly benefited the fledgling RFC. He helped to invent the Prideaux disintegrating link machine-gun belt feed, and initiated the practice of putting fabric protective coverings on the tips of wooden propellers, the use of fur-lined thigh boots, and devising a primitive 'rocking fuselage' for target practice on the ground. In 1916 he also developed (with W.L. French) the increased capacity 97-round 'double drum' for the Lewis machine gun. It was issued for trials in July and after modifications was issued generally to the RFC and RNAS.

== Victoria Cross ==
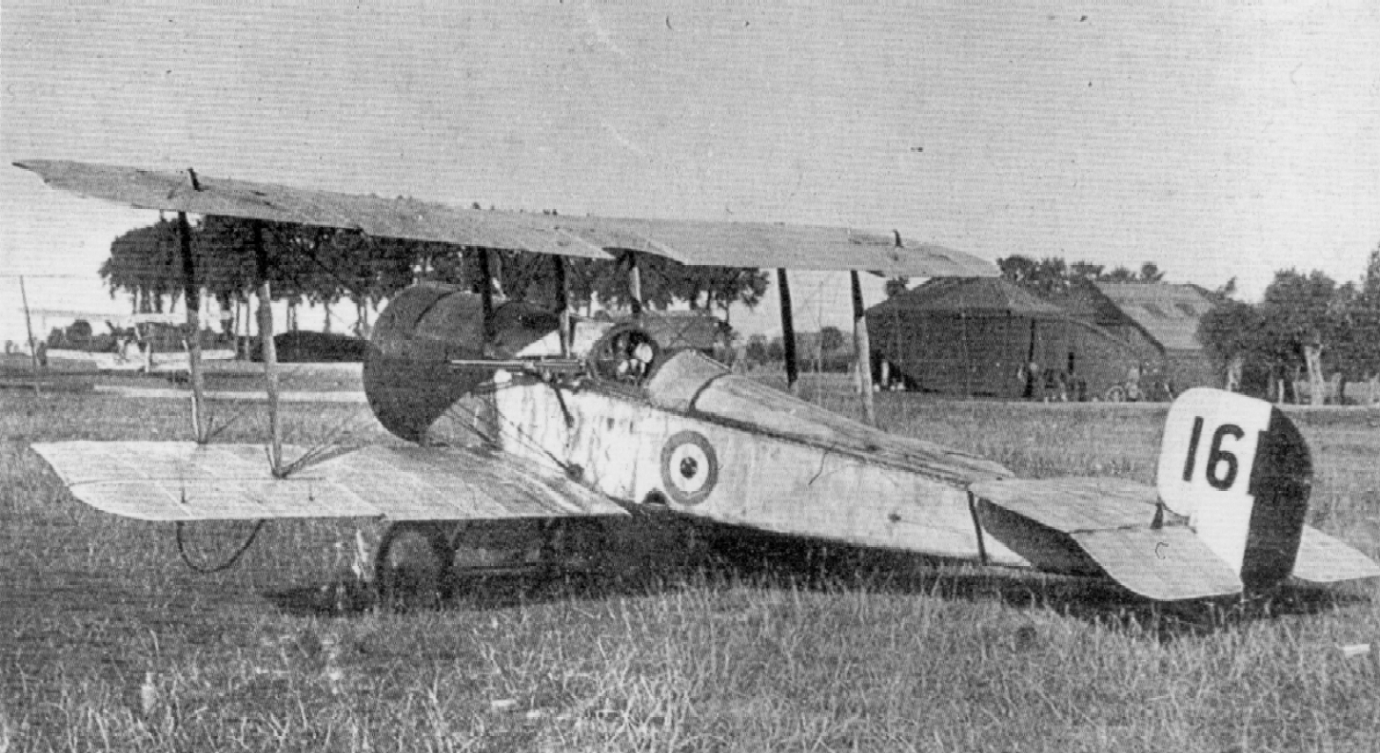
The Bristol Scout C, RFC serial no. 1611, flown by Hawker on 25 July 1915 in his Victoria Cross-earning engagement

Following an initial air victory in June, on 25 July 1915 when on patrol over Passchendaele, 24 year old Captain Hawker attacked three German aircraft in succession, flying a different Bristol Scout C, serial No. 1611, after his earlier No. 1609 had been written off, transplanting the custom Lewis gun mount onto No. 1611. The first aerial victory for Hawker that day occurred after he had emptied a complete drum of bullets from his aircraft's single Lewis machine gun into it, sending it spinning down. The second was driven to the ground damaged, and the third – an Albatros C.I of FFA 3 – which he attacked at a height of about 10,000 feet, burst into flames and crashed. (Pilot Oberleutnant Uebelacker and observer Hauptmann Roser were both killed.) For this feat he was awarded the Victoria Cross, as the third military pilot (and the first fighter pilot) to receive the Victoria Cross (VC), following William Barnard Rhodes-Moorhouse's pioneering award for bravery during a bombing raid, and Reginald Warneford's award for an anti-Zeppelin attack on an airborne Deutsches Heer airship, using aerial bombing to bring it down.

This particular sortie was just one of the many which Captain Hawker undertook during almost a year of constant operational flying and fighting. He claimed at least three more victories in August 1915, either in the Scout or an F.E.2.

Hawker was posted back to England in late 1915, with some seven victory claims (including one captured, three destroyed, one 'out of control' and one 'forced to land'), making him the first British flying ace, and a figure of considerable fame within the ranks of the RFC.

It has since been argued that shooting down three aircraft in one mission was a feat repeated several times by later pilots, and whether Hawker deserved his Victoria Cross has been questioned. However, in the context of the air war of mid-1915 it was unusual to shoot down even one aircraft, and the VC was awarded on the basis that all the enemy planes were armed with machine guns. More significantly, by the early summer of 1915, the German Feldflieger Abteilung two-seater observation units of the future Luftstreitkräfte, had by this time, received examples of the Fokker Eindecker monoplane, with one Eindecker going to each unit, with a fixed, forward-firing machine gun fitted with a "synchronization gear" that prevented the bullets from striking the propeller. The first claim using this arrangement, though unconfirmed by the German Army, was by Leutnant Kurt Wintgens on 1 July 1915, some 225 miles (362 km) over Lunéville distant from where Hawker had his three-victory success nearly a month later. Therefore, the German pilots like Wintgens and Leutnant Otto Parschau, another pioneering Eindecker pilot, could employ the simple combat tactic of aiming the whole aircraft, and presenting a small target to the enemy while approaching from any angle, preferably from a blind spot where the enemy observer could not return fire.

Hawker flew before Britain had any workable synchroniser gear, so his Bristol Scout had its machine gun mounted on the left side of the cockpit, firing forwards and sideways at a 45 degree angle to avoid the propeller. The only direction from which he could attack an enemy was from its right rear quarter – precisely in a direction from which it was easy for the observer to fire at him. Thus, in each of the three attacks, Hawker was directly exposed to the fire of an enemy machine gun.

== First Fighter Squadron ==
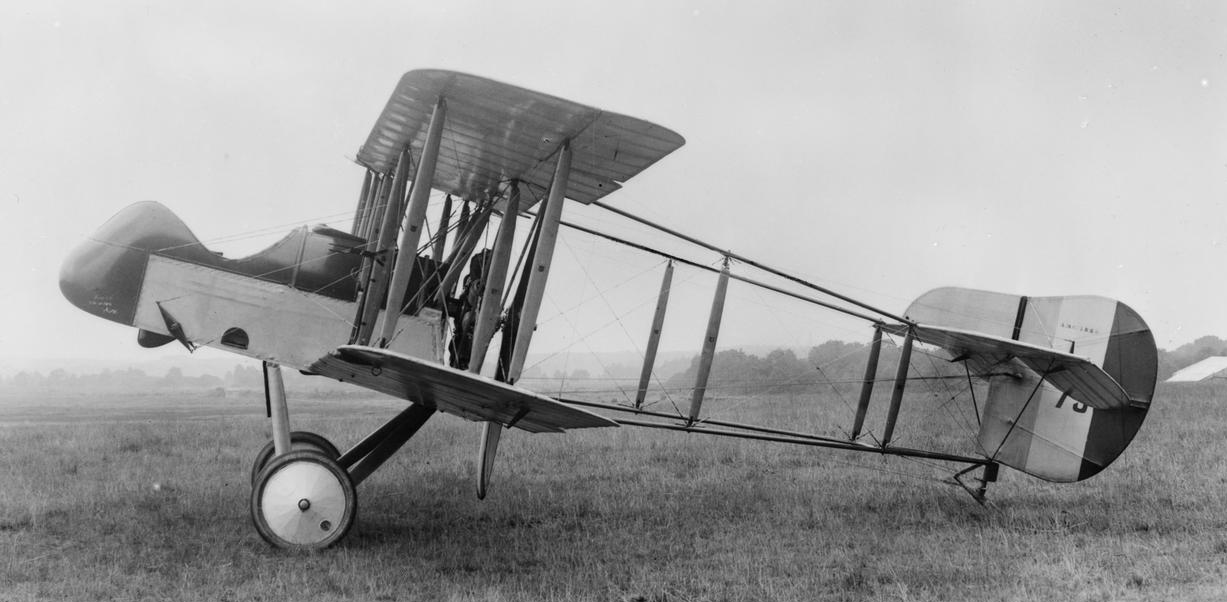
Airco DH.2

Promoted to major early in 1916. Hawker was placed in command of the RFC's first (single seater) fighter squadron, Number 24 based at Hounslow Heath Aerodrome and flying the Airco DH.2 pusher. After two fatalities in recent flying accidents, the new fighter, which featured a forward-mounted Lewis machine gun, soon earned a reputation for spinning; its rear mounted rotary engine and sensitive controls made it very responsive. Hawker countered this worry by taking a DH.2 up over the squadron base and, in front of the squadron pilots, put the aircraft through a series of spins, each time recovering safely. After landing, he carefully described to all pilots the correct procedures to recover from a spin. Once the pilots became used to the DH.2's characteristics, confidence in the aircraft rose quickly, as they came to appreciate its manoeuvrability.

He then led the squadron back to Bertangles, north of the Somme in February 1916, where the squadron quickly helped counter the Fokker Eindecker monoplanes of the Imperial German Army's Fliegertruppe which were dominant over the Western Front in the run up to the Somme offensive in July 1916. Hawker's aggressive personal philosophy of "Attack Everything", was the entire text of his tactical order of 30 June 1916. Spurred by his aggressiveness, 24 Squadron claimed some 70 victories by November at the cost of 12 of its own planes and 21 pilots killed, wounded or missing. Around this time, Hawker developed a ring gunsight and created a clamp and spring-clip device to hold the Lewis in place on the DH.2. He also designed sheepskin boots that reached to the upper thigh, known as "fug-boots," which became standard issue to combat the risk of frostbite at high altitude.

By mid 1916, RFC policy was to ban squadron commanders from operational flying, Hawker included. However, he continued to make frequent offensive patrols and reconnaissance flights, particularly over the Somme battlefields.

As the year wore on, the Germans introduced far more potent fighters to the front, starting with the Luftstreitkräfte's first biplane fighter, the single-gun armed Halberstadt D.II, and shortly thereafter the even more advanced, twin-gunned Albatros D.I, rapidly making the DH.2 obsolete.

== Death ==
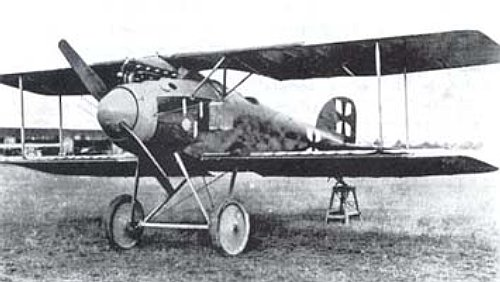
Albatros D.II

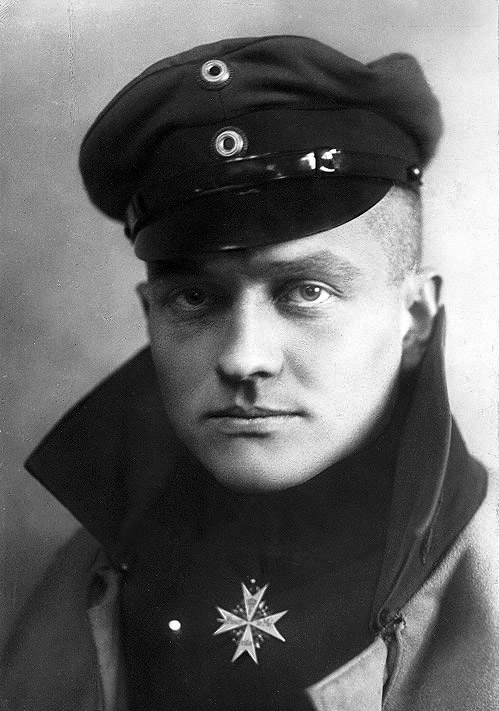
Manfred von Richthofen

On 23 November 1916, Hawker left Bertangles Aerodrome at 1300 hours, flying an Airco DH.2 (Serial No. 5964), as part of 'A' Flight, led by Captain (later Air Vice Marshal) J. O. Andrews and including Lieutenant (later Air Marshal) R.H.M.S Saundby. Andrews led the flight in an attack on two German aircraft over Achiet. Spotting a larger flight of German aircraft above, Andrews was about to break off the attack, but spotted Hawker diving to attack. Andrews and Saundby followed him to back him up in his fight; Andrews drove off one of the Germans attacking Hawker, then took bullets in his engine and glided out of the fight under Saundby's covering fire.

Losing contact with the other DH.2s, Hawker began a lengthy dogfight with an Albatros D.II flown by Leutnant Manfred von Richthofen of Jasta 2; both pilots fought a wild turning melee. The Albatros was faster than the DH.2, more powerful and, with a pair of lMG 08 machine guns, more heavily armed. Richthofen fired 900 rounds during the running battle. Running low on fuel, Hawker eventually broke away from the combat and attempted to return to Allied lines. Richthofen's guns jammed 50 yards from the lines, but he cleared one of the guns and he was able to fire a burst; one of the bullets struck Hawker in the back of the head, killing him instantly. His plane spun from 1,000 ft (300 m) and crashed 200 yards (180 metres) east of Luisenhof Farm, just south of Bapaume on the Flers Road. Hawker was the German ace's 11th victim.

Richthofen later described the dogfight:

I WAS extremely proud when, one fine day, I was informed that the airman whom I had brought down on the twenty- third of November, 1916, was the English [equivalent of] Immelmann....

First we circled twenty times to the left, and then thirty times to the right. Each tried to get behind and above the other. Soon I discovered that I was not meeting a beginner. He had not the slightest intention of breaking off the fight. He was travelling in a machine which turned beautifully. However, my own was better at rising than his, and I succeeded at last in getting above and beyond my English waltzing partner.

... The impertinent fellow was full of cheek and when we had got down to about 3,000 feet he merrily waved to me as if he would say, "Well, how do you do?"

The circles which we made around one another were so narrow that their diameter was probably no more than 250 or 300 feet. I had time to take a good look at my opponent....

When he had come down to about three hundred feet he tried to escape by flying in a zig-zag course during which, as is well known, it is difficult for an observer to shoot. That was my most favorable moment. I followed him at an altitude of from two hundred and fifty feet to one hundred and fifty feet, firing all the time. The Englishman could not help falling. But the jamming of my gun nearly robbed me of my success.

My opponent fell, shot through the head, one hundred and fifty feet behind our line.

German Grenadiers reported burying Hawker 250 yards (230 metres) east of Luisenhof Farm along the roadside. Richthofen claimed Hawker's Lewis gun from the wreck as a trophy and hung it above the door of his quarters. Similar to Georges Guynemer's and Werner Voss' gravesites Hawker's battlefield gravesite was lost; Major Lanoe George Hawker is listed on the Arras Flying Services Memorial for airmen lost with no known grave. Richthofen described Hawker as "the British Boelcke". Andrews described Hawker's death as "a great blow as everyone liked him, and had absolute confidence in him as a commanding officer". Saundby quoted Shakespeare as a eulogy to Hawker.

== Legacy ==
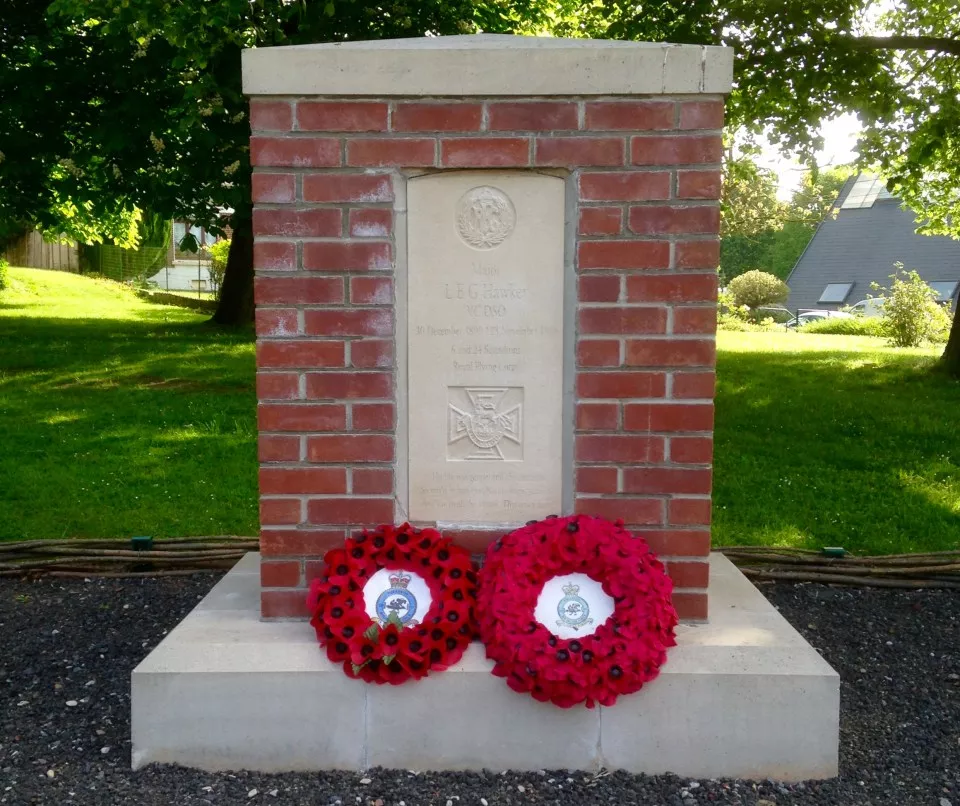
Monument for Hawker

Hawker's original Victoria Cross was lost when the Hawker family belongings were left behind after the fall of France in 1940. On their return after the Second World War, they found that their possessions, including the VC, had been stolen. A replacement was issued to Hawker's brother on 3 February 1960, and is now held by the Royal Air Force Museum, Hendon.

A window (designed by Francis Skeat) commemorating Hawker was installed in St Nicholas church, Longparish in 1967. The design features St Michael above an airfield with two pilots in the foreground. A copy of the window is in the Army Flying Museum at Middle Wallop.

A memorial to Hawker was unveiled in the village of Ligny Thilloy, one km from where he crashed and was buried, on 11 November 2011. It was erected by XXIV Squadron, Royal Air Force, beside the village war memorial.

== In popular culture ==
- Hawker is featured in the popular PC game Red Baron.
- Fictional versions of Hawker were portrayed by Corin Redgrave in the 1971 film Von Richthofen and Brown, and Richard Krajčo in the 2008 film The Red Baron. A more historically accurate version of Hawker was played by Tom Lewin in the 2023 short film Hawker.

== Bibliography ==
- Guttman, Jon (2009). Pusher Aces of World War I. Osprey Pub Co. ISBN 978-1-84603-417-6.
- Hawker, Tyrrel (2013). Hawker VC RFC Ace: The life of Major Lanoe Hawker VC DSO, 1890–1916. Pen and Sword. ISBN 978-1781593455.
- Kilduff, Peter (1994). The Red Baron: Beyond the Legend. London: Cassell. ISBN 0-304-35207-1.
- Staunton, Anthony (2005). Victoria Cross: Australia's Finest and the Battles they Fought. Prahran, Victoria, Australia: Hardie Grant Books. ISBN 1-74066-288-1.
