= Harry Wood (aviator) =

Harry Alison Wood
- Born: 16 March 1894; Toronto, Canada
- Died: 28 August 1959 (aged 65)
- Military career
- Allegiance: Canada; United Kingdom
- Branch: Royal Flying Corps
- Rank: Major
- Units: No. 34 Squadron RFC, No. 40 Squadron RFC, No. 24 Squadron RFC
- Commands: No. 62 TDS RAF
- Awards: Military Cross

Major Harry Alison Wood MC was a Canadian World War I flying ace credited with six aerial victories.

== Biography ==
Before the war, Wood studied civil engineering at Toronto University. After joining the Corps of Guides as a lieutenant, he transferred to the Royal Flying Corps. He trained in the United Kingdom, and joined No. 34 Squadron at Netheravon. He transferred to No. 34 Squadron, then to No. 24 Squadron in early summer of 1916. On 18 June 1916, on his first combat sortie, he attacked four encroaching Germans and broke up their reconnaissance patrol. He went on to down six Germans, and be shot down twice by ground fire. He became a Flight Commander before March 1917, when he was assigned back in England on Home Establishment. He was awarded the Military Cross on 4 June 1917, and promoted to major in March 1918.

After the war ended, he never again set foot in an airplane. He went on to work for the Canadian National Railway, ending up as Chief of Development. He retired from that post in March 1959. Shortly after joining another firm in Montreal, he died of a heart attack.
