= Operational history of the Dornier Do 17 =

Do 17
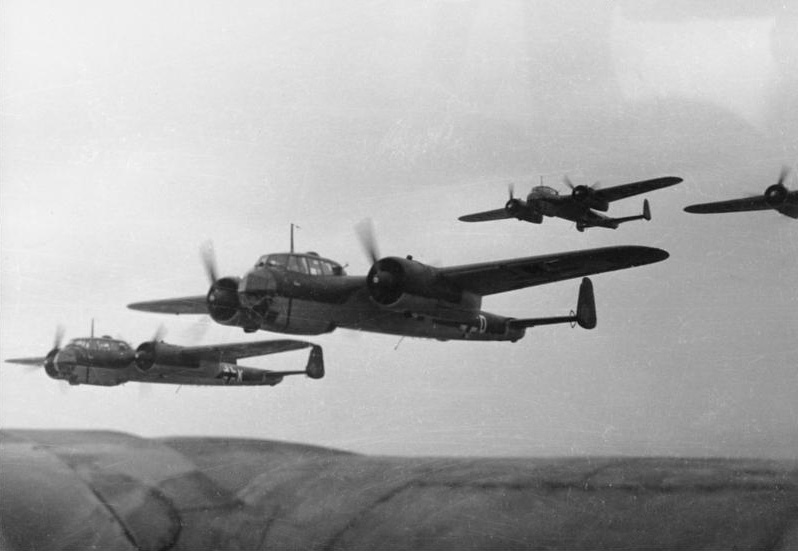
- A formation of Dornier Do 17Zs, circa 1940

General information
- Type: Reconnaissance-bomber
- National origin: Nazi Germany

History
- First flight: Autumn 1934
- Variant: Dornier 215

== Luftwaffe service ==
=== The first Dornier Kampfgeschwader ===
In late 1936, the Do 17 E-1 began to be mass-produced. The first Luftwaffe units to receive the bomber were Kampfgeschwader 153 (KG 153), and KG 155. Aufklärungsgruppe (F)/122, a reconnaissance unit, began converting to the Do 17 F-1. In early 1937, KG 255 was formed, also to be equipped with the Do 17 E-1. According to the Generalquartiermeister der Luftwaffe, 479 Do 17s were on strength. Some 100 more had been lost in crashes or sent to Spain. On 12 March 1938, Do 17Es of KG 155 dropped pro-Nazi leaflets on Vienna, as a prelude to the city's occupation during the German Anschluss operation. KG 153 received its first Do 17 E-1s on 20 September 1938 as part of a mass re-equipment program (note the significance of the date). The unit was redesignated KG 3 on 1 May 1939. KG 155 converted on to the type in early 1938. KG 252 was also equipped with the Do 17M, at this time to meet the threat of the Sudeten Crisis. By December 1938, it had 26 Do 17s and 17 crews. On 1 May 1939, the Kampfgeschwader was redesignated Kampfgeschwader 2.

=== Spanish Civil War ===
The Do 17's baptism of fire came during the Spanish Civil War (1936–39), where it outpaced most enemy fighters and performed well. The Spanish nicknamed the Dornier the Bacalao ("Codfish"). In early 1937, mass production began on the Do 17E and Do 17F series. The Do 17 F-1 was to replace the Heinkel He 70 as a high-flying fast reconnaissance aircraft, while the Do 17 E-1 was to supplant the Legion Condor's aging Heinkel He 111B bomber. However, more modern Soviet-supplied Republican aircraft were capable of intercepting the E and F variants, which prompted an upgrade of the Dornier's defensive armament.

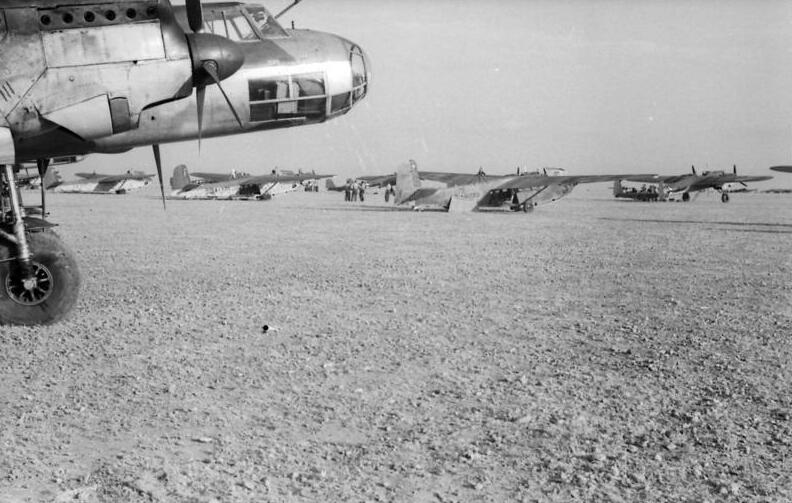
Do 17E variant. A fleet of DFS 230 gliders can be seen in the background

Among the units committed to Franco's cause was Hauptmann Rudolf Freiherr Von Moreau's 4.K/88. On 6 January 1937, it was decided by Erhard Milch, Albert Kesselring and Ernst Udet that the Legion should have more modern aircraft. Soon 12 Do 17 E-1s, as well as He 111B-1s and Ju 86D-1s were dispatched to serve in Spain. The unit was named VB/88 (Versuchsbomben Staffel, meaning Experimental Bomber Squadron). VB/88s Dorniers were involved in a strike around Guernica, but that particular unit's objective was a bridge, rather than civilian areas. VB/88 dropped 8 tonnes (9 tons) of bombs, while K/88 added 37 tonnes (41 tons) over the city itself causing the deaths of about 1,500 people. The bombing of VB/88 straddled the bridge. The only other target hit by the German bombers that day was the rail station. On 8 July 1937, the Dorniers flew multiple sorties to protect Nationalist forces now threatening the capital, Madrid. At this point, the Junkers Ju 86s had been withdrawn and replaced by the Do 17Fs. In the spring of 1938, another unit, 1.A/88, equipped with Do 17s, also arrived in Spain. A total of 27 Do 17E, F and P variants were part of the Condor Legion.

=== Polish Campaign ===
A series of new models introduced the new enlarged nose, greatly increasing defensive firepower, finally settling on the Z models, which were widely available by 1939. During the first phase of World War II, the Do 17, along with the He 111, formed the backbone of the Luftwaffe's Kampfgruppen. From 1939 to 1940, four of the Luftwaffe's bomber groups, KG 2, KG 3, KG 76 and KG 77 operated the Dornier. KG 76 and KG 77 operated the first generation Do 17E, with the other two Kampfgeschwader operating only the Do 17Z on the outbreak of war. On 1 September 1939, 533 Dorniers and 705 Heinkels were combat-ready. The total strength of the Dornier force was approximately 100 Do 17 E-1s, 32 M-1s, 188 Z-1 and Z-2s as well as 213 P-1s. Its reliability and robustness made it highly popular in the Luftwaffe.

During the campaign, Do 17s of I./KG 2 took part in the Battle of Bzura, in which they used incendiary bombs against Polish forces consisting of Army Poznań and Army Pomorze. These raids caused a huge number of Polish casualties, who by now had retreated to dense wooded areas, contributing to their vulnerability. The Do 17 had performed well and could use its speed to outrun Polish fighter aircraft under some circumstances.

=== Norwegian Campaign ===
The only Do 17 unit known to have taken part in the Norwegian Campaign was the 1.(F)/120 (Aufklärungsgruppe) long-range reconnaissance unit. It operated from Lübeck Blankensee, in northern Germany until the occupation of Denmark, and was then based at Stavanger on 10 April 1940, after the Wehrmacht had secured southern Norway. Equipped with the Do 17 P-1, it provided reconnaissance intelligence over the Norwegian coast and the North Sea.

=== Western Europe ===
The first German aircraft shot down over France during the war was a Dornier Do 17P of 2(F)123, brought down by Pilot Officer Mould's Hawker Hurricane of No. 1 Squadron RAF on 30 October 1939. The Dornier, Wrk Nr. 4414, constructed at Blohm & Voss, crashed near Vassincourt, killing all three of its crew, Hauptmann Balduin von Norman, Oberleutnant Hermann Heisterberg and Feldwebel Friedrich Pfeuffer. (Note: The unit in question was 2nd Squadron of the 123rd Long Range Reconnaissance Group, or 2./(Fernaufklärungsgruppe) 123.)

On 10 May the Dornier units, Kampfgeschwader 2, KG 3 and KG 4, were under the command of Fliegerkorps. II. Kampfgeschwader 76 and 77 also operated the Do 17 under Fliegerkorps I and Fliegerkorps VIII. The Do 17 saw its usefulness diminish during the French campaign owing to its limited bomb load and range. The design continued to be favoured by the Luftwaffe aircrews, as it was more maneuverable than the He 111 or Ju 88, and because of its ability to perform low-level strikes well. An example of this was a raid carried out by KG 2 against the RAF-controlled airfield at Vraux on 10 May. Six Bristol Blenheims and two Fairey Battles of No. 114 Squadron RAF were destroyed, with many more damaged. However, Allied fighter resistance on the first day was severe, and KG 2 and KG 3 of Fliegerkorps II lost a total of nineteen Do 17s between them on 10 May. Only two weeks into the campaign, KG 2 and 3 suffered fuel shortages, keeping the Dorniers grounded and forcing some attacks to be aborted. By the beginning of June, the Dornier Geschwader were encountering less opposition and losses declined sharply, as the Armée de l'Air was no longer a sufficient threat. However, over Dunkirk, the RAF fighters inflicted a high loss rate. On 2 June, thirty German aircraft were destroyed, including sixteen Do 17s (four from KG 2 and twelve from KG 3). The Dornier units dropped some 320 tonnes (350 tons) of bombs.

=== Battle of Britain ===
During the Polish campaign, the Do 17Z could use its 427 km/h (265 mph) maximum speed to stay away from most enemy fighters, and its light armament was effective. It also fought with success during the Battle of France and losses were relatively light, although when facing modern fighters like the Hawker Hurricane, the bomber proved slow in comparison and more vulnerable. When it faced British fighters during the Battle of Britain, it was shown that fast, well-armed monoplane fighters had changed the balance between bomber and fighter decidedly in favour of the latter. The Do 17 suffered in early raids.

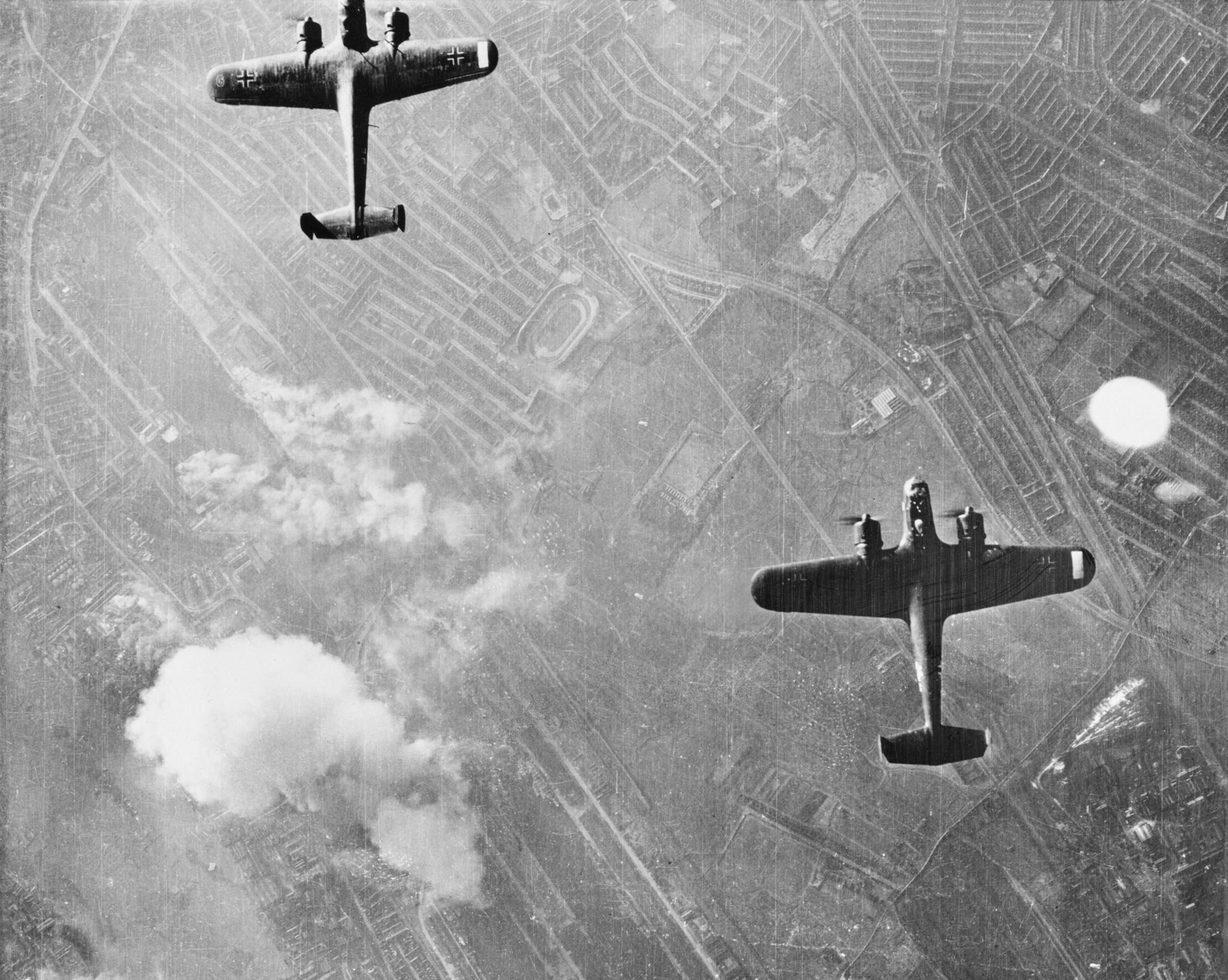
Do 17s over London, 7 September 1940

Since the Fafnir was a low-altitude engine, the Luftwaffe responded by employing the Do 17 units in a number of terrain-following mass raids in an attempt to evade fighter opposition. The Dornier was manoeuvrable in comparison to the Heinkel and the more robust nature of radial engines made it ideal for low-level attacks, with a number of units being fitted with 20 mm cannon. An example of one of these raids was the attack on RAF Kenley on 18 August, 1940, when nine aircraft from 9th Staffel of KG 76 led by Haupt. Joachim Roth, flew at very low altitude to avoid being detected by British radar and followed part of the London to Brighton railway to find their target. Four aircraft were destroyed in the attack and the remaining five were all damaged. At least one aircraft was lost to rocket propelled parachute and cable devices. Another was damaged by exploding bombs, due to the low altitude at which it was flying. The Junkers Ju 88 was now entering service in larger numbers, replacing the Do 17 at higher altitudes. The Dornier excelled at low-level attacks. However, this was becoming more and more dangerous. The British were now firing rocket-powered parachutes into the path of low-flying aircraft and dragging them from the skies. Losses were considerable.

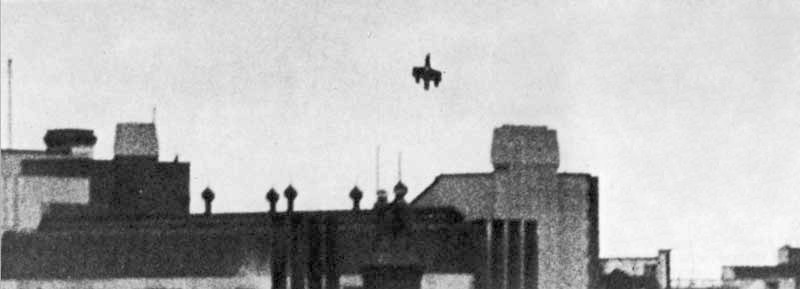
Zehbe's Dornier Do 17 falling on Victoria Station after being rammed by Ray Holmes's Hawker Hurricane, 15 September 1940

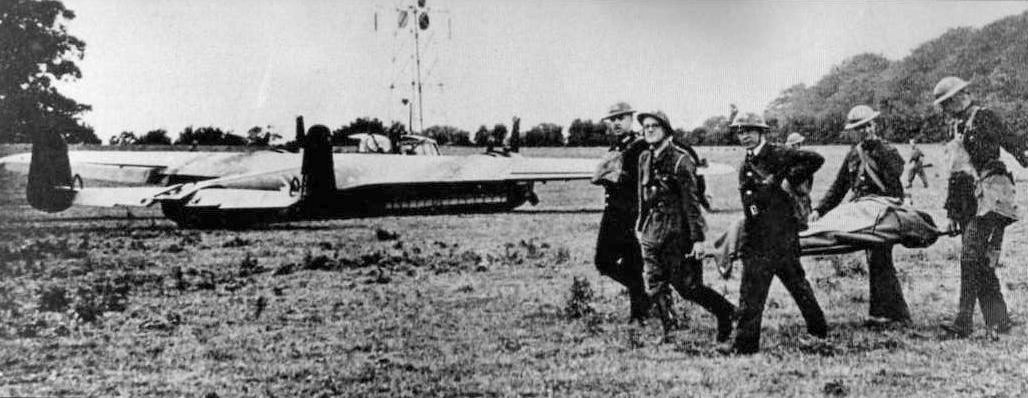
Rudolf Heitsch's Dornier in Castle Farm Shoreham. The flame throwing device is just visible on the aft fuselage. The Do 17 was shot down by John Dundas and his wingman.

The Dornier's performance advantage at low altitude became moot on 7 September 1940, when the Luftwaffe switched to the bombing of London (known as the Blitz), requiring all-out attacks at medium altitude. Losses mounted and on 15 September 1940, the three Dornier-equipped Kampfgruppen suffered heavily, losing 20 shot down and 13 damaged.

A significant event took place on 15 September 1940, now known as "Battle of Britain Day". Among these was the famous casualty of Dornier Do 17 Z-2 Wk Nr.2361, bearing the Geschwaderkennung code of F1+FH, 1.Staffel/KG 76 flown by Robert Zehbe. Zehbe developed engine trouble and lagged half a mile behind the main bomber stream. His Dornier attracted a swarm of fighters. Eventually Ray Holmes of 504 Squadron, out of bullets, rammed the bomber. The tail came off and air pressure snapped off the outer wings short of the engines. The bomber crashed onto the forecourt of London Victoria station. Zehbe bailed out, only to die later of wounds suffered during the attack, while the injured Holmes bailed out of his plane and survived. This event became one of the defining moments of the Battle of Britain and elicited a congratulatory note to the RAF from Queen Wilhelmina of the Netherlands who had witnessed the event. In the same action Dornier Do 17 F1+FS of 8.Staffel/KG 76, flown by Rudolf Heitsch, was found in a field near Shoreham. The Dornier was found to be fitted with a flamethrower, installed in the tail. Oil, nitrogen, and hydrogen cylinders were found in the fuselage, while the external pipe was fitted with a jet. Initially, it was concluded that it was a smoke producing device to feign damage. But it was discovered that it was a device that was triggered by one of the rear gunners to destroy a fighter pursuing the bomber from line astern. However, the lack of oxygen meant that the device failed to function, and only a continual spray of oil was emitted.

The losses for the Do 17 in August and September were considerable. In August 1940, 54 Dorniers were lost and another 20 written off due to technical problems and accidents. In September 50 more were lost, with 31 Do 17s and crews missing in action. In October another 36 Dorniers were lost. Dorniers had improvised armament of eight machine guns installed to increase defensive firepower, but still were unable to counter fighter attacks.

The battle continued into October as the Luftwaffe concentrated on night attacks which were carried out by units mainly equipped with the Heinkel He 111 and Junkers Ju 88, as they had bigger bomb loads, and the Ju 88 had a greater speed.

The Dornier Do 17's losses in the Battle of Britain are given as between 132 and 171, the lowest losses as a ratio of the three German bomber types.

With the introduction of the Junkers Ju 88 and the new Dornier Do 217 entering production, the Do 17's days were numbered, and production ceased in mid-1940. Even with the end of production, the Dornier saw action in notable numbers after the Battle of Britain, in the Balkan Campaign, Operation Barbarossa (the invasion of the Soviet Union), and with the other Axis air forces.

=== Balkans Campaign ===
Initially, Yugoslavia had been pro-German, and looked set to join the Axis powers, but a military coup toppled the government and declared itself neutral. Infuriated, Adolf Hitler ordered the conquest of Yugoslavia. The Yugoslavs had ordered twenty Do 17 Ka-2s at the end of 1940. These machines differed from the German Dorniers in that they were powered by French Gnome-Rhône Mistral Major engines, and had non-German weapons and instruments. In 1940, the Yugoslavs license-built fifty of these variants, but most were destroyed in the campaign.

The Luftwaffe committed Luftflotte 4 to the invasion. Included in its strength were KG 2 and KG 3, the only Kampfgruppe in a force of seven equipped with the Do 17. Among the German Kampfgruppen, some 110 Do 17s were committed. The first attacks on Belgrade were undertaken at 0651 in the morning of the 6 April. Among the German bombers were 102 Do 17s, carrying 18 SC 50 kg (110 lb) fragmentation bombs, and 2 AB 36 cluster bombs. Some 82 Do 17s remained operational after the first day, with only one reported loss, a KG 3 machine, WNr 2563 5K+DS. The Luftwaffe and its Dorniers would find the situation similar over Greece, with little aerial opposition. KG 2 took part in the Battle of Crete. I./KG 2 lost six Do 17s and seven damaged between 6 April and 31 May. III./KG 2 reported six losses and five damaged in the same period. III./KG 3 also participated in the assaults on Greece and Crete.

=== Eastern Front ===
After the successful conclusion of the Balkans campaign, the Luftwaffe prepared for Operation Barbarossa, the invasion of the Soviet Union. By this time, the Kampfgruppen had mostly converted to the Ju 88, and the Do 17 played a minimal part. Only two reconnaissance Staffeln, and three Kampfgruppen employed the Dornier. KG 2 was the only sole fully equipped Luftwaffe wing that operated the Dornier. The Dornier's most notable action on the Eastern front occurred on 23–24 June at Grodno. The commander of the Soviet Western Front, General Armii Dmitriy Pavlov attempted a counterattack against Hermann Hoth's Panzergruppe 3. With air superiority and no air opposition, Dornier Do 17s of III./KG 2 destroyed columns of Soviet infantry. With help from other units, the Luftwaffe claimed to have destroyed 105 Soviet tanks. The Soviet 6th and 11th Mechanised Corps and 6th Cavalry Corps were routed. For his unit's particular effectiveness, the commander of 9./KG 2, Hauptmann Walter Bradel, received the Knight's Cross of the Iron Cross.

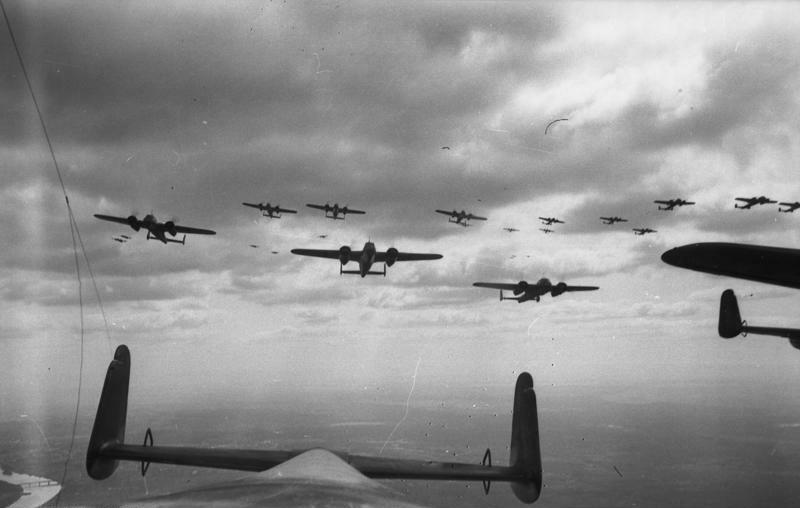
A typical Luftwaffe bomber formation; Dorniers using a "stepped up" Echelon formation.

The limitations of the Dornier reemerged on the Eastern Front, namely its limited bomb capacity and its range. The vastness of this new theatre meant its usage declined. As 1941 wore on, the Dornier was phased out of the bomber role. Surviving aircraft were used as test beds for new technologies and training schools, while many others were handed off to allied nations over the next two years.

Total losses for Kampfgeschwader 2 on the Eastern Front in 1941 indicate three Do 17s lost in June, a further nine lost in July, nine in August, a single Dornier destroyed on the ground in September, three Do 17s in October, for a total of 24 lost in aerial combat and one on the ground. The unit was withdrawn at the end of October to convert to the Junkers Ju 88.

The Do 17 continued to see action in other air forces after the mass conversion to the Ju 88 in the Luftwaffe. Of fifteen Do 17s serving with the Finnish Air Force, at least five (possibly seven) survived the end of hostilities and continued to serve until they were scrapped in 1952.

=== Night fighter ===
The Dornier Do 17 also operated as a night fighter during the Defence of the Reich campaign until 1944. At least ten 17Z's were converted; one Z-7 and nine Z-10 served for less than two years in the night fighter role, where they were used in Josef Kammhuber's defensive system, known as the Kammhuber Line. They were found by their crews to be inferior to the Junkers Ju 88C. The Do 215 was also used in this capacity. Some German night-fighter aces such as Helmut Woltersdorf flew the Do 17 and Do 215.

All surviving Z-10s were removed from front-line duty in summer 1942. They were either used as airframes to provide spare parts or transferred to night fighter schools.

=== Glider tug ===
After being withdrawn from combat duties the Do 17s were relegated for use as glider tugs beginning in 1942 where they were used to tow gliders laden with supplies. The First Group of Air Landing Wing (I./Luftlandegeschwader – LLG) 1 arrived too late to support the encircled German troops in the Stalingrad Pocket, but they did help to supply the 17th Army as it retreated into the Kuban in early 1943 with supplies delivered by DFS 230 gliders. Five Do 17s were lost during these operations between 29 January–30 March 1943. During October 1943, the Do 17s of Luftlandegeschwader 1 helped resupply, and partially evacuate the German 17th Army from the Kuban. Some Do 17s were still being used by Schleppgruppen 1 and 2 ("Glider towing unit 1 and 2") in early 1945.

On 10 July 1943, I./LLG 1 mustered 52 Do 17s and 136 DFS 230 gliders at its base in Lézignan-Corbières, France. On 10 November 1943, it had 36 Do 17s and 195 DFS 230s at its base at Strasbourg, but only 14 and 12 respectively were operational. On 21 July 1944, Do 17s towed two squadrons of I./LLG 1' to land troops on the Vercors Plateau where the French Resistance had declared the Vercors Republic. By 1 September I./LLG 1 had returned to its base at Strasbourg, but had only a strength of 20 Do 17s and was disbanded shortly afterwards.

== Other air forces ==
=== Royal Yugoslav Air Force ===
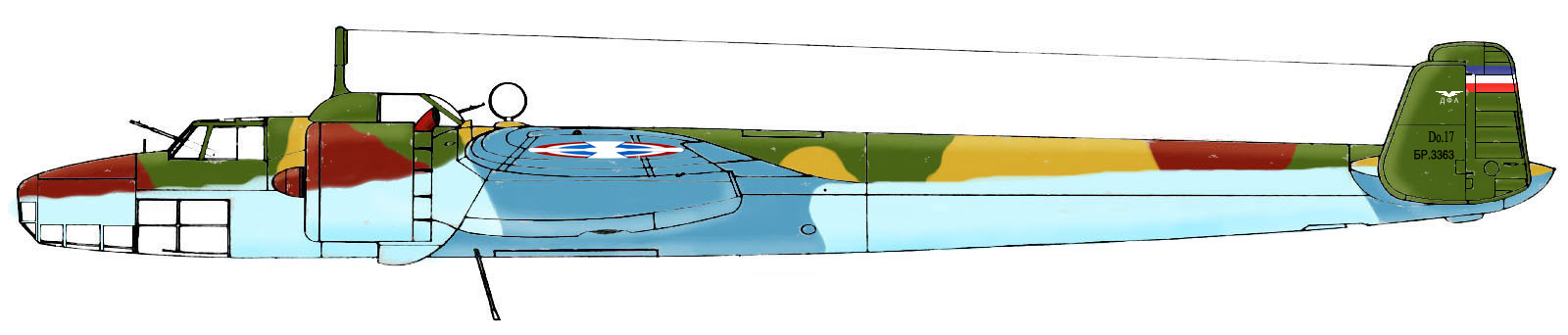
Do 17K from the 3rd Bomber Regiment of Royal Yugoslav Air Force, April 1941

At the beginning of German invasion of Yugoslavia, the Yugoslav Royal Air Force (YRAF) possessed some 60 Dornier Do 17Ks that equipped the 3 vazduhoplovni puk (3rd Bomber Regiment). It was composed of two groups: the 63rd Bomber Group stationed at Petrovec airbase near Skopje and the 64th Bomber Group stationed at Mileševo airbase near Priština. During hostilities, the aircraft factory in Kraljevo managed to produce three more aircraft. Two were delivered to the YRAF on 10 April and one on 12 April 1941. The Luftwaffe destroyed 26 of these Yugoslav Dorniers in the initial assault. Total Yugoslav losses stood at four destroyed in aerial combat and 45 destroyed on the ground. Between 14 and 15 April, seven Do 17Ks flew to Nikšić airport and took part in the evacuation of King Petar II and members of the Yugoslav government to Greece. During this operation, part of the Yugoslav gold reserves not evacuated prior to the war were also airlifted to Greece by seven Do 17s. After completing their task, five Do 17Ks were destroyed when Italian aircraft attacked Paramithia airbase in Greece. Only two Do 17Kb-1s escaped destruction and later joined the RAF in Egypt, where they were allocated the serial numbers AX707 and AX706. However, both machines were destroyed in an air attack on 27 August 1941. During this time, it is also recorded that two Dorniers escaped to the Soviet Union. According to other sources 23 Yugoslav Dorniers survived the April battles, and the RAF received a third machine.

=== Bulgarian Air Force ===
The Bulgarian Air Force received 11 Do 17 M-1s and P-1s in 1940. After their participation in the Balkans Campaign against Yugoslavia and Greece, the Bulgarians were given 15 captured Yugoslav Do 17Kb-1s. These including spare parts, engines, and landing gear. The Dorniers were assigned to the 1./5. bombardirovicen orlijak (1st Squadron of the 5th Bomber Regiment). In the Bulgarian occupation zones of Yugoslavia, the Do 17s carried out missions against Yugoslav Chetniks and partisans in 1941–1944. They also supported Croatian forces in the same role. Another six Do 17Ms were received in 1943. In September 1944, the Bulgarians switched sides and declared war on their former ally, Germany. At this time they had 20 Do 17s of all types assigned to the 1./5. Bomber Group and five Do 17 Ps assigned to 3./1. Reconnaissance Squadron and another four Do 17 Ps assigned to 73. Long-range Reconnaissance Flight. In 71 days of operations against German forces, 32 aircraft (including some Do 17s) in Bulgarian service were lost. In 362 combat sorties, the pilots claimed 173 lorries and motor vehicles, 42 railroad cars, seven armoured vehicles and 10 aircraft destroyed or damaged, but actual German losses were nowhere near this total. The Bulgarians had underestimated the damage done which was "far beyond this [these] figures". With the exception of the Do 17s of 73. Long-range Reconnaissance Flight, the Do 17s didn't fly missions against the Axis after 2 December. As part of their war reparations to Yugoslavia, four Do 17s were delivered by Bulgaria after the war. Their subsequent fate remains unknown.

=== Croatian Air Force ===
The Independent State of Croatia was formed during the German Invasion of Yugoslavia in April 1941. It formed an air unit called Hrvatska zrakoplovna legija ("Croatian Air Force Legion") on 27 June 1941 for service against the Soviets It had 160 airmen who attended German aviation schools such as Kampffliegerschule 3 on the Baltic to train on the Do 17Z. On 31 October 1941, the unit was assigned to Kampfgeschwader 3 as 10.(kroatisch)/KG 3, with 15 Do 17Zs, on the Eastern Front. The unit did not suffer its first fatalities until 1 December 1941, during the Battle of Moscow. By the time of its withdrawal to Croatia in February/March 1942, the unit was credited with 366 combat sorties, 71 low-level attacks, four villages, 173 buildings, 276 enemy vehicles destroyed and 11 enemy aircraft shot down. Another squadron was sent to the Eastern Front in July 1942, using German-owned Do 17Zs, where they were designated as 15.(kroat.)/KG 53. They were withdrawn to Croatia in November 1942.

The number of Do 17s that saw action in Croatian units is hard to determine. Croatian staffeln formed part of German Kampfgeschwader as well as their own independent units and it is uncertain how many, if any, of their aircraft they brought back upon their return to Croatia. In January 1942, 11 Do 17Kas were given to Croatia. A further six Do 17s from Luftwaffe units were promised, but they were never delivered according to one source, but another says that six Do 17Es were delivered in 1942. On 23 September 1942, or in March 1943 another 30 Do 17Es were sold to Croatia and a further 30 were promised but not delivered. In November 1943, another request was agreed for 79 Do 17Zs, but once again the aircraft were never delivered. By December 1943, the 1st and 2nd Croat Bomber Squadrons formed part of the Croatian Air Force Legion and were to expand to a full group in size in February 1944, but it is unclear if this was more than a redesignation on paper.

On 30 July 1944, a defecting Do 17Z-5, designation Z8+AH of Kroat. KGr 1, crash-landed at Cerignola, south of Foggia, Italy. Later, in 1944, a Do 17F-1 was captured by Yugoslav partisans and flown into British captivity in Bari, Italy., although this has not been substantiated by later research. One source cites a total of three Do 17s that landed in Allied-occupied Italy; one Do 17Z on 13 July 1944, the Do 17Z-5 mentioned earlier on 30 July 1944, and another Do 17Z on 10 August.

Further deliveries of new aircraft from Germany continued in the early months of 1945 to replace losses. These included the final dozen Do 17 medium bombers in January. The Dornier Do 17 medium bombers of the ZNDH were still hitting back when and where they could and on 31 December 1944, a Dornier Do 17E attacked an RAF 148 Squadron Handley Page Halifax bomber on the ground at the Partisan airfield at Grabovnica near Čazma, destroying it with bombs. On 10 February 1945, a single ZNDH Dornier Do 17Z caught 1. Zagorska Brigada (1st Zagorje Brigade) marching in the open near Daruvar. The Yugoslav Partisan unit suffered some two dozen casualties. On 15 April 1945, a force made up of a Dornier Do 17Z, escorted by two Messerschmitt Bf 109Gs destroyed two aircraft of the Yugoslav Partisans at their airfield at Sanski Most.

On the evening of 6 May 1945, with Yugoslav Partisan forces advancing upon the Croatian capital city of Zagreb, the commanding officer of the Croatian fighter group gathered together his men at Zagreb's Lucko airfield and released them from their oath of loyalty and announced that each was free to go. Some flew their aircraft and crews, including several Dornier Do 17s and a CANT Z.1007 to Italy and the Allied forces there. Some flew their aircraft over to the Partisans, including several light aircraft and some Messerschmitt Bf 109s, whilst others, also including Messerschmitt Bf 109s, as well as at least one Dornier Do 17Z, a Messerschmitt Bf 110G-2, a Bristol Blenheim I and a Yugoslav designed and built Zmaj Fizir F.P.2 sought sanctuary at Klagenfurt in Austria.

=== Finnish Air Force ===
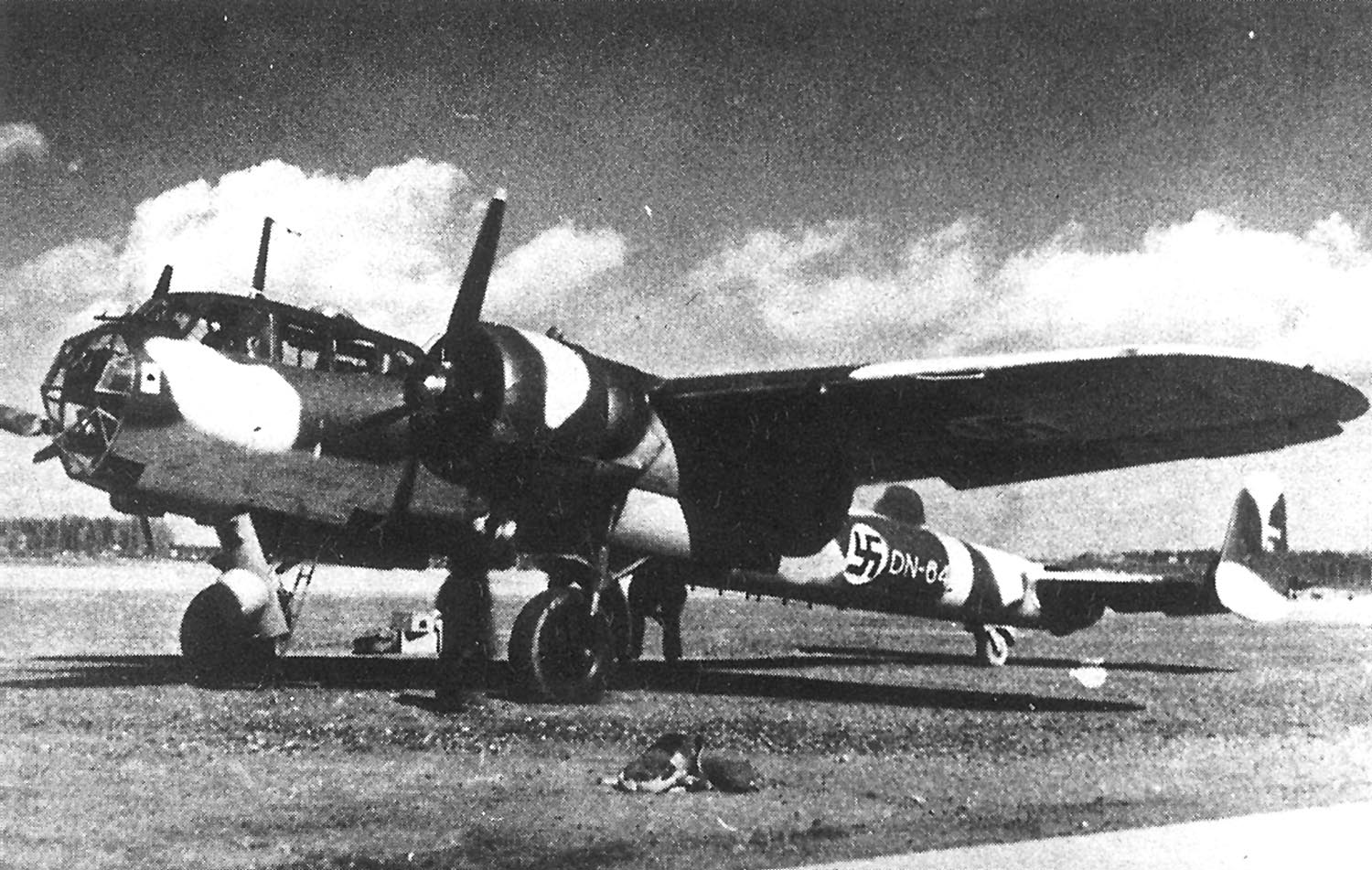
Do 17Z of the Finnish Air Force.

In November 1941, Reichsmarschall Hermann Göring decided to give 15 Dornier Do 17Z aircraft to the Finnish Air Force. No. 46 Squadron operated the Dorniers. The Finns used their Do 17 aircraft mainly for night bombing and against "soft" targets at the front, since the aircraft were considered obsolete – the speed and climbing abilities of the Do 17 were deemed inadequate by 1942 standards.

Fifteen Do 17s (three Z-1, three Z-2 and nine Z-3) saw service with the Finns. Ten were lost between January 1943 and January 1945, the remaining five were not scrapped until in 1952. (For a full list of the Dorniers used see:Finnish Air Force No. 46 Squadron). The Finnish nickname was Lentävä lyijykynä ("Flying Pencil").

=== Royal Romanian Air Force ===
Ten Do 17Ms were received in April–May 1942 and were assigned to Escadrila 2 for reconnaissance missions.
