= Johann Raithel =

- Born: 11 March 1897; Munich, German Empire
- Died: 29 January 1961 (aged 63); Hamburg, West Germany
- Military career
- Allegiance: German Empire; Weimar Republic; Nazi Germany
- Branch: Luftwaffe
- Service years: 1914–45
- Rank: Generalleutnant
- Commands: Jagdgeschwader 132; Kampfgeschwader 77
- Conflicts: World War I World War II
- Awards: Knight's Cross of the Iron Cross

Johann Raithel (11 March 1897 – 29 January 1961) was a German general of the Luftwaffe, who commanded the Kampfgeschwader 77 during World War II. He was a recipient of the Knight's Cross of the Iron Cross of Nazi Germany.

On 1 April 1936, Raithel was tasked with the creation of Jagdgeschwader 132 "Richthofen" (JG 132—132nd Fighter Wing) and appointed its first Geschwaderkommodore (wing commander). (Note: On 1 November 1938, JG 132 was renamed to Jagdgeschwader 131 which then became Jagdgeschwader 2 on 1 May 1939.)

His daughter Anneliese married Hubert Greim, son of Generalfeldmarschall Robert Ritter von Greim.

== Awards and decorations ==
- Knight's Cross of the Iron Cross on 17 October 1941 as Oberst and Geschwaderkommodore of Kampfgeschwader 77

== Notes ==
Military offices
Preceded by None	Commander of Jagdgeschwader 132; 1 April 1936 – 8 June 1936	Succeeded by Oberst Gerd von Massow
Preceded by Generalmajor Heinz-Hellmuth von Wühlisch	Commander of Kampfgeschwader 77; 1 August 1940 – 13 March 1942	Succeeded by Major Arved Crüger
