= Karl Thom =

German flying ace (1893–1945)

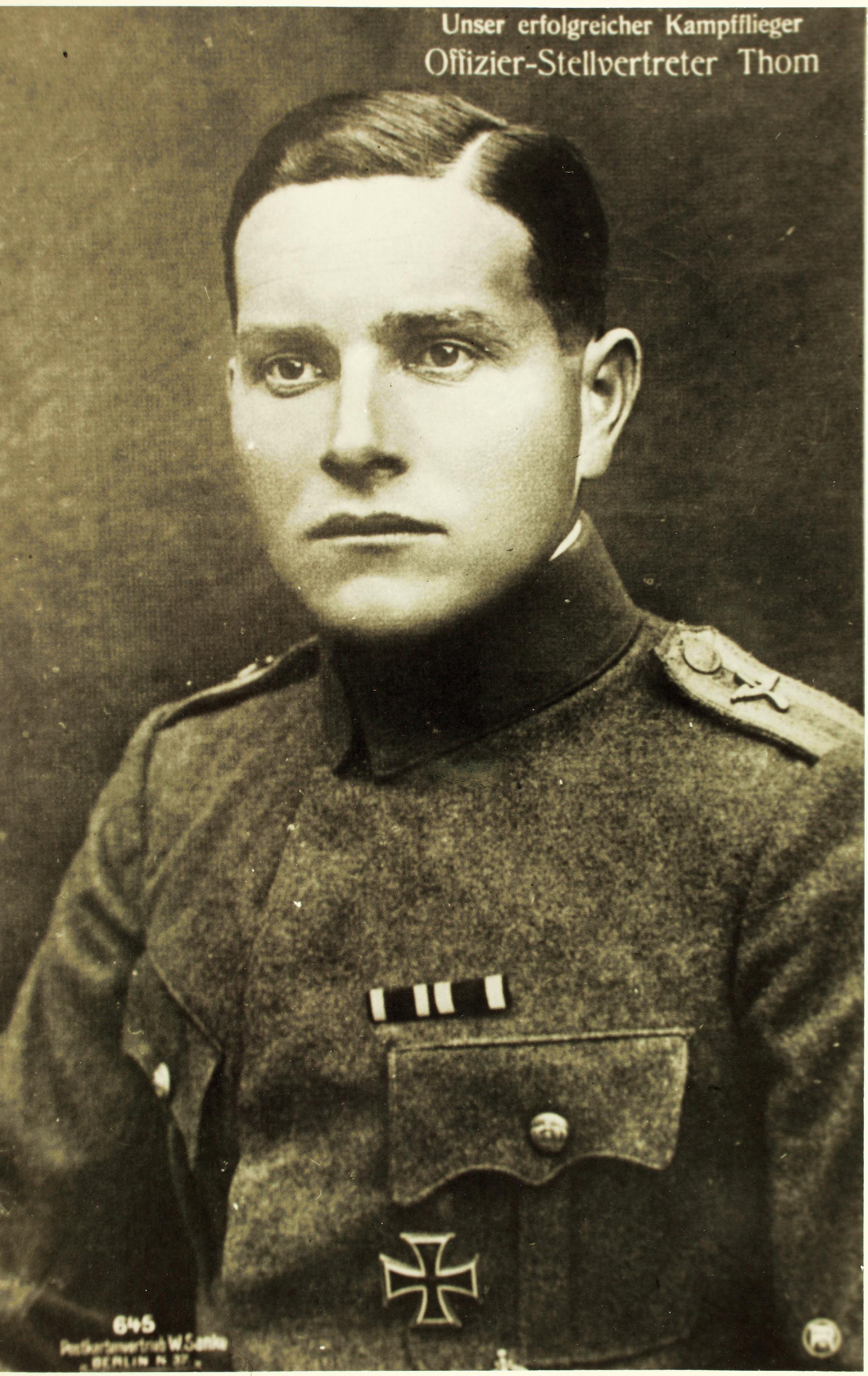
- Born: 19 May 1893; Freystadt, West Prussia, Kingdom of Prussia, German Empire
- Died: 3 March 1945 (aged 51) (disappeared); Pillau, East Prussia, Nazi Germany
- Military career
- Allegiance: German Empire, Nazi Germany
- Branch: Aerial Service, Luftwaffe
- Service years: 1911–1918; 1944–1945
- Rank: Leutnant
- Units: Flieger-Abteilung (Artillerie) 48; Flieger-Abteilung (Artillerie) 216; Flieger-Abteilung (Artillerie) 234; Jagdstaffel 21
- Awards: Pour le Mérite, Military Merit Cross, Royal House Order of Hohenzollern, Iron Cross

Leutnant Karl Thom (19 May 1893 – 3 March 1945), was a German World War I flying ace credited with 27 victories. He was decorated with both his nation's highest decorations for valor, the Military Merit Cross as an enlisted soldier, and the Pour le Mérite after he was commissioned as an officer. He was one of only four German aces of World War I to achieve this double award.

== Early life ==
Karl Thom was born the son of a field hand. He began his military service by enlisting in 1911 with Hussar Regiment Number 5. He was serving with Mounted Rifle Regiment Number 10 when World War I began. He was wounded for the first time in November 1914.

== Reconnaissance service ==
Upon his recovery, Thom transferred to the Air Service. His first assignment after training was piloting a two-seater reconnaissance plane for FFA 216. He patrolled in the vicinity of Vosges until he was injured in a crash in May 1916.

Upon recovery, he was reassigned to FFA 48. He was captured there when forced down. He was awarded the Iron Cross First Class for his subsequent escape. He returned to duty for a brief tour with FFA 234 before transferring again.

== Fighter service ==
Despite being a Prussian, he was assigned to a Saxon fighter unit, Jagdstaffel 21, in May 1917.

He joined his new squadron at approximately the same time as its new leader, Staffelführer Eduard Ritter von Schleich, who took charge on 26 May.

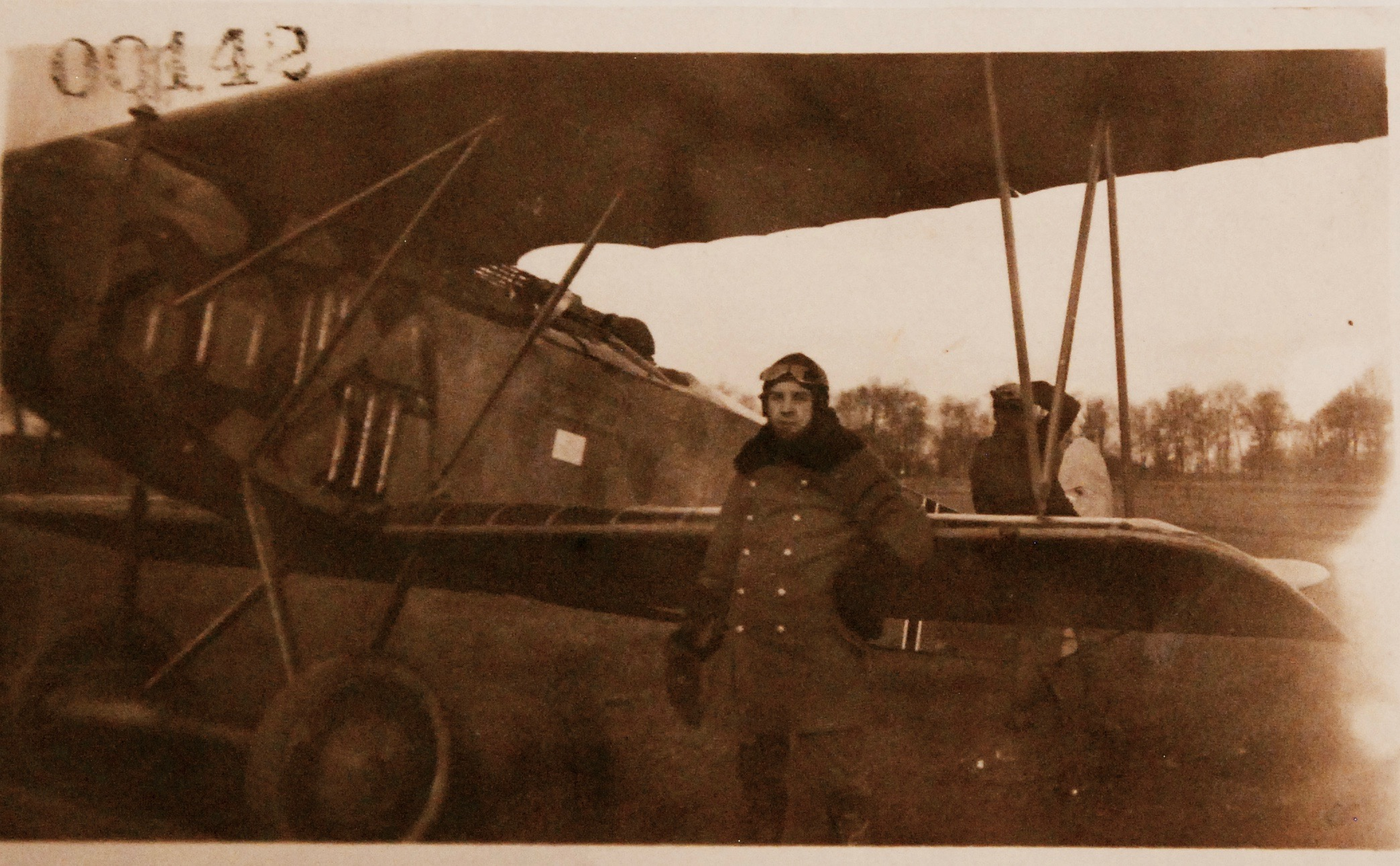
Karl Thom with Fokker D.VII

He marked his Albatros airplane's fuselage with a large black capital block 'T' with pronounced serifs to identify himself in the air. The 'T' was in addition to the customary squadron marking of a vertical black stripe and a vertical white stripe just aft of the cockpit; the 'T' itself was on the outside wall of the cockpit. Thom reeled off a string of 11 victories, including a triple win on 18 September, and doubles on 19 and 22 September.

October brought changes, as Jasta 21 received Oskar Freiherr von Boenigk as the new commanding officer and Fokker D.VIIs as new airplanes to replace the Albatros D.Vs that had been the squadron's craft.

On 11 October, Thom was awarded the Military Merit Cross, Prussia's and Germany's highest decoration for valorous enlisted men. He had previously been awarded the Member's class of the Royal House Order of Hohenzollern.

Thom scored only once that month, on 29 October.

November was a blank. He next scored on 1 December, with one confirmed and one unconfirmed victory.

On 23 December, Thom was wounded in action. He took a bullet in the leg while undertaking the usually hazardous duty of attacking an observation balloon. He was not successful in his assault, nor would he ever shoot down one of the gasbags.

Thom's return to the victory rolls roughly coincided with Jasta 21's adoption of Fokker D.VIIs, replacing its Albatros D.Vs.

Thom shot down five enemy aircraft in June, beginning with his 15th win overall on 11 June. July saw him victorious six more times, and he is sometimes credited with victory over the youngest son of President Theodore Roosevelt, Quentin Roosevelt on Bastille Day, 14 July 1918. He capped his career with a triumph each on 1 and 4 August. With 27 victories confirmed, he became the leading ace for Jasta 21. All but four of his victories were against the French.

On 11 August, he was severely wounded in the hip and remanded to hospital. He was also commissioned on 11 August 1918.

On 1 November, while he was still in the hospital, he was awarded the Pour le Mérite, Germany's highest award for commissioned officers.

On 6 November, he rejoined Jasta 21. Three days later, he crashed, suffering multiple fractures. Two days after that, the Armistice ended World War I.

== Post World War I ==
Karl Thom returned to the Luftwaffe to serve during World War II. He was Fliegerhorst-Kommandantur A (o) 4/I from July 1944- September 1944 and then Fliegerhorst-Kommandantur E (v) 217/I until October 1944.

His death is uncertain. He disappeared under obscure circumstances, on 3 March 1945 in Pillau, East Prussia.
