= Heibert =

Heibert is a surname. Notable people with the surname include:

- Al Hiebert (1938–2000), Canadian politician
- Augie Hiebert (1916–2007), American television executive
- Robert Heibert (1886–1933), German World War I flying ace

== See also ==
- Herbert (surname)
