= Jagdstaffel 21 =

Jasta 21
- Active: 1916–1918
- Country: German Empire
- Branch: Luftstreitkräfte
- Type: Fighter squadron
- Engagements: World War I

Royal Saxon Jagdstaffel 21 was a "hunting group" (i.e., fighter squadron) of the Luftstreitkräfte, the air arm of the Imperial German Army during World War I. As one of the original German fighter squadrons, the unit would score 148 verified aerial victories, including at least 30 destructions of enemy observation balloons.

In turn, their casualties for the war would amount to eight pilots killed in action, six wounded in action, and one fallen prisoner of war.

== History ==
Jagdstaffel 21 was founded on 25 October 1916, drawing from FA 40 and Kagohl 7 for its initial assignment of men. It was mobilized on 6 December 1916. It suffered its first casualty on 10 February 1917, and scored its first victory on 24 March 1917. It would serve through war's end. Two of its members would soldier on after war's end, and eventually wear general's stars in the Luftwaffe.

== Commanding officers (Staffelführer) ==
Eduard Ritter von Schleich

1. Richard Schlieben: 15 November 1916 – 26 May 1917
2. Eduard Ritter von Schleich: 26 May 1917 – 23 October 1917
3. Oskar Freiherr von Boenigk: 23 October 1917 – 27 August 1918
4. Josef Schulte: 27 August 1918 – 11 November 1918

== Aerodromes ==
1. AFP 3: 25 October 1916 – 15 November 1916
2. Neuflize, France: 15 November 1916 – 1 July 1917
3. Chassogne Ferme, Verdun, France: 1 July 1917 – 26 December 1917
4. Saint-Loup, France: 26 December 1917 – 10 January 1918
5. Saint-Mards, France: 10 January 1918 – 18 May 1918
6. Sissonne, France: 18 May 1918 – 6 June 1918
7. Boncourt, France: 6 June 1918 – 23 September 1918
8. Sissonne: 23 September 1918 – 11 October 1918
9. Plomion, France: 11 October 1918 – 11 November 1918

== Notable members ==
Jasta 21 was fortunate to spend most of its existence under a pair of leaders worthy of the Pour le Mérite and Iron Cross: Eduard Ritter von Schleich and Oskar Freiherr von Boenigk; the former also rated the Military Order of Max Joseph. Both would continue their military careers postwar, and ascend into the ranks of the generals.

The unit also had a third Pour le Mérite in its ranks in Karl Thom, who also had won the MMC, Royal House Order of Hohenzollern, and Iron Cross. Emil Thuy made the fourth Pour le Mérite winner in the squadron; he also had the Hohenzollern and Iron Cross.

There was a little coterie of balloon aces in Jasta 21. Foremost was Fritz Höhn, Hohenzollern and Iron Cross, although Max Kuhn and Heinrich Haase were also balloon buster aces.

Also notable in the squadron were Rudolf Matthaei, the Iron Cross winner who would move on to successfully command Jasta 46, and Werner Wagener, who won not only the Iron Cross, but also the Silver Wound Badge and the Austro-Hungarian MMC.

== Aircraft ==
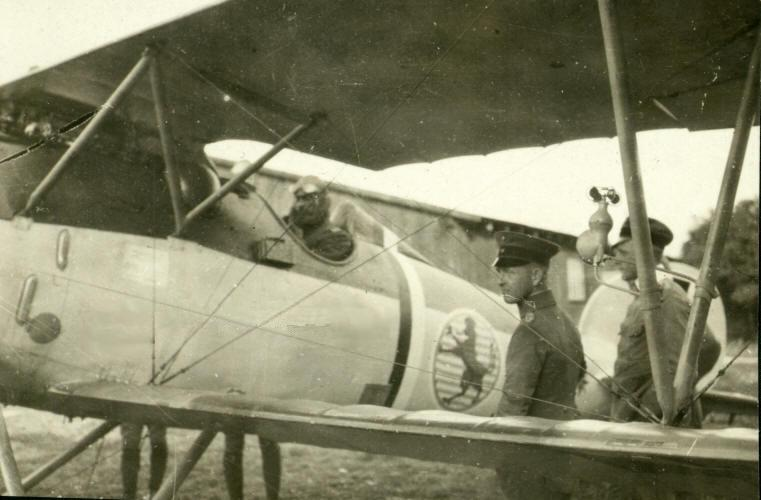
Schleich in his Albatros while commanding Jasta 21

The squadron used both Albatros and Pfalz fighters. Their squadron's basic paint scheme featured a black and white band circling the fuselage just aft of the cockpit, along with striped elevators.

It would begin to switch to Fokker D.VIIs in the early summer of 1918.

== Operations ==
When the squadron went operational on 6 December 1916, it was working on the 3rd Armee front. By July 1918, it had joined Jagdgruppe 5, and finished the war there.
