= Emil Schäpe =

- Born: 10 October 1890; Elbing, Germany
- Died: 7 January 1925 (aged 34); Lörrach
- Military career
- Allegiance: Germany
- Branch: Aviation
- Rank: Vizefeldwebel
- Units: Fliegerersatz-Abteilung 4 (Replacement Detachment 4), Fliegerersatz-Abteilung 8 (Replacement Detachment 8), Kampfgeschwader 5 (Tactical Bomber Wing 5), Kampfstaffel 25 (Tactical Bomber Squadron 25), Kampfstaffel 26 (Tactical Bomber Squadron 26), Schutzstaffel 8 (Protection Squadron 8), Jagdstaffel 5 (Fighter Squadron 5), Jagdstaffel 33 (Fighter Squadron 33)
- Awards: Iron Cross

Vizefeldwebel Emil Schäpe (10 October 1890 – 7 January 1925) was a German World War I flying ace credited with 18 aerial victories.

== Biography ==
See also Aerial victory standards of World War I

Emil Schäpe was born on 10 October 1890 in Elbing, Kingdom of Prussia, Germany.

Schäpe reported for his required military obligation on 16 October 1912, only to be discharged on 14 November. There is no information as to how he rejoined the military, but somehow he volunteered for aviation duty early in the First World War, and was sent for aviation training on 4 February 1915. He passed through primary and advanced schooling at Fliegerersatz-Abteilung 4 (Replacement Detachment 4), and Fliegerersatz-Abteilung 8 (Replacement Detachment 8) to serve in Kampfgeschwader 5 (Tactical Bomber Wing 5), Kampfstaffel 25 (Tactical Bomber Squadron 25), ending up in Kampfstaffel 26 (Tactical Bomber Squadron 26) on 2 October 1915.

He scored his first aerial victory while piloting a two-seater reconnaissance plane, on 22 October 1916. He scored another nine months later, on 28 July 1917, after transferring to a fighter unit, Jasta 33. It was nearly another year before he began scoring again, but he finally became an ace on 24 July 1918. He then ran off a string of 13 triumphs in October 1918.
