= Jagdstaffel 33 =

Jasta 33
- Active: 1916–1918
- Disbanded: December 1918
- Country: German Empire
- Branch: Luftstreitkräfte
- Type: Fighter squadron
- Part of: Jagdgruppe II; Jagdgruppe 7
- Engagements: World War I

Commanders
- Notable commanders: Carl-August von Schoenebeck

Royal Prussian Jagdstaffel 33 was a "hunting group" (i.e., fighter squadron) of the Luftstreitkräfte, the air arm of the Imperial German Army during World War I. As one of the original German fighter squadrons, the unit would score a minimum of 46 verified aerial victories (the squadron's records being grossly incomplete from August 1918 onwards).

In turn, their casualties for the war would amount to six pilots killed in action, seven wounded in action, and one killed in a noncombat crash.

== History ==
Royal Prussian Jagdstaffel 33 was formed on 14 December 1916 at the FEA 3 training facility at Gotha, Germany. It did not get into action until March 1917, but its first aerial victory followed shortly thereafter, on 24 April 1917. As part of the changing German tactics based on concentration of air power, the squadron was incorporated into Jagdgruppe II along with Jasta 7, Jasta 29, and Jasta 35 in August 1917; the new fighter wing was commanded by Otto Schmidt. Not quite a year later, in August 1918, Jasta 33 shifted to membership in Jagdgruppe 7, joining Jasta 28, Jasta 57 and Jasta 58 under the command of Emil Thuy. Jasta 33 then served past war's end, disbanding in December 1918.

== Commanding officers (Staffelführer) ==
1. Heinrich Lorenz: 4 March 1917 – 15 June 1917 (WIA)
2. Johann Hesselink: 18 June 1917 – 14 July 1917;
3. Heinrich Lorenz: 14 July 1917 – 24 June 1918;
4. Carl-August von Schoenebeck: 11 July 1918 – 11 November 1918.

== Aerodromes ==
Jasta 33 was based at the following aerodromes:

1. Gotha, Germany
2. Bühl, Saarburg
3. Villers-au-Tertre, France: 22 April 1917 – unknown date
4. Guise, France
5. Bavinchove, France
6. Wynghene
7. Sierenz-Muhlhausen, Germany
8. Burscheid, Germany
9. Bühl: February 1918 – unknown date
10. Roucourt
11. Ascq, France
12. Lomme-Lille, France: April 1918 – unknown date
13. Halluin, France
14. Ennemain, France
15. Neuflize, France: Early July 1918 – August 1918
16. Cantin, France: August 1918 – unknown date
17. Beuvry, France
18. Chièvres, Belgium
19. Champles, Belgium: 4 November 1918 – unknown date

== Notable members ==
Carl-August von Schoenebeck, winner of the Royal House Order of Hohenzollern and Iron Cross, was the most prominent of the aces who served with Jasta 33, as he rose to the rank of Major General during World War II. Emil Schäpe, another Iron Cross winner, also served with the unit. Robert Heibert was awarded the enlisted man's equivalent of the Pour le Merite, the Military Merit Cross, as well as the Iron Cross.

Other aces serving with the squadron were Heinrich Lorenz and Kurt Jacob.

== Aircraft ==
Jasta 33 operated the following aircraft:

- The Fokker Dr.I triplane entered service in August 1917.
- The Fokker D.VII was introduced to combat duty beginning in March or April 1918.

== Operations ==
The Jasta was tasked to the Armee-Abteilung A Front in March 1917. It moved to support of 4th Armee on 22 April 1917. After its incorporation into JG II, it bounced around using several different airfields during the latter part of 1917 and the beginning of 1918. By August 1918, after their shift into JG 7, they supported 17th Armee. They seem to have continued in this role through war's end.
