= Jagdgeschwader 132 =

Fighter Wing 132
- Jagdgeschwader 132
- Active: 1934–1938; 1938–1939
- Country: Nazi Germany
- Branch: Luftwaffe
- Garrison/HQ: Döberitz; Düsseldorf (staff, Second Group) and Köln-Ostheim
- Patron: Manfred von Richthofen (1935–1938); Albert Leo Schlageter (1938–1939)

Jagdgeschwader 132 (JG 132) was a fighter wing of Nazi Germany's Luftwaffe during the interwar period. Formed in 1934 under the cover of Reklamestaffel Mitteldeutschland des DLV. In 1938, the wing was renamed Jagdgeschwader 131 and in May 1939 became Jagdgeschwader 2 "Richthofen". The second formation of JG 132 in November 1938 was initiated by renaming Jagdgeschwader 234 to JG 132 which then became Jagdgeschwader 26 "Schlageter" in May 1939. I. Gruppe of JG 132 was given the honorary name "Richthofen", named after Manfred von Richthofen, in March 1935. With the reformation of JG 132 in November 1938, the Geschwader carried the honorary name "Schlageter", named after Albert Leo Schlageter.

== History ==
JG 132 was the oldest fighter unit of the Luftwaffe, its roots dating back to 1934. The first element of JG 132 formed was I. Gruppe (1st group) under the cover name Reklamestaffel Mitteldeutschland des DLV (Advertisement Squadron Middle Germany of the German Air Sports Association) on 1 May 1934 in Döberitz. The Gruppe was placed under the command of Major Robert Ritter von Greim. On 1 April 1935, II. Gruppe of JG 132 was created at Jüterbog-Damm Airfield in Jüterbog and placed under the command of Hauptmann Johann Raithel. The Geschwaderstab (headquarters unit) of JG 132 was established on 1 April 1936, making it the first Geschwaderstab of the Luftwaffe. Now a Major, Raithel was appointed JG 132s first Geschwaderkommodore (wing commander). Command of II. Gruppe was then handed to Major Carl-August von Schoenebeck. On 1 July 1938, III. Gruppe of JG 132 under the command of Major Ernst Bormann was formed at Jüterbog-Damm. Tenure of the Gruppe with JG 132 ended on 1 November 1938 when the unit was detached and became the II. Gruppe of Zerstörergeschwader 141 (ZG 141—141st Destroyer Wing). IV. Gruppe of JG 132 was also formed on 1 July 1938 and headed by Oberstleutnant Theo Osterkamp. The Gruppe left JG 132 on 3 November to form the nucleus of a new Jagdgeschwader, becoming the I. Gruppe of Jagdgeschwader 331 (JG 331—331st Fighter Wing) which later became the I. Gruppe of Jagdgeschwader 77 (JG 77—77th Fighter Wing). On 1 November 1938, JG 132 was renamed and became Jagdgeschwader 131 (JG 131—131st Fighter Wing).

On 1 November 1938, the same day JG 132 was renamed to JG 131, Jagdgeschwader 234 "Schlageter" (JG 234—234th Fighter Wing), under the command of Oberst Eduard Ritter von Schleich, was also renamed and became the second instance of JG 132. On 1 May 1939, JG 132 was again renamed and became Jagdgeschwader 26 "Schlager".

== Commanding officers ==
=== Wing commanders ===
• Major Johann Raithel	1 April 1936	–	8 June 1936
• Oberst Gerd von Massow	9 June 1936	–	1 November 1938

On 1 November 1938, JG 132 was renamed and became the newly formed JG 131 while on the same day elements of JG 234 became the second instance of JG 132.

• Oberst Eduard Ritter von Schleich	1 November 1938	–	1 May 1939

=== Group commanders ===
==== I. Gruppe of JG 132 ====
• Major Robert Ritter von Greim	1 May 1934	–	1 April 1935
• Major Kurt-Bertram von Döring	1 April 1935	–	1 April 1936
• Oberstleutnant Carl Vieck	1 April 1936	–	1 November 1938

On 1 November 1938, I. Gruppe of JG 132 was renamed and became the newly formed I. Gruppe of JG 131 while on the same day I. Gruppe of JG 234 became the second instance of I. Gruppe of JG 132.

• Major Gotthard Handrick	1 November 1938	–	1 May 1939

==== II. Gruppe of JG 132 ====
• Major Johann Raithel	1 April 1935	–	31 March 1936
• Major Carl-August von Schoenebeck	1 April 1936	–	30 September 1936
• Major Nikolaus Mayer	1 October 1936	–	31 March 1937
• Major Arthur Laumann	1 April 1937	–	31 July 1938
• Hauptmann Joachim-Friedrich Huth	1 August 1938	–	31 October 1938

On 1 November 1938, II. Gruppe of JG 132 became the I. Gruppe of ZG 141 while on the same day II. Gruppe of JG 234 became the second instance of II. Gruppe of JG 132.

• Hauptmann Werner Palm	1 November 1938	–	1 May 1939

==== III. Gruppe of JG 132 ====
On 1 November 1938, III. Gruppe of JG 132 became the II. Gruppe of ZG 141.

• Major Ernst Bormann	1 July 1938	–	31 October 1938

==== IV. Gruppe of JG 132 ====
On 3 November 1938, IV. Gruppe of JG 132 became the I. Gruppe of JG 331.

• Oberstleutnant Theo Osterkamp	1 July 1938	–	July 1938
• Hauptmann Johannes Janke	July 1938	–	31 October 1938
