= Werner Wagener =

World War I flying ace

- Born: 13 November 1894; Dessau, Germany
- Died: Unknown
- Military career
- Allegiance: Germany
- Branch: Aviation
- Rank: Leutnant
- Units: Jagdstaffel 38, Jagdstaffel 21; Jagdstaffel 39, Kampfeinsitzerstaffel 1, Kampfeinsitzerstaffel 5, Schutzstaffel 14
- Awards: Iron Cross, Wound Badge, Austro-Hungarian Military Merit Cross

Leutnant Werner Wagener (born 13 November 1894, date of death unknown) was a World War I flying ace credited with five aerial victories. As a Fokker Eindekker pilot, he was one of the first flying aces in history.

== Biography ==
See also Aerial victory standards of World War I

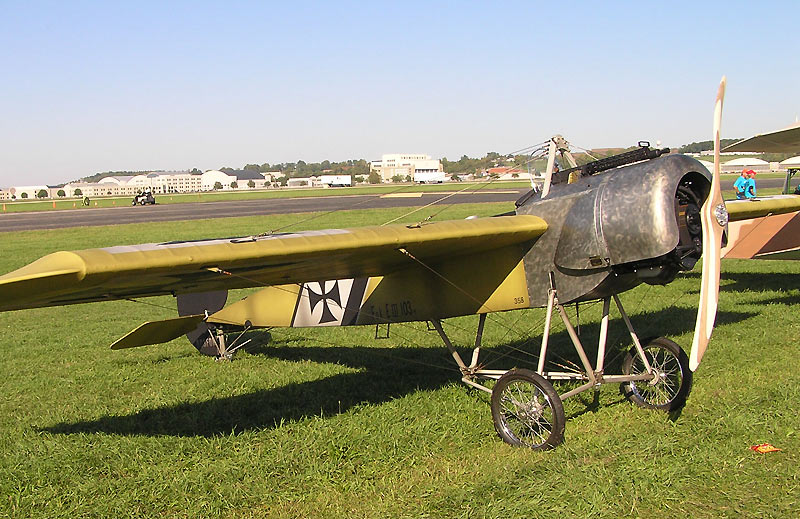
A Fokker-E III replica, similar to Wagener's original mount.

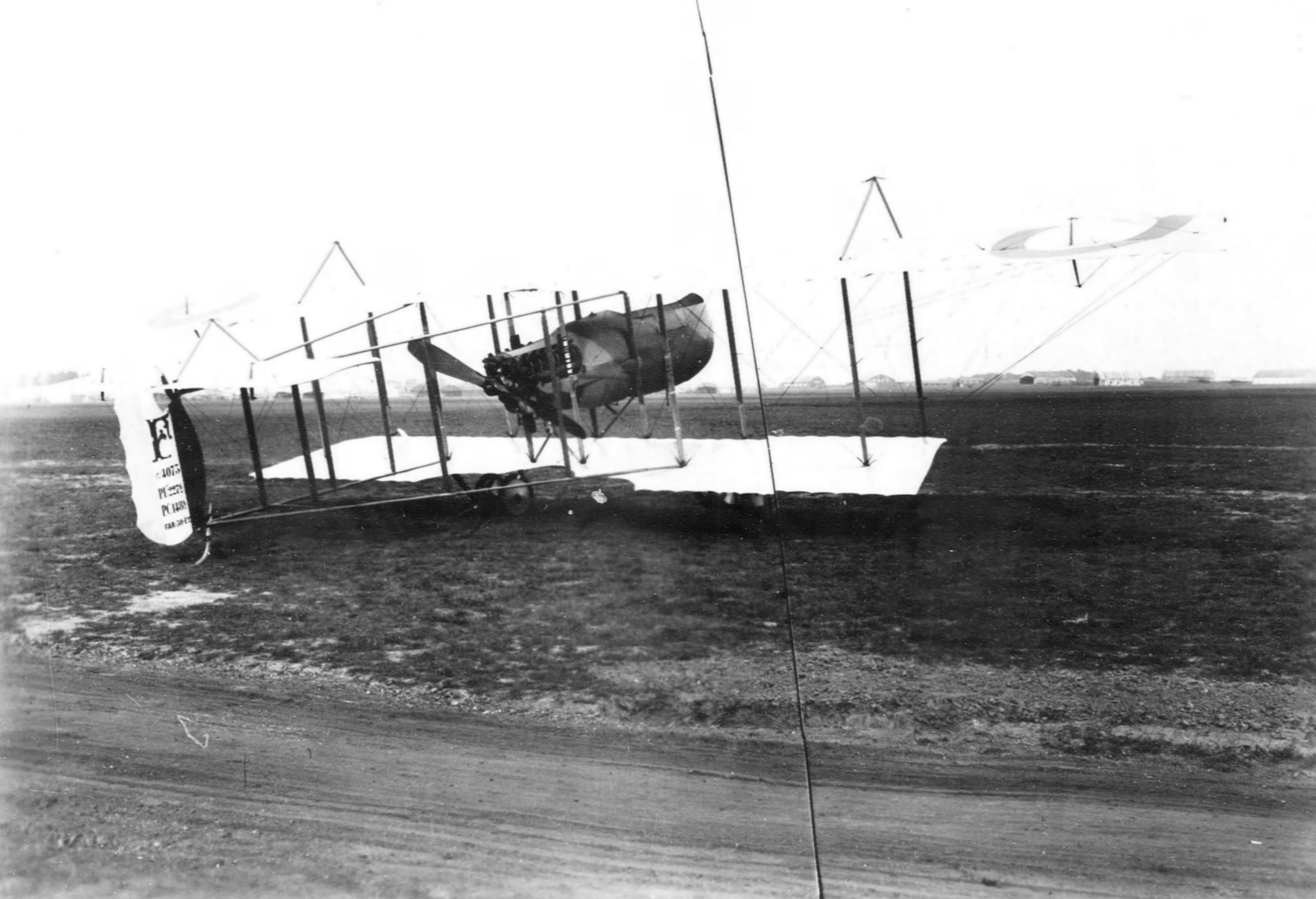
A Farman F40 was Wagener's first victim.

Werner Wagener was born in Dessau, Germany on 13 November 1894.

Wagener enlisted in the German military on 8 August 1914, serving in a rail service battalion. Wounded by shrapnel on 5 December, he returned from on 1 March 1915. Upon requesting a transfer to aviation service, he was forwarded for observer's training. Upon completion, he was forwarded to pilot's school.

On 24 July 1916, he was posted to the Macedonian front to join Jagdstaffel 38 as a pilot. He received one of the first German fighters for his use, a Fokker Eindekker. On 30 September 1916, he used this pioneering fighter to shoot down a Serbian Farman F40.

On 25 February 1917, he was transferred to the more modern aircraft of Jagdstaffel 21 on the Western Front in France. On 30 April, he scored his second victory, shooting down a Sopwith 1 1/2 Strutter. On 26 June, he was raised from the enlisted ranks as he was commissioned as a Leutnant.

On 19 August 1917, he was posted to Jagdstaffel 39, which was transferred to the Italian Front. While there, he claimed several aerial victories, three of which were confirmed. Then he was wounded in action on 25 November, and returned to France. Once there, he became a member of Kampfeinsitzerstaffel 1a tasked with defending Mannheim from bombing raids. He was subsequently transferred to similar defensive duties with Kampfeinsitzerstaffel 5 and with Schutzstaffel 14 while scoring no further victories.

== Awards ==
- Iron Cross, second class
- Iron Cross, first class
- Silver Wound Badge
- Austrian Military Merit Cross 3rd Class with Swords
