= Carl-August von Schoenebeck =

- Born: 19 January 1898; Bernstadt, Silesia, German Empire
- Died: 4 September 1989 (aged 91); Munich, Bavaria, Germany
- Military career
- Allegiance: German Empire; Nazi Germany
- Branch: Imperial German Army; Luftstreitkräfte; Luftwaffe
- Service years: 1915–1924, 1934–1945
- Rank: Major general
- Units: Baden Leib Grenadier Regiment; Flieger-Abteilung (Artillerie) (Flier Detachment (Artillery)) 203; Jagdstaffel 11; Jagdstaffel 59
- Commands: Jagdstaffel 33
- Conflicts: World War I World War II
- Awards: Royal House Order of Hohenzollern; Iron Cross
- Other work: civil pilot

Major General Carl-August von Schoenebeck (1898–1989) began his career in the Baden Leib-Grenadier Regiment in 1915. He transferred to the Luftstreitkräfte in 1916. After training, he served with the artillery cooperation unit FA (A) 203. His subsequent service in fighters (e. g. Jasta 11 earned him credit for eight confirmed aerial victories and a number of decorations, as well as the command of Jasta 33 while still a leutnant.

Postwar, he tried a trans-Atlantic flight to Chile in 1924. From 1930 to 1935, he was a test pilot. He joined the Luftwaffe in 1934. In 1938, he was promoted to lieutenant colonel and posted as air attaché to Yugoslavia. He became air attaché to Bulgaria in 1939, and held this position until after his promotion to major general in 1943. He was held as a prisoner of war from 1945 through the end of the war, and then illegally held until 1948, despite never having been suspected of or charged with war crimes.

He earned a multi-engine license to enter competition in 1954. He learned hang gliding at the age of 77, in 1975. He died on 4 September 1989 in Munich.

== Biography ==
=== Through World War I ===
Carl-August von Schoenebeck was born in Bernstadt, Silesia, German Empire on 19 January 1898. He enlisted in the Baden Leib Grenadier Regiment in 1915. He transferred to the Luftstreitkräfte in 1916 and underwent pilot's training with Fliegerersatz-Abteilung (Replacement Detachment) 3 in Gotha. After training, he was assigned to fly a two-seater on artillery direction missions with Flieger-Abteilung (Artillerie) (Flier Detachment (Artillery)) 203. Although there is no mention of fighter conversion training, Schoenebeck joined a fighter squadron, Jagdstaffel 11, on 7 July 1917.

His first victory was a notable one. On 27 July 1917, he shot down Sopwith Triplane number N5492, which had been used to score 23 victories (most by Raymond Collishaw), and killing Flight Sub-Lieutenant G. Roach of No. 10 Squadron RNAS. Four days later, he shot down a Royal Aircraft Factory RE.8 from No. 4 Squadron RFC over Frezenberg. It would not be until 3 September that he tallied another victory, when he shot down another Triplane at Hollebeke, Belgium.

Schoenebeck transferred to Jagdstaffel 59 on 26 January 1918. He scored one victory while with them, downing a Sopwith Camel on 9 May 1918. On 11 August 1918, he was promoted to command of Jagdstaffel 33. Between 23 August and war's end, he totalled four more confirmed victories, as well as four unconfirmed. Schoenebeck won several awards for his exploits, including both classes of the Iron Cross, the Knight's Cross with Swords of the House Order of Hohenzollern, and the Order of the Zahringer Lion.

=== Post World War I ===
Schoenebeck flew with Fighter Unit No. 424 of the Freikorps, fighting the Russians in the Baltic area; he was wounded in action at Mitau during 1919.

By 1924, he was working for Dornier; he flew a trans-Atlantic flight to Chile for them in the Dornier Do J seaplane.

From 1930 to 1935, he worked as a test pilot for both Heinkel and Arado. He also was an instructor during the covert founding of the Luftwaffe in Lipetsk, Russia. He joined the nascent Luftwaffe, becoming a Group Commander of the new Jagdgeschwader 132 "Richthofen" in 1936. He later served in Bulgaria as the Air Attache.

=== World War II and beyond ===
Schoenebeck rose to the rank of major general during 1944. He was captured in 1945, and spent until 1948 in captivity. He later founded the Luftfahrt-Technik Company, and represented such aircraft companies as Hiller Helicopters, Piper Aircraft, Bristol Aeroplane Company, and Beech Aircraft Corporation. In 1954, he earned a multi-engine pilot's license and entered international competitions.

In 1975, when 77 years old, he took up hang gliding. He died on 4 September 1989, in Munich.
