= Wolff von Stutterheim =

German general

- Born: 17 February 1893; Königsberg, German Empire
- Died: 3 December 1940 (aged 47); Berlin, Germany
- Burial place: Invalids' Cemetery, Berlin
- Military career
- Allegiance: German Empire; Weimar Republic; Nazi Germany
- Branch: Prussian Army; Luftwaffe
- Service years: 1912–1920; 1935–1940
- Rank: Generalmajor
- Commands: Kampfgeschwader 77
- Conflicts: World War I World War II
- Awards: Pour le Mérite; Knight's Cross of the Iron Cross

Wolff von Stutterheim (17 February 1893 – 3 December 1940) was a German Generalmajor.

Stutterheim was born in Königsberg, Germany. He came from an old military family which produced several generals and seven knights of the order Pour le Mérite. Eleven members of his family fell in action during World War I, including his father and two of his uncles. He was awarded the Pour le Mérite during World War I and the Knight's Cross of the Iron Cross during World War II.

Von Stutterheim was severely wounded in aerial combat over France while commanding Kampfgeschwader 77 on 15 June 1940. He died from his wounds in a Berlin hospital on 3 December 1940.

== Awards ==
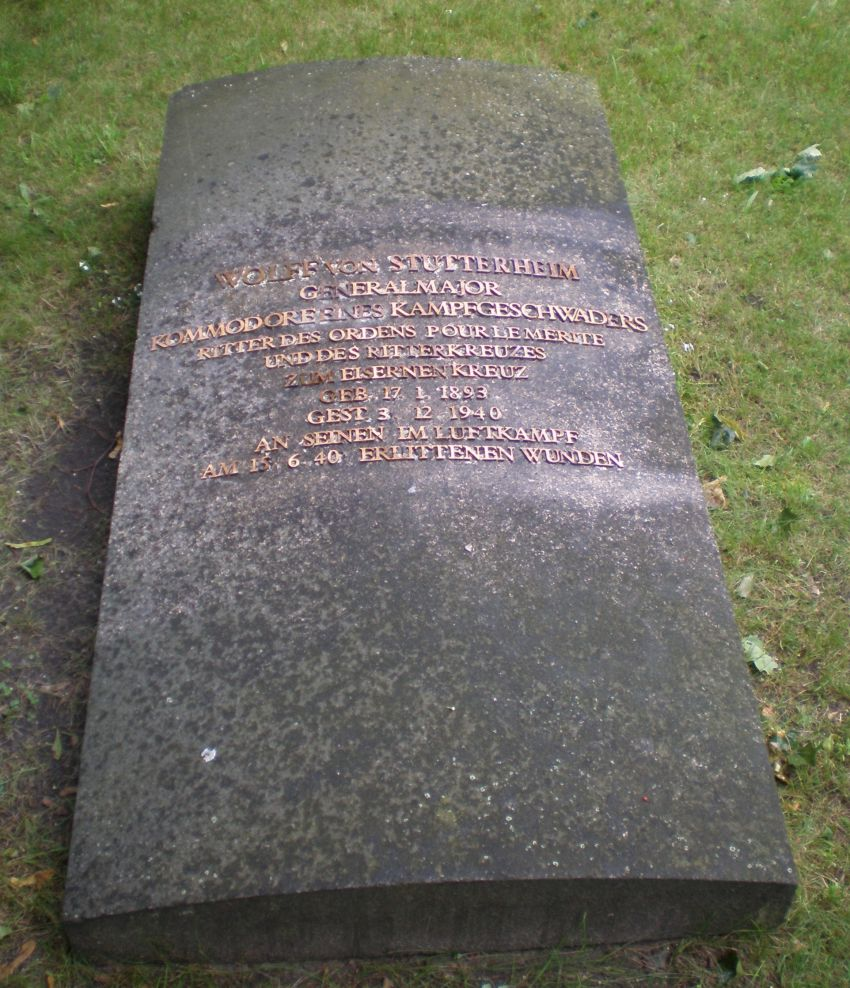
Grave at the Invalidenfriedhof, Berlin.

- Pour le Mérite (27 August 1918)
- Knight of the Royal House Order of Hohenzollern with Swords (31 October 1916)
- Iron Cross 2nd and 1st Class in February 1915
- Wound Badge in Gold
- Clasp to the Iron Cross 2nd and 1st Class
- Knight's Cross of the Iron Cross (4 July 1940)

Military offices
Preceded by Oberst Heinrich Seywald	Commander of Kampfgeschwader 77; 14 September 1939 – 20 March 1940	Succeeded by Oberst Dr. Johan-Volkmar Fisser
Preceded by Oberst Dr. Johan-Volkmar Fisser	Commander of Kampfgeschwader 77; 31 May 1940 – 15 June 1940	Succeeded by Generalmajor Heinz-Hellmuth von Wühlisch
