= Colin Rawlins =

British civil servant, businessman, and Royal Air force officer

Colin Guy Champion Rawlins, DFC (5 June 1919 – 23 October 2003) was a British civil servant, businessman, and decorated Royal Air force officer.

== Early life and education ==
Rawlins was born on 5 June 1919 in the Metropolitan Borough of Lewisham, London, England. His parents were R. S. C. Rawlins and Yvonne Blanche Andrews. He spent his early childhood in Brazil, living in Recife and Rio de Janeiro. When his mother died in 1924, he and his sister lived with relations in the Union of South Africa for the next two years. After his father remarried, the siblings moved to British Kenya to join their father and step-mother. He was educated at the Prince of Wales School in Nairobi while the family were living in Kenya. In 1933, the family moved back to England. He was educated at Charterhouse, then an all-boys public school in Godalming, Surrey, between 1933 and 1937.

In 1937, Rawlins matriculated into The Queen's College, Oxford to study modern languages. He represented Oxford University in swimming competitions in 1938 and 1939. Having also joined the Oxford University Air Squadron, he was called up for active service at the beginning of World War II.

== Career ==
=== Military service ===
Rawlins joined the Oxford University Air Squadron while studying at the University of Oxford. This meant his was able to learn to fly and train as an officer cadet of the Royal Air Force at the same time as studying for his degree. He was commissioned in the Royal Air Force Volunteer Reserve (RAFVR) on 1 November 1938 as a pilot officer.

At the beginning of World War II, Rawlins was called up for active service. He then received advanced pilot training at No. 8 Flying Training School RAF, RAF Montrose, and at No. 16 Operational Training Unit (a night bomber training unit), RAF Upper Heyford. He was promoted to flying officer on 1 May 1940. He then joined No. 144 Squadron RAF, flying Handley Page Hampden medium bomber. From August to December 1940, he serve a tour of operations with Bomber Command, flying night bombers over North-West Europe. He was awarded a Distinguished Flying Cross in February 1942 to for service during this period.

From January 1941 until his return to flying in May 1941, Rawlins was rested from active duty. On 1 May 1941, he was promoted to flight lieutenant (war substantive). On 12 May 1941, he was shot down near Enkhuizen, the Netherlands, by Helmut Woltersdorf.

=== Post-Military ===
Rawlins was Director of Zoos of the Zoological Society of London from 1966 to 1984.

== Honours ==

On 11 February 1941, Rawlins was awarded the Distinguished Flying Cross (DFC) "in recognition of gallantry displayed in flying operations against the enemy". For service during World War II, he was also awarded the 1939–1945 Star, the Air Crew Europe Star, and the War Medal 1939–1945. If he had lived to 2013, he would have received the Bomber Command Clasp which was belatedly instituted on 26 February of that year.
