= Jagdgeschwader 234 =

Fighter Wing 234
- Jagdgeschwader 234
- Country: Nazi Germany
- Branch: Luftwaffe

Jagdgeschwader 234 was a fighter wing of Nazi Germany's Luftwaffe in World War II. It operated during peacetime and conducted formation flying, simulated aerial combat, and firing on ground targets. Many of its pilots came from Jagdgruppe 88 (Legion Condor) operating in Spain during the Spanish Civil War.

== Organisation ==
Main article: Organisation of the Luftwaffe (1933–45)

A Luftwaffe Geschwader (wing formation) was the largest homogenous flying formation. It typically was made up of three groups (Gruppen). Each group contained approximately 30 to 40 aircraft in three squadrons (Staffeln). A Jagdgeschwader could field 90 to 120 fighter aircraft. In some cases a wing could be given a fourth gruppe. Each wing had a Geschwaderkommodore (wing commander) supporting by three Gruppenkommandeur (Group Commanders). Each squadron was commanded by a Staffelkapitän (squadron leader). The staffel contained approximately 12 to 15 aircraft. The identification in records were different depending on the type of formation. A Gruppe was referred to in roman numerals, for example I./JG 234, while Staffeln were described with their number (1./JG 234). The wing could be subordinated to a Fliegerkorps, Fliegerdivision or Jagddivision (Flying Corps, Division and Fighter Division) all of which were subordinated to Luftflotten (Air Fleets). The use of Fliegerdivision became redundant and the description Fliegerkorps supplanted it until the use of Jagddivision later in the war.

=== Formation ===
The Geschwader headquarters, Jagdgeschwader 234, and a new fighter Gruppe, II/JG 234 were formed at Düsseldorf in early 1937. The headquarters was left un-staffed for more than a year due to the rapid expansion of the Luftwaffe. III/JG 134 (known as the Köln Gruppe) was re-designated as the I/JG 234 with command being handed over to Hauptmann Walter Grabmann from Hauptmann Oskar Dinort. II./JG 234 was led by Major Eduard Ritter von Schleich, a Great War Pour le mérite winner known as the "Black Knight". I. Gruppe flew mainly the Heinkel He 51, while the II. Gruppe flew the Arado Ar 68. It wasn't until November 1937 that JG 234 received and fully equipped with the Messerschmitt Bf 109B.

The Geschwaderstab (headquarters unit) was formed on 1 November 1938 in Düsseldorf and placed under the command of Oberst Eduard Ritter von Schleich. On this day, the Geschwader was renamed to Jagdgeschwader 132 (JG 132–132nd Fighter Wing) and was subordinated to Luftgaukommando IV (Air District Command). Also, on this day, I. and II. Gruppe of JG 234 were placed under the command of JG 132 and were then referred to as I. and II. Gruppe of JG 132. The Geschwaderstab was equipped with the Bf 109 D-1. On 8 December 1938, JG 132 was given the unit name "Schlageter", named after Albert Leo Schlageter. Schlageter was former member of the Freikorps who was executed by the French for sabotage and then became a martyr cultivated by the Nazi Party.

== Commanding Officers ==
=== Geschwaderkommodore ===
• Oberst Eduard Ritter von Schleich "The Black Knight"	1 November 1938	–	1 December 1938	JG 234 renumbered to JG 132

=== Gruppenkommandeure ===
==== I. Gruppe of JG 234 (Containing 1st, 2nd, and 3rd Staffeln) ====
• Hauptmann Walter Grabmann	16 March 1937	–	10 May 1938	Left to take over Jagdgruppe 88 in Spain
• Hauptmann Karl-Heinz Leesmann	11 May 1938	–	12 July 1938	Interim Gruppenkommandeure
• Major Gotthard Handrick	13 July 1938	–	1 December 1938	I./JG 234 renumbered to I./JG 132

==== II. Gruppe of JG 234 (Containing 4th, 5th, and 6th Staffeln) ====
• Major Eduard Ritter von Schleich "The Black Knight"	15 May 1937	–	31 October 1938	Left to become Geschwaderkommodore
• Hauptmann Werner Palm	1 November 1938	–	27 June 1939	II./JG 234 renumbered to II./JG 132
