= Eduard Ritter von Schleich =

Bavarian flying ace (1888–1947)

- Schleich wearing his Pour le Mérite on his neck.
- Born: 9 August 1888; Munich, Kingdom of Bavaria, German Empire
- Died: 15 November 1947 (aged 59); Dießen am Ammersee, Bavaria, Allied occupied Germany
- Military career
- Allegiance: German Empire; Nazi Germany
- Branch: Infantry, Luftstreitkräfte, Luftwaffe
- Service years: 1909–1919, 1935–1944
- Rank: Lieutenant General
- Nickname: "The Black Knight"
- Units: Flieger-Abteilung 2, Jagdstaffel 21, Jagdstaffel 32, Jagdgeschwader IV, Jagdgruppe 8, Schutzstaffel 28
- Awards: Pour le Mérite, Iron Cross 1st & 2nd Class, Knight's Cross of the Military Order of Max-Joseph

Eduard-Maria Joseph Ritter von Schleich (9 August 1888 – 15 November 1947), born Schleich, was a high scoring Bavarian flying ace of the First World War. He was credited with 35 aerial victories at the end of the war. During the Second World War he served in the Luftwaffe as a general.

== Early life ==
Schleich was born in Munich, Kingdom of Bavaria on 9 August 1888, the son of Eduard, a landscape painter, and grandson of Eduard Schleich the Elder, another landscape painter. His family soon moved to the spa city of Bad Tölz. After he left school Schleich decided to enroll in the Royal Bavarian Army's cadet program and in 1909 was commissioned into the 11th Bavarian Infantry Regiment. Before the outbreak of the First World War, Schleich was plagued by medical problems and was released from active duty. He volunteered again, and on 25 August 1914 was badly wounded in the Battle of Lorraine.

== First World War ==
While Schleich was recovering from his wounds of August 1914 he decided to volunteer for the Royal Bavarian Air Service and was accepted for training as an observer. After service with FEA 1 on two-seaters, he applied for pilot training and qualified. In December 1915 he joined FA 2b, and in January 1916, during an observation flight, Schleich was wounded in the arm by an exploding anti-aircraft shell. Instead of returning to base, while still in the air he had his crewman bandage his wound and then completed his assignment. On 1 September, he assumed command of Fliegerschule 1. He joined Jagdstaffel 21 (Fighter Squadron 21) in May 1917 and commanded the unit from June onwards. He emblazoned his new Albatros D.V with a rampant lion insignia representing Bavaria.

When Leutnant Erich Limpert, his best friend on the Jasta, was killed in a dogfight, Schleich ordered his plane to be painted all black. This black plane soon led to Schleich being dubbed 'The Black Knight'.

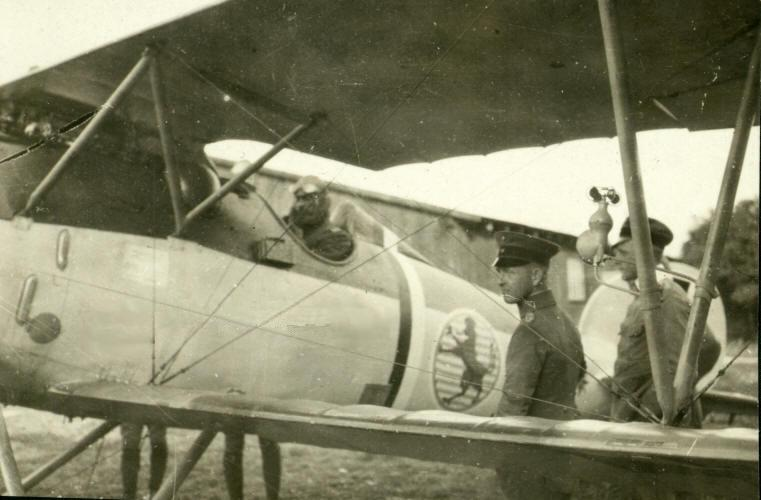
Schleich in his Albatros aircraft as leader of Jasta 21

In October 1917, the Imperial German Air Service reorganized, with the respective fighter squadrons being designated as Prussian, Saxon, or Bavarian. The squadrons were then stocked only with subjects from their respective provinces. Jagdstaffel 21 thus became a Saxon squadron, and Schleich being Bavarian, was transferred to command a Bavarian squadron, Jagdstaffel 32, with his tally of victories then at 25.

He was awarded the Pour le Mérite on 4 December 1917, and after a spell commanding Militaerfliegerschule 1, on 15 March 1918 he took command of Jagdgruppe Nr. 8, an ad hoc group consisting of Jastas 23, 34 and 35. By the war's end his score was 35. Having scored 29 of his 35 victories in the Albatros D.V, he's the most successful pilot in the type.

== Interbellum ==
Schleich was briefly hospitalised in Bad Reichenhall, regaining his strength after years of combat. In 1919, he was posted as an Inspector with the Bavarian Air Service, an aviation unit of the Bavarian State Police.

In April 1919, the German Communist Party forcibly gained control of Munich, and Schleich was marked for immediate arrest and trial. Government troops were able to oust the Communists the following month, returning Bavaria once again to the Weimar Republic.

After a short stint as a pilot with the Bavarian Police, Schleich became a liaison officer with the Army Peace Commission, responsible for the implementation of the Armistice terms.

Demobilised in December 1921, Schleich worked as a peat farmer, and later as an airline pilot. In 1922, he helped start the Bavarian Flying Club. In mid-October 1929, Schleich quit his pilot's position with Lufthansa. At about the same time, he founded the Light Airplane Club in Munich. One of his students as a flight instructor was the German actor Heinz Rühmann.

Schleich joined the Nazi Party on 1 April 1931, and the SS with the rank of SS-Sturmbannführer. From 1 October 1931 to 15 April 1934 he led the SS-Fliegerstaffel, a paramilitary flying organization. He was given control of the Hitler Youth flying programmes, and promoted to General. At the November 1933 parliamentary election, Schleich was elected as a Nazi Party deputy to the Reichstag from electoral constituency 26, Franconia. He served only one term, not standing for reelection in March 1936.

With the creation of the Luftwaffe in 1935, Schleich returned to military service with the rank of a Major, overseeing the training of air reserve units and of dive-bombing pilots. On 1 August 1937, Schleich was appointed Gruppenkommandeur (group commander) of II. Gruppe (2nd group) of Jagdgeschwader 234 "Schlageter" (JG 234—234th Fighter Wing), replacing Major Gerhard Nielsen. On 1 November, this Gruppe became II. Gruppe of Jagdgeschwader 132 "Schlageter" (JG 132—132nd Fighter Wing). There, he was appointed Geschwaderkommodore (wing commander) on 1 November 1938.

Schleich was promoted to Oberst and JG 132 was tasked with defending the western frontier of Germany. On 1 May 1939, JG 132 was re-designated to Jagdgeschwader 26 "Schlageter" (JG 26—26th Fighter Wing). The wing saw only limited service during the initial phases of the Second World War.

== Second World War ==
As a Generalmajor, Schleich became the commander of the fighter pilot school (Jagdfliegerschule 5) at Wien-Schwechat, Nazi occupied Austria, in December 1939. In late 1940 he was sent to Romania as part of the Luftwaffe Mission, assisting in the organization and training of the Romanian Air Force.

In mid-1941, Schleich became Commander of the Occupation Forces in Denmark, remaining nearly two and a half years there. On 29 August 1943, as the Germans launched Operation Safari to disarm the Danish military, von Schleich commanded the attack on Sorgenfri Palace, a royal residence in the Copenhagen suburbs, resulting in a firefight and the death of seven Germans.

Schleich's final assignment was Luftwaffe Ground Forces Commander in Norway, a post he held until late 1944. The regional command was disbanded in September, nine months after he arrived. Placed onto the reserve list in mid-November, Schleich eventually retired as a Generalleutnant.

Eduard Ritter von Schleich died on 15 November 1947, aged 59 years, from a heart condition. Schleich was buried in Diessen am Ammersee, near Munich.

== Decorations ==
- Prussian Iron Cross of 1914
  - 2nd Class: 25 October 1914
  - 1st Class: 1 April 1916
- Bavarian Military Merit Order 4th Class with Swords: 28 March 1916
- Prussian Order Pour le Mérite: 5 December 1917
- Bavarian Military Merit Order with Crown and Swords: 9 December 1917
- Bavarian Knight's Cross of the Military Order of Max Joseph: 7 July 1918
- Saxony's Order of Albert 2nd Class with Swords: 29 July 1918
- The Honour Cross of the World War 1914/1918
- Pilot's Badge German Empire

== Endnotes ==
Military offices
Preceded by none	Commander of Jagdgeschwader 26 Schlageter; 1 November 1938 – 9 December 1939	Succeeded by Major Hans Hugo Witt
Preceded by none	Commanding General of the Luftwaffe in Denmark; 12 June 1941 – 1 May 1944	Succeeded by Generalmajor Andreas Nielsen
Preceded by General Josef Kammhuber	Commanding General of the Luftwaffe in Norway; 10 October 1944 – 15 November 1944	Succeeded by Generalleutnant Ernst-August Roth
