= Robert Heibert =

- Born: 8 January 1886; Oberfell, Rhine Province, Prussia, German Empire
- Died: 10 May 1933 (aged 47)
- Military career
- Allegiance: Germany
- Branch: Army; aviation
- Service years: 1914–1918
- Rank: Offizierstellvertreter
- Units: Flieger-Abteilung (Artillerie) (Flier Detachment (Artillery)) 207; Feldflieger Abteilung (Field Flier Detachment) 227; Jagdstaffel 33 (Fighter Squadron 33); Jagdstaffel 46 (Fighter Squadron 46)
- Conflicts: Battle of Verdun
- Awards: Military Merit Cross, Iron Cross

Offizierstellvertreter Robert Heibert MMC IC (8 January 1886 – 10 May 1933) was a German flying ace during World War I. He was credited with 13 confirmed aerial victories; he also had seven unconfirmed claims.

== Early life and service ==
Heibert was a native of Oberfell in the Mosel region, being born there on 26 January 1886. He joined the German army in August 1914.

== World War I ==
He transferred to aerial duty in May 1915 and began service as a two-seater pilot on artillery cooperation duty with FA(A) 207 in October. He then transferred to FA(A) 207. He was active in the skies over Verdun. He then became a fighter pilot, and beginning 17 August 1917 was stationed with Jagdstaffel 33. He enjoyed his first aerial success there, downing a Sopwith northeast of Diksmuide on 20 August 1917. After a transfer on 17 December 1917 to help found Jagdstaffel 46, he resumed his winning ways with a double win on 16 February 1918. He would run off a string of ten more confirmed wins through 9 August, including busting two balloons on 1 August. He ended the war with 13 victories certified; some or all of the seven more unconfirmed victories may have failed to gain approval as the German administrative system bogged down in the war's ending days.

After winning both classes of the Iron Cross, Robert Heibert was awarded the highest award for valor available to a German enlisted man, the Military Merit Cross on 5 July 1918. He had been wounded four times, which should have qualified him for a Silver Wound Badge, though no award to him has been reported. He also received his final promotion in military rank in July 1918. Heibert would survive the war.

== Post World War I ==
Heibert committed suicide on 10 May 1933.
