= Helmut Woltersdorf =

German World War II fighter pilot

- Born: 15 November 1915; Friedberg, Germany
- Died: 2 June 1942 (aged 26); Wadden Sea, Netherlands
- Burial place: Ysselsteyn German war cemetery, Netherlands
- Military career
- Allegiance: Nazi Germany
- Branch: Luftwaffe
- Service years: 1934–1942
- Rank: Oberleutnant (first lieutenant)
- Unit: II./ZG 141, I./ZG 76, 4./NJG 1
- Conflicts: World War II: Polish Campaign; Norwegian Campaign; Battle of Britain; Defence of the Reich
- Awards: German Cross in Gold (18 May 1942)

Helmut Woltersdorf (15 November 1915 – 2 June 1942) was a German Luftwaffe flying ace and night fighter ace of the World War II. Woltersdorf is credited with 24 victories, including 20 Royal Air Force (RAF) bomber aircraft. Woltersdorf claimed eight victories as Zerstörer (destroyer or heavy fighter) pilot operating the Messerschmitt Bf 110 and 16 as a night fighter pilot—including 15 at night and one in daylight. Woltersdorf also flew Dornier Do 215 night fighter.

== World War II ==
Woltersdorf initially joined II. Gruppe (2nd Group) Zerstörergeschwader 141 (Destroyer Wing 141), based at Padubitz until May 1939, when it was renamed I.Zerstörergeschwader 76. Woltersdorf made his first claim on 2 September 1939 over Poland during the German invasion when he escorted Dornier Do 17s he shot down a Polish Air Force PZL P.11 fighter. He was to score his second victory against this type on 9 September. During the Norwegian Campaign, in April 1940, Woltersdorf scored four victories against Royal Air Force (RAF) Vickers Wellington bombers, two on the 12 April. They were claimed near Stavanger, Norway and one was identified as No. 38 Squadron RAF P9296. Piloted by Squadron Leader Maurice Nolan. Two killed in action four captured. A further two claims were made on 30 April 1940.

During the Battle of Britain Woltersdorf claimed two Supermarine Spitfires on 15 August 1940 Claimed near Blyth, Northumberland, England. The claim cannot be verified. No Spitfire was shot down or damaged in this air battle in this area on this day. Only one RAF fighter was lost in north-eastern England throughout the 15 August—Pilot Officer K.S Law of No. 605 Squadron RAF was wounded in action after crash-landing his Hawker Hurricane. Woltersdorf's unit claimed nine victories.

=== Night fighting ===
Woltersdorf was posted to 4./Nachtjagdgeschwader 1 (1st Squadron of Night Fighter Wing 1). On 12 May 1941 Woltersdorf claimed a Handley Page Hampden over Enkhuizen at 02:57. Identified as Hampden AD900 (PL-?) attacking Hamburg. Crashed at Hoogkarspel. The pilot Acting Squadron Leader Colin Guy Champion Rawlins of No. 144 Squadron RAF was wounded and captured. On 24/25 June 1941 he claimed his second night victory against another Wellington north of Schiermonnikoog at 01:40.

On the night of 6/7 July 1941 Woltersdorf, now flying a Dornier Do 215B-5 night fighter equipped with the infra-Red "Spanner-Anlage" detection apparatus, detected a Wellington and shot it down west of Texel at 03:43. He was hit by return-fire and Woltersdorf ditched his aircraft into the Wadden Sea. In October 2007 the Dornier was discovered largely intact. Woltersdorf was moved 7 staffel and claimed a victory against a Wellington over Ruurlo at 00:11 on 7 September 1941. The following night at 01:22 on the 8 September, Woltersdorf claimed another Wellington shot down northeast of Nienborg. Twelve days later, at 22:46 west of Hengelo, Woltersdorf claimed his sixth night victory over another Wellington. On 29 December 1941 Woltersdorf claimed a Handley-Page Hampden 22:45 near Winterswijk. It has been identified as the No. 408 Squadron RCAF Hampden piloted by Pilot Officer Stuart Brackenbury who was captured.

On the night of the 9/19 March 1942, east Münster, Woltersdorf accounted for another Wellington. On 26 March 1942, while flying a Dornier Do 215, Woltersdorf claimed an Avro Manchester at 00:32 near Bocholt, Germany. It was possibly the aircraft, L7465, piloted by Sergeant Markides from No. 207 Squadron RAF. All seven of the crew were killed. The victory was recorded on the Dornier's gun camera, which shows the aircraft engulfed in flames. The clock records 00:09:30 as the time of the victory. It has also been suggested his victim was L7497, Code QK, of No. 61 Squadron RAF crashed killing all seven crew members; Sergeants C. G Furby, J.R Dow (RCAF), J. E Smart, D. C Brockley, J. Buckley, W. A Roberts, H. H Fetherston. The bomber crashed in Wertherbruch only several miles from Bocholt.

Woltersdorf scored again on 6/7 April 1942 when he claimed a Wellington southwest of Zwolle at 04:13. The victim was probably a Hampden from No. 455 Squadron RAAF, coded UB-T, which was flying an operation Essen. Sergeant A. H Wincott, Flying Officer T. E Roberts, Sergeant C. Gammie and Sergeant K. W McIlrath were all killed in action. It was the first of several claims made by Woltersdorf this month. On 21 April 1942 he was the only Luftwaffe night fighter pilot to claim a victory over a Lockheed Ventura at 14:02 in an unknown location. On 24/25 April Wolterdorf downed an Avro Manchester south of Ameland at 23:32.

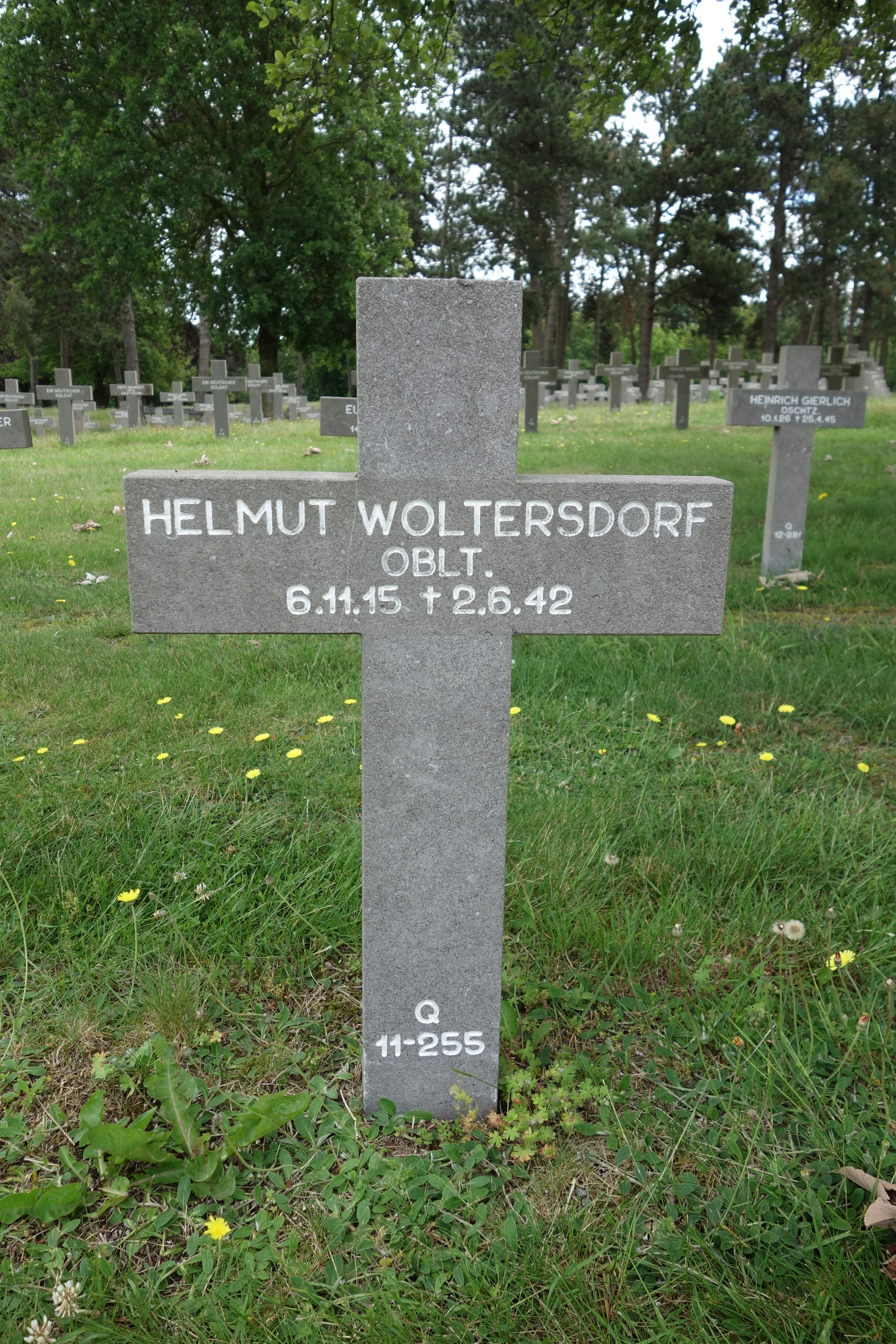
German War Cemetery Ysselsteyn - Helmut Woltersdorf

On the night of the 30/31 May 1942, Air Officer Commanding RAF Bomber Command, Arthur Harris, began his campaign of area bombing over Germany. It was the first of the 1,000-bomber air raids and it targeted the city of Cologne. Woltersdorf scrambled to intercept the armada in a Messerschmitt Bf 110. Southeast of Apeldoorn he spotted, engaged and shot down a Wellington at 02:25. Thirty minutes later southeast of Zutphen he claimed another Wellington. One of these machines was Wellington Mk. Ic N2894, code AA-?, of No. 75 Squadron RNZAF. Pilot Officer David Malcolm Johnson, Warrant Officer Oldrich Jambor (a Czech co-pilot), Flight Lieutenant Hector Austin Charles Batten, Flight Sergeants Josiah Robert Connor and John McKenzie Mclean were killed. Only G. J. Waddington-Allwright survived to be taken prisoner of war.

On 1/2 June 1942 Woltersdorf intercepted a Handley-Page Halifax southeast of Winterswijk and claimed it shot down at 02:08. Soon after this contact, Woltersdorf was shot down and killed in turn by a Hawker Hurricane piloted by New Zealander Sergeant Peter Gawith of No. 3 Squadron. The RAF unit had been conducting night fighter sorties over Europe since 11 December 1941. Gawith survived just two more months. On 28 July he was posted as missing in action over Noordwijk, Netherlands.

== Awards ==
- German Cross in Gold on 18 May 1942 as Oberleutnant in the 7./Nachtjagdgeschwader 1
