= Dornier Do 215 =

Light bomber aircraft in Germany

Do 215
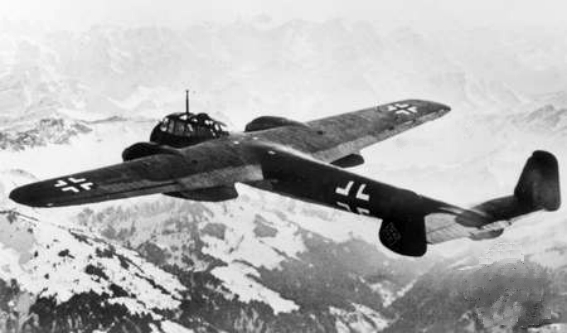
- Dornier Do 215 in flight

General information
- Type: Light bomber/Night fighter
- National origin: Germany
- Manufacturer: Dornier Flugzeugwerke
- Designer: Claude Dornier
- Primary user: Luftwaffe
- Number built: 102

History
- Manufactured: 1939–1941
- Introduction date: 1939
- First flight: 1938
- Retired: 1944
- Developed from: Dornier Do 17

The Dornier Do 215 was a light bomber, aerial reconnaissance aircraft and later a night fighter, produced by Dornier originally for export, but in the event most served in the Luftwaffe. Like its predecessor, the Dornier Do 17, it inherited the title "The Flying Pencil" because of its slim fuselage. The successor of the Do 215 was the Do 217.

== Design and development ==
The Do 17 fast bomber elicited renewed interest from foreign air forces (after the initial Do 17K series production). It was the interest shown by Yugoslavia in the Do 17Z which gave rise to the designation Dornier Do 215, allotted for no apparent reason to the Do 17Z sent to Yugoslavia for demonstration purposes in July 1937.

Dornier therefore prepared a pre-series Do 17 Z-0 as a demonstrator for export customers. It was given the civil registration D-AAIV. While this aircraft was essentially identical to the production Do 17Z, the Reichsluftfahrtministerium assigned the designation Do 215 to the export version. However, in spite of the Do 215 being designated as an export version, many Do 215s were used by the Luftwaffe.

The first prototype, Do 215 V1, retained the nine-cylinder Bramo 323 Fafnir radial engine of the Do 17Z. It crashed during testing. The second prototype, Do 215 V2, was equipped with the Gnome-Rhône 14-NO radial engine. It safely completed testing, but did not attract export orders because it did not offer a notable performance increase over the Do 17Z. The third prototype, Do 215 V3, used a 1,175 PS (1,159 hp) Daimler-Benz DB 601 Ba inline engine. In 1937, Dornier had used the earlier Daimler-Benz DB 600 powerplants in the Do 17L and Do 17M subtypes. The Do 215 V3, which first flew in the spring of 1939, demonstrated a noticeable improvement in flight performance compared to the earlier prototypes.

Series production of the Do 215 A-1 began in 1939. The order, intended for the Swedish Air Force, was stopped in August 1939, due to the political situation. The 18 extant aircraft were embargoed and pressed into Luftwaffe service upon the outbreak of World War II.

Some modifications were made and the resulting aircraft were redesignated as Do 215 B-0 through Do 215 B-5. This was the standard production version. According to official figures, 105 Do 215s were produced between 1939 and 1941 by Dornier in its factory at Oberpfaffenhofen.

== Operational history ==
The Do 215 was employed by the Aufklärungsgruppe des Oberbefelshabers der Luftwaffe (Aufk.Gr.Ob,d,L.) which was a special, strategic reconnaissance unit within the Luftwaffe, operating a very rare mix of aircraft types, often prototypes or aircraft built to their special requirements in very limited numbers. They flew on clandestine missions in civil markings over countries with whom Germany was not yet at war, or on challenging long-range strategic missions far behind enemy lines. This unit would also participate in developing technology and procedures for operational high-altitude missions. The Luftwaffe initially operated the Do 215 as a bomber and reconnaissance aircraft. Aircraft equipped with Rb 20/30 and Rb 50/30 cameras were used for long-range reconnaissance missions, primarily at the Ob.d.L (Oberkommando der Luftwaffe). Later aircraft operated as night fighters. The last of the Do 215s were retired in late 1944.

== Variants ==
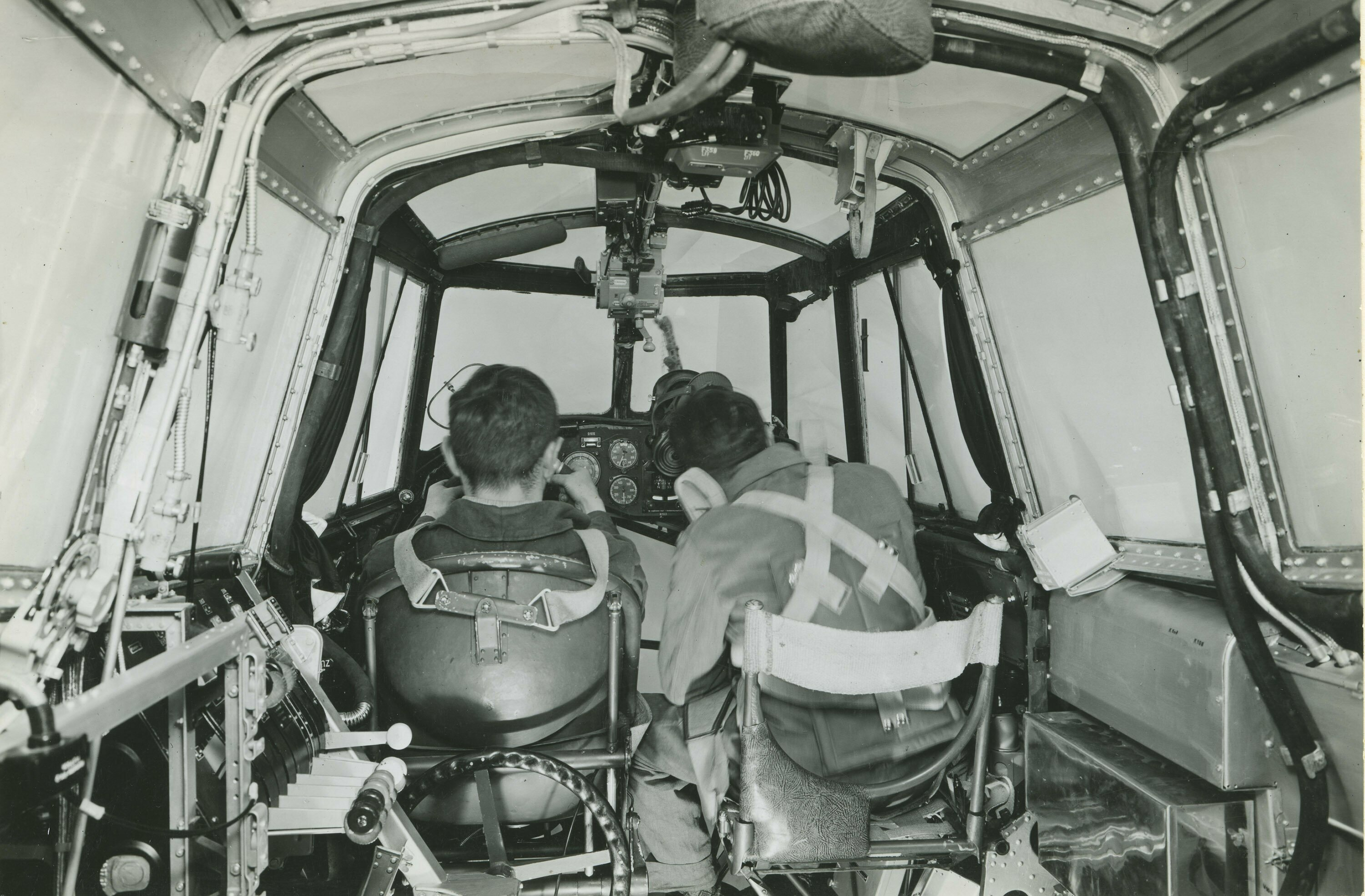
Aircraft cockpit

Do 215 V1
Dornier Do 17 Z-0 used as first prototype of Do 215 and crashed during trials.
Do 215 V2
Dornier Do 17 Z-0 (D-AIIB) equipped with Gnome-Rhône 14-cylinder radial engines and used as second prototype of Do 215.
Do 215 V3
Third prototype of Do 215, equipped with Daimler-Benz DB 601Ba inline engines.
Do 215 A-1
Designation of original 18 aircraft built for Swedish Air Force order.
Do 215 B-0
Three aircraft of A-1 version re-equipped for Luftwaffe with FuG 10 and operated for bomber/reconnaissance duties.
Do 215 B-1
Renamed remaining 15 aircraft of A-1 version operated by Luftwaffe.
Do 215 B-2
Rebuilt with sliding cover under bomb bay and equipped with three Rb 50/30 cameras in bomb bay used for reconnaissance missions.
Do 215 B-3
Two aircraft similar to B-1 sold to Soviet Union.
Do 215 B-4
Improved reconnaissance version developed from B-2 version and equipped with Rb 20/30 & Rb 50/30 cameras.
Do 215 B-5
Night fighter version called Kauz III. 20 aircraft converted from B-1 and B-4 versions with Do 17 Z-10 "Kauz II" nose-equipped with IR searchlight for the Spanner infrared detection system. Do 215 B-5s were armed with four 7.92 mm (.312 in) MG 17 machine guns grouped above the IR light and two 20 mm MG FF cannon in the lower nose. The Spanner system proved to be useless and the Lichtenstein 202 B/C radar was installed on some aircraft starting from the middle of 1942.

Of the versions of the Do 215 that existed, the A-1 bomber with DB 601 engines, and the B-0 and B-1 export machines were both re-equipped with FuG 10 navigation devices for the Luftwaffe. The Do 215 B-5 was the first night fighter to be equipped with the FuG 202 Lichtenstein B/C navigation device. These aircraft saw action from January 1941 to May 1944 with I. and IV./NJG 1 and II./NJG 2.

== Operators ==
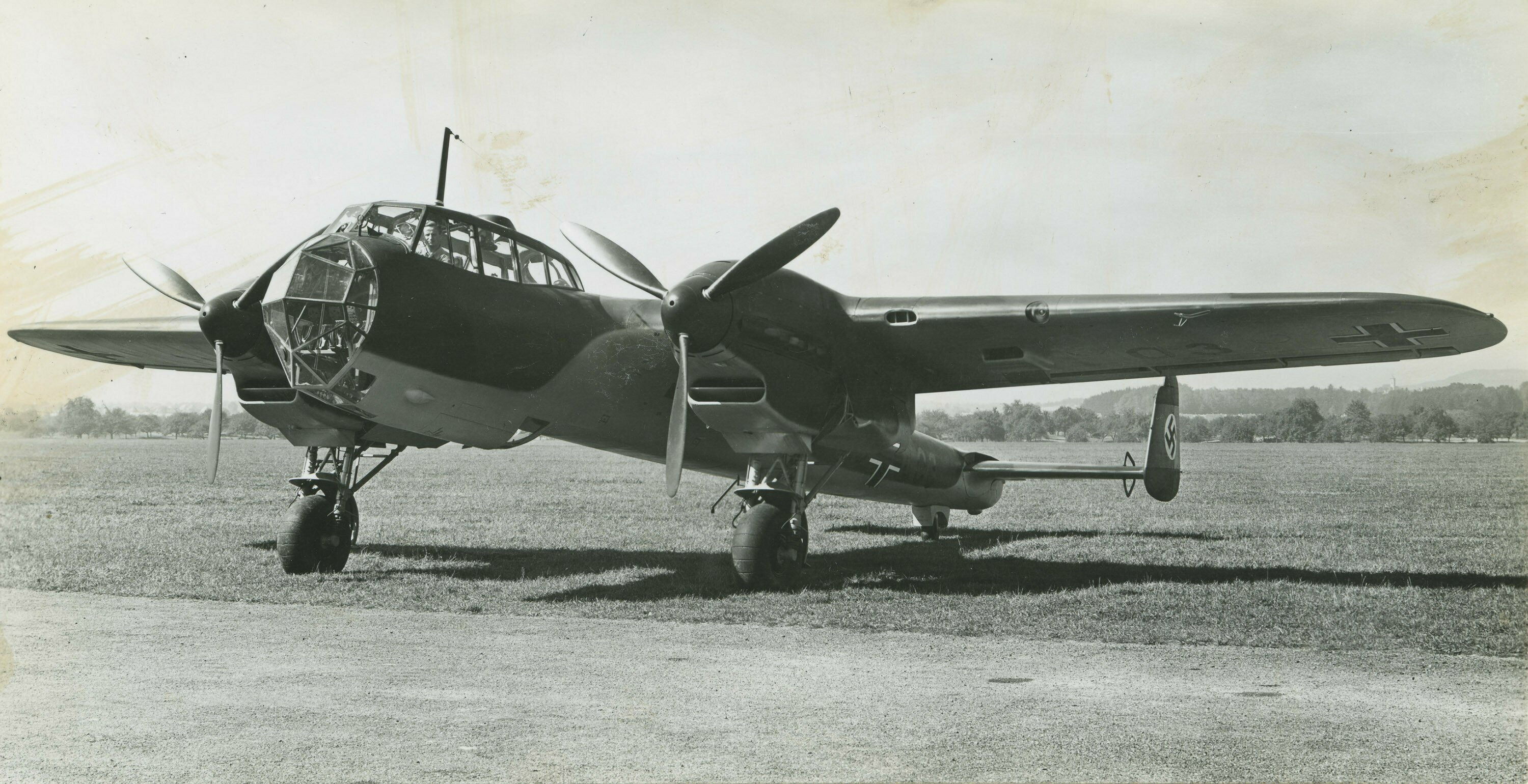
Dornier Do 215

Wartime operators
Germany

- Luftwaffe

Hungary

- Royal Hungarian Air Force operated at least 11 aircraft.

Soviet Union

- Soviet Air Force bought two aircraft from Germany.

Planned operators
Sweden

- Swedish Air Force ordered 18 Do 215 A-1s but the aircraft were embargoed and transferred to the Luftwaffe.

Kingdom of Yugoslavia

- Yugoslav Royal Air Force ordered Do 215s, but due to the start of World War II the order was never completed.

Netherlands

- In summer 1939 the Luchtvaartafdeeling (Netherlands Army Air Force) planned to buy 24 to replace the Fokker T.V which suffered reliability problems with its engines and propellers.

== Surviving aircraft ==
Until recently, none of the Dornier twin-engined bomber variants were thought to have survived. In September 2007, a Dornier Do 215 B was found largely intact in the shallow waters of the Waddenzee, the Netherlands. This aircraft was flown by a Luftwaffe fighter ace Helmut Woltersdorf. On the night of 6/7 July 1941, Woltersdorf shot down a Vickers Wellington, but his Dornier was damaged by return fire and crash-landed off the Dutch Coast. The area where the Dornier came down was named as a seal sanctuary and thus it escaped the attentions of scrap merchants and souvenir hunters. At low tide the aircraft becomes visible.

The Aircraft Recovery Group from the Airwar Museum at Fort Veldhuis in Heemskerk received permission to partially recover the Do 215. The only missing part of the aircraft is the tail section which lies 70 ft (21 m) to the rear of the main wreckage. The Daimler-Benz DB 601 engines were recovered along with the starboard portion of the cockpit.

== Specifications (Dornier Do 215 B-1) ==
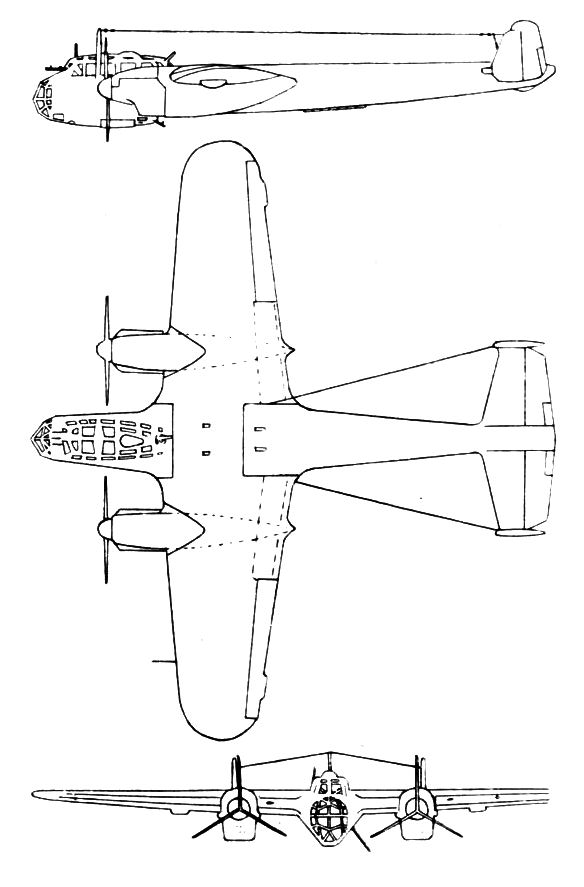
3-view drawing from L'Aerophile, August 1939

Data from Profile Publications 164, The Dornier Do 17 & 215 and German Aircraft of the Second World War

General characteristics

- Crew: 4
- Length: 15.8 m (51 ft 10 in)
- Wingspan: 18 m (59 ft 1 in)
- Height: 4.56 m (15 ft 0 in)
- Wing area: 55 m^{2} (590 sq ft)
- Airfoil: root: NACA 2218; tip: NACA 2209
- Empty weight: 4,739 kg (10,448 lb)
- Gross weight: 9,200 kg (20,283 lb)
- Fuel capacity: 1,550 L (410 US gal; 340 imp gal) in two wing tanks + optional 875 L (231 US gal; 192 imp gal) auxiliary tank in the bomb bay
- Powerplant: 2 × Daimler-Benz DB 601Aa V-12 inverted liquid-cooled piston engines, 820 kW (1,100 hp) each
- Propellers: 3-bladed constant-speed propellers

Performance

- Maximum speed: 470 km/h (290 mph, 250 kn) at 5,000 m (16,000 ft)
- Cruise speed: 410 km/h (250 mph, 220 kn)
- Range: 1,553 km (965 mi, 839 nmi)
- Service ceiling: 9,500 m (31,200 ft)
- Rate of climb: 6.0 m/s (1,180 ft/min)
- Wing loading: 167 kg/m^{2} (34 lb/sq ft)
- Power/mass: 0.178 kW/kg (0.108 hp/lb)

Armament

- Guns: 4 × 7.92 mm (0.312 in) MG 15 machine guns, (later upgraded to 6)
- Bombs: 1,000 kg (2,200 lb) bombs carried internally

== See also ==
Related development

- Dornier Do 17
- Dornier Do 217

Aircraft of comparable role, configuration, and era

- Bristol Blenheim
- PZL.37 Łoś
- Tupolev SB

Related lists

- List of bomber aircraft
- List of military aircraft of Germany

== Bibliography ==
- Dressel, Joachim; Griehl, Manfred (1994). Bombers of the Luftwaffe. London: Arms and Armour. ISBN 1-85409-140-9.
- Griehl, Manfred (2005) [1991]. Dornier Do 17 E-Z, Do 215 B: The Flying Pencil in Luftwaffe Service. Erlangen, Germany: AirDOC. ISBN 3-935687-42-7.
- Kulikov, Victor (March 2000). "Des occasions en or pour Staline, ou les avions allemands en URSS" [Golden Opportunities for Stalin, or German Aircraft in the USSR]. Avions: Toute l'Aéronautique et son histoire (in French) (84): 16–23. ISSN 1243-8650.
- Kulikov, Victor (April 2000). "Des occasions en or pour Staline, ou les avions allemands en URSS". Avions: Toute l'Aéronautique et son histoire (in French) (85): 44–49. ISSN 1243-8650.
- Munson, Kenneth (1960). Enemy Aircraft (German and Italian) of World War II. London, UK: Ian Allan Ltd.
- Olrog, Mikael (2017). Dornier Do 215: From Reconnaissance Aircraft to Nightfighter. Manchester, UK: Crecy Publishing. ISBN 978-1-90653-752-4.
- Green, William (1967). Warplanes of the Second World War, Volume Nine, Bombers and Reconnaissance Aircraft. London: Macdonald. ISBN 978-0-356-01491-3.
