= Jagdgeschwader 131 =

Fighter Wing 131
- Jagdgeschwader 131
- Active: 1937–1938; 1938–1939
- Country: Nazi Germany
- Branch: Luftwaffe
- Garrison/HQ: Döberitz; Jesau

Jagdgeschwader 131 was a fighter wing of Nazi Germany's Luftwaffe during the interwar period. It was formed in early 1937 without a wing staff and only a single group, I./JG 131 from a cadre provided by II./JG 132. I./JG 131 was redesignated as I./JG 130 on 1 November 1938.

== Bibliography ==
- Mombeek, Eric; Smith, J. Richard & Creek, Eddie J. (1999). Jagdwaffe: Birth of the Luftwaffe Fighter Force. Luftwaffe Colours. Vol. 1, Section 1. Classic Publications. ISBN 0-9526867-5-9.
- Tessin, Georg (1974). Deutsche Verbände und Truppen 1918-1939: Altes Heer, Freiwilligenverbände, Reichswehr, Heer, Lutfwaffe, Landespolizei. Biblio-Verlag. ISBN 3-7648-1000-9.
