= Kampfgeschwader 77 =

- Active: 1939–44
- Country: Nazi Germany
- Branch: Luftwaffe
- Type: Bomber Wing
- Role: Air interdiction close air support Offensive counter air Maritime interdiction Strategic bombing
- Size: Air Force Wing
- Engagements: Polish Campaign; Battle of the Netherlands; Battle of Belgium; Battle of France; Battle of Britain; Battle of the Atlantic; Eastern Front; Battle of Normandy

Insignia
- Identification symbol: 3Z

Kampfgeschwader 77 (KG 77) was a Luftwaffe bomber wing during World War II. Its units participated on all of the major fronts in the European Theatre until its dissolution in 1944. It operated all three of the major German bomber types; the Dornier Do 17, Heinkel He 111 and the Junkers Ju 88.

== History ==
Kampfgeschwader 77 was formed on 1 May 1939 at Praha-Kbely, Kampfgeschwader 77 in Czechoslovakia with Stab./KG 77 and I Gruppe. II Gruppe at Praha-Kbely on the same date. The unit was allocated to Luftflotte 4, and equipped with the Do 17Z, while III./KG 77 was not made operational until 26 August 1939, again in Königgrätz, now Hradec Králové. While training in the summer of 1939 the Geschwader "worked up" on the Dornier Do 17Z and He 111.

== Wartime service ==
=== Polish Campaign ===
During the Polish campaign I. and III. Gruppes of KG 77 took part in combat operations. Operating from Breslau-Schöngarten (today Wrocław Airport), I./KG 77 committed 108 bombers to the campaign. Operating from Breslau under Luftflotte 4. The unit participated in the Battle of Bzura, and carried out raids in the areas of Galicia, Radom, Kielce and Warsaw against rail, airfield and troop targets.

=== Denmark and Norway ===
The unit did not participate in Operation Weserübung but instead spent the spring training and resting in preparation for the decisive western offensive in 1940.

=== France and the Low Countries ===
The Unit committed 111 bombers to the campaign. From its base at Werl it operated over Belgium and northern France, attacking French armour targets in the Reims and Amiens area. KG 77 supported the German Army during the Battle of Dunkirk, and it supported the southern offensive, Fall Rot until the French surrender. The unit took part in Operation Paula, an attack on Paris airfields, 3 June 1940.

=== Over Britain and the Battle of the Atlantic 1940–41 ===
In mid-July 1940 all three gruppen returned to Germany to convert to the Junkers Ju 88. When III./KG 77 returned to France in late August (it was still based at Regensburg on 26 August) it had 35 Ju 88s operational. This gruppe suffered losses of 9 Ju 88s on a single mission against Gravesend on 18 September, one of the highest losses of any gruppe in a single mission. I./KG 77 in conjunction with II. and III. gruppe supported operations during the Blitz. On 27 September I./KG 77 lost six J 88s when raiding London, while II./KG 77 lost another six on the same night.

During 1941 the Geschwader also took part in the Battle of the Atlantic. It attempted to support the German battleship Bismarck during her Atlantic operation during 26–28 May 1941. However, the unit was unable to intervene before she sank. The Geschwader sank the Royal Navy destroyer HMS Mashona on 28 May 1941, as the British forces withdrew to port.

=== Soviet Union ===
I and III./KG 77 were the only units committed to Operation Barbarossa, with a total of 59 Ju 88s. The Geschwader supported Army Group North's drive into the Baltic states and took part in the Siege of Leningrad. During this period I./KG 77 helped defeat a strong Soviet counter-attack by the 11th Army and 34th Army. KG 77 also supported Operation Beowulf, the invasion of the Baltic islands of Osel, Moon and Dago.

During the battle for Estonia it inflicted severe losses on Soviet shipping, with the same dive-bombing tactics used over Norway, France and Britain. KGr 806 sank the Soviet destroyer Karl Marx on 8 August 1941 in Loksa Bay, Tallinn. On 28 August the Ju 88s had more success when KG 77 and KGr 806 sank the 2,026 grt steamer Vironia, the 2,317 grt Lucerne, the 1,423 Atis Kronvalds and the ice breaker Krišjānis Valdemārs (2,250 grt). The rest of the Soviet "fleet", were forced to change course. This took them through a heavily mined area. As a result, 21 Soviet warships, including five destroyers, struck mines and sank. On 29 August, the Ju 88s accounted for the transport ships Vtoraya Pyatiletka (3,974 grt), Kalpaks (2,190 grt) and Leningradsovet (1,270 grt) sunk. Furthermore, the ships Ivan Papanin, Saule, Kazakhstan and the Serp i Molot were damaged. Some 5,000 Soviet soldiers were lost. KG 77 was largely withdrawn from the Soviet Union, although I./KG 77 continued to operate on the Eastern Front until July 1942, supporting German forces during Operation Seydlitz and the Second Battle of Kharkov.

=== Mediterranean and North Africa ===
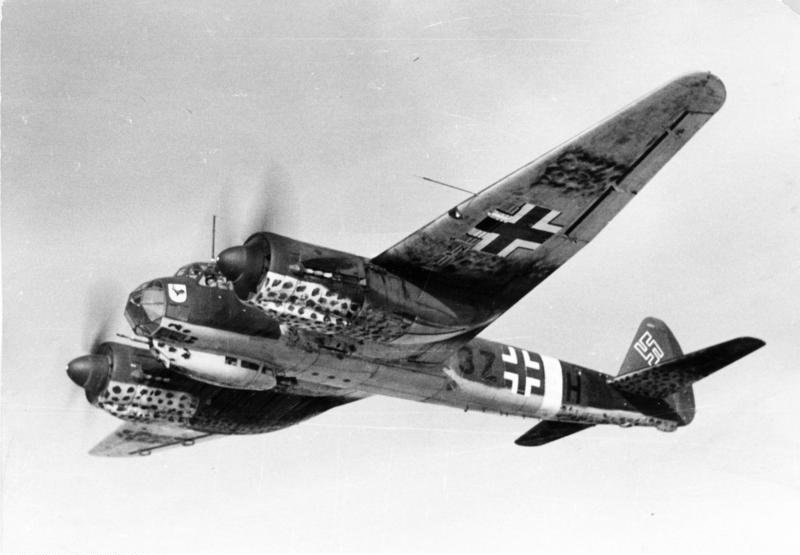
Junkers Ju 88 (Kennung 3Z+H) of Kampfgeschwader 77 (I./KG 77) over Italy/North Africa

I./KG 77 was reformed as I./KG 6 on 31 August 1942, after the unit ceased operations over Great Britain. However I./KG 77 was reformed again on 10 September 1942. The Kampfgeschwader carried out operations in the Mediterranean and North Africa until June 1943, taking part in the Siege of Malta and the Second Battle of El Alamein. The unit also resisted the Allied invasion of Sicily, probably destroying the U.S. Liberty ship SS Robert Rowan on 11 July. KG 77 made constant night attacks against Allied Naval forces from 10 July - 25 August 1943. After retraining naval attack methods, the unit could now operate with effective torpedo methods. I./KG 77 operated from Salon in southern France from March - July 1944, attacking American convoys off the coast of Algeria.

=== Western Front 1943–44 ===
KG 77's primary responsibility was anti-shipping in the English Channel. Committed under the command of Luftflotte 3, KG 77 supported the German Army, operating at night to avoid Allied air superiority forces, until 1 September 1944, when it was no longer mentioned on Luftflotte 3's order of battle.

== Commanding officers ==
- Oberst Heinrich Seywald 1 May 1939 - 13 September 1939 (possibly acting CO)
- Oberst Wolff von Stutterheim 14 September 1939 - 20 March 1940
- Oberst Johan-Volkmar Fisser 21 March 1940 - 31 May 1940 (possibly acting CO)
- Major-General Wolff von Stutterheim (promoted) 31 May 1940 - 15 June 1940 (Wounded in action, died 3 December 1940)
- Major-General Heinz-Hellmuth von Wühlisch 21 June 1940 - 1 August 1940
- Oberstleutnant Johann Raithel 1 August 1940 - 13 March 1942
- Major Arved Crüger 13 March 1942 - 22 March 1942
- Major Wilhelm Stremmler 12/15 February 1943 - 20 July 1944
