= Unín =

Unín may refer to places:

- Unín (Brno-Country District), a municipality and village in the Czech Republic
- Unín, Skalica District, a municipality and village in Slovakia

== See also ==
- Unin (disambiguation)
