= Amerika Programme =

WWI armaments policy

The Amerika Programme was the name given to the armaments policy of the Imperial German Air Service during World War I, which was started in June 1917. Its purpose was to increase the German air combat capability and end the air superiority of the Entente. The name was selected in analogy to the 1916 Hindenburg Programme of military-industrial policy.

When the United States entered the war against Germany on April 4, 1917, German armaments planning to the end of September 1917 had already been completed and arranged. Although the United States was known to have only 55 military aircraft at that time and its aircraft industry was insignificant, the German military leadership held in high regard the efficiency, motivation and determination of the political leadership to mobilize the US industry.

The Amerika programme was developed as a response to the expected arrival of US aviators in Europe. It provided for an increase in German aircraft production and an increase in pilot training. At the time the German Empire had forty fighter squadrons (Jagdstaffel). A fighter squadron consisted of eight to nine fighter planes. The aim of the programme was to double the number of fighter squadrons. Despite higher production numbers, many fighter squadrons never reached their full strength. Furthermore, the Allies did not lose their air supremacy. This was due to the fact that the Albatros D.V and Pfalz D.III fighters were technically inferior to the airplanes of the Entente.

At the beginning of June 1917, the Oberste Heeresleitung (OHL; Supreme Army Command) approved the memorandum by Ernst von Hoeppner, the commanding general of the Air Force (Kogenluft), which demanded the following programme:

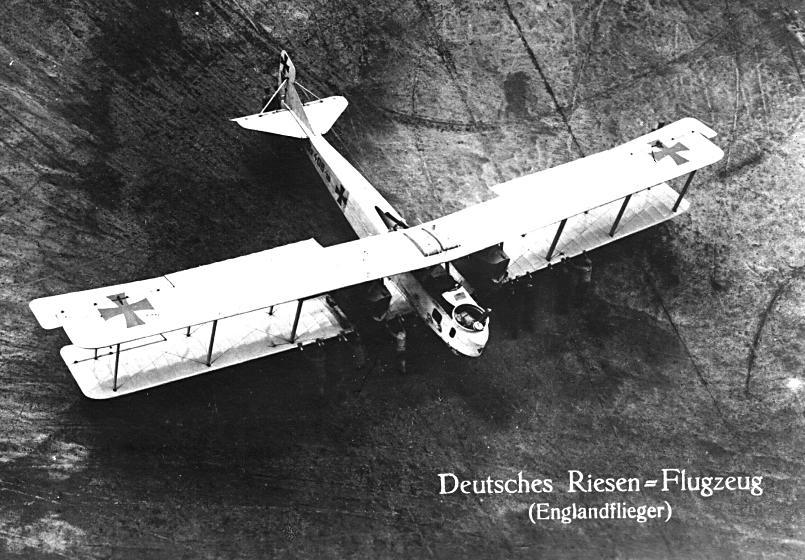
A German bomber

1. Creation of 40 new fighter squadrons (JaSta No. 41–80) and staff of Jagdgeschwader 1
2. Reorganization of the flier detachments (A) 184–200 (attached to the armies for artillery spotting)
3. Expansion of 13 pilot schools and both artillery pilot schools
4. Creation of a second fighter pilot school
5. Creation of a replacement department (to train personnel replacements)
6. Transfer of 28,643 men to the air service
7. Monthly production increased to 2,000 aircraft and 2,500 aircraft engines from March 1, 1918
8. Allocation of 1,500 machine guns per month to the air service from October 1, 1917
9. Monthly Provision of the required 12,000 tons of gasoline and 1,200 tons of oil from January 1, 1918
10. The number of workers in the aircraft and aero engine industries increased by 7,000.
11. Creation of Jagdstaffel 81 from the Eastern Front units
12. Establishment of five staffs for fighting group leaders
13. Establishment of commands for the Riesenflugzeug detachments
14. Dispatch of the flier detachment 305 to Turkey
15. Establishment of the staffs of bomber wings (Bombengeschwader) No. 5, 6 and 7
16. Establishment of a "Sedan Air Training Unit" to teach general staff courses

Points 11 to 16 were only added to the program later, when the Amerika programme was already running. The number of new flier detachments (A) was later reduced from 17 to 6. In exchange, they would now receive nine aircraft instead of the previous six and another 28 flier detachments (A) were also to be brought up to nine aircraft each.

In connection with the Amerika programme, plans were also made for the further development of aircraft. Despite the material shortages the German Empire was experiencing at that time, the Amerika programme was implemented with some success after delays. Total aircraft numbers more than doubled from 1,200 in 1917 to 2,600 by March 1918.

== Bibliography ==
- Günter Kroschel, Helmut Stützer: Die deutschen Militärflugzeuge. 1910–1918. Mittler, Herford 1994, ISBN 3-89350-693-4.
