= Unin =

Unin may refer to:

- United Nations Institute for Namibia, an educational system set up in Zambia by the United Nations
- Unín (Brno-Country District), Czech Republic
- Unín, Skalica District, Slovakia
- Unin, Masovian Voivodeship (east-central Poland)
- Unin, West Pomeranian Voivodeship (north-west Poland)
