= Ernst von Hoeppner =

Prussian cavalry officer (1860-1922)

Ernst Wilhelm von Hoeppner
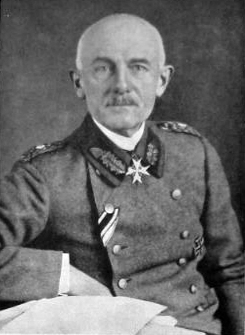
- Born: 14 January 1860; Tonnin, Wollin, Pomerania
- Died: 26 September 1922 (aged 62); Groß-Mokratz, Wollin, Pomerania
- Burial place: Tonnin, Wollin, Pomerania
- Military career
- Allegiance: German Empire
- Service years: 1879 – 1919
- Rank: General der Kavallerie (General of Cavalry)
- Commands: 75th Reserve Division; Luftstreitkräfte; XVIII Corps
- Conflicts: World War I: Aviation in World War I
- Awards: Pour le Mérite
- Other work: Military historian

Ernst Wilhelm Arnold von Hoeppner (14 January 1860 – 26 September 1922) was a Prussian cavalry officer who served as the Commanding General of the German Air Service (Luftstreitkräfte) during World War I.

== Early life and military career ==
Hoeppner was born in Tonnin on the island of Wollin in Pomerania on 14 January 1860. He was the third son of a Prussian major Ernst Ferdinand Hoeppner (1813-1881) and his wife Wilhelmine Minna, née Kropf (1827-1896). Ernst Hoeppner attended the Cadet School in Potsdam from 1872 and in 1879 he was commissioned as a second lieutenant in the 6th Magdeburg Dragoon Regiment. He attended the Prussian Military Academy in 1890. From 1893 to 1899, he was a member of the 14th Dragoon Regiment stationed at Colmar in Alsace, commanding a squadron.

Hoeppner married Sophie Eugenie Minette Elisabeth Adele Valentine of Pöppinghausen on 14 July 1885. They had three children: Busso, Margot and Gerd.

In 1902 Hoeppner was appointed to the General Staff. He was appointed as a staff officer with the IX Army Corps in Altona in 1904. By 1906 he was a lieutenant colonel and was commander of the 13th Hussars Regiment in Diedenhofen. Two years later he was appointed chief of staff of the VII Army Corps. In September 1912 he was made commander of the 4th Cavalry Brigade in Bromberg and the following year he was raised to the nobility by Kaiser Wilhelm II and granted the nobiliary particle von before his surname. This was in recognition of his achievements as a staff officer and brigade commander.

== World War I ==
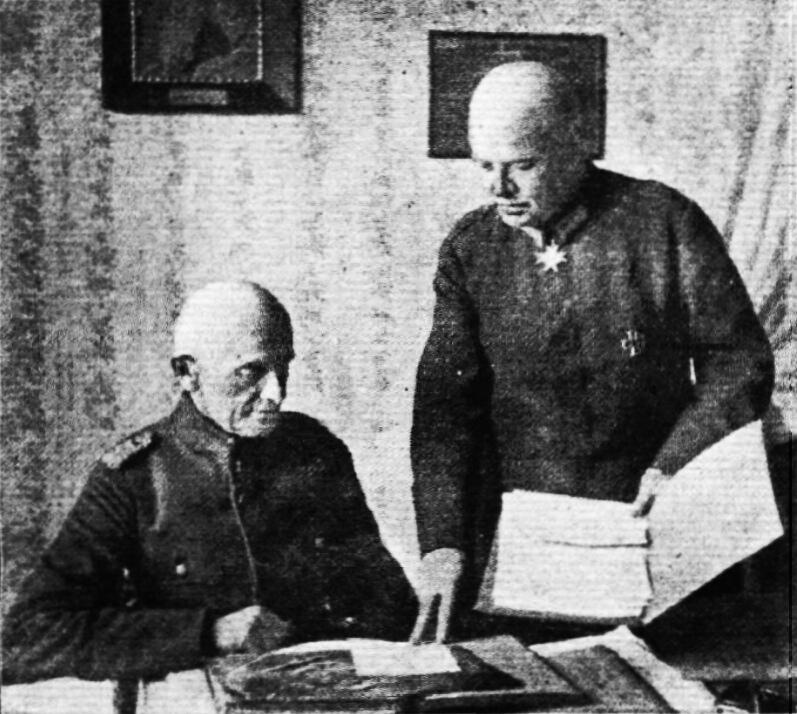
Hoeppner in consultation with his Chief of Staff, Oberstleutnant Thomsen

At the start of World War I Hoeppner was Chief of Staff at the 3rd Army headquarters. He remained in this post until spring of 1915 when he took up command of the 14th Reserve Division. Later in 1915 he was appointed Chief of Staff of the 2nd Army and in 1916 he became the commander of the 75th Reserve Division.

In October 1916, General Ludendorff decided that the German Air Service needed greater unity of command with a general officer having authority over all the Army's aerial combat and anti-aircraft units both in the field and at home. Ludendorff chose Hoeppner as the new air commander and it was at this time the Air Service was renamed from Fliegertruppe to Luftstreitkräfte. Hoeppner was given the title of Kommandierender General der Luftstreitkräfte (Commanding General of the Air Service - sometimes abbreviated to Kogenluft in German), holding the rank of lieutenant-general. He was directly responsible to Hindenburg at Supreme Army Command.

Hoeppner reorganized the fragmented air services, greatly increasing the number of Jastas (squadrons) and forming them into Jagdgeschwader (wings). Priority was given to the development of strategies for massed air attacks. In 1917 Hoeppner authored a memorandum asking for a significant increase in aircraft production which initiated the Amerika Programme. In 1917 he was awarded the Pour le Mérite even though as a senior commander he was not directly involved in air combat. The award was resented by some of his junior officers.

== Post war ==
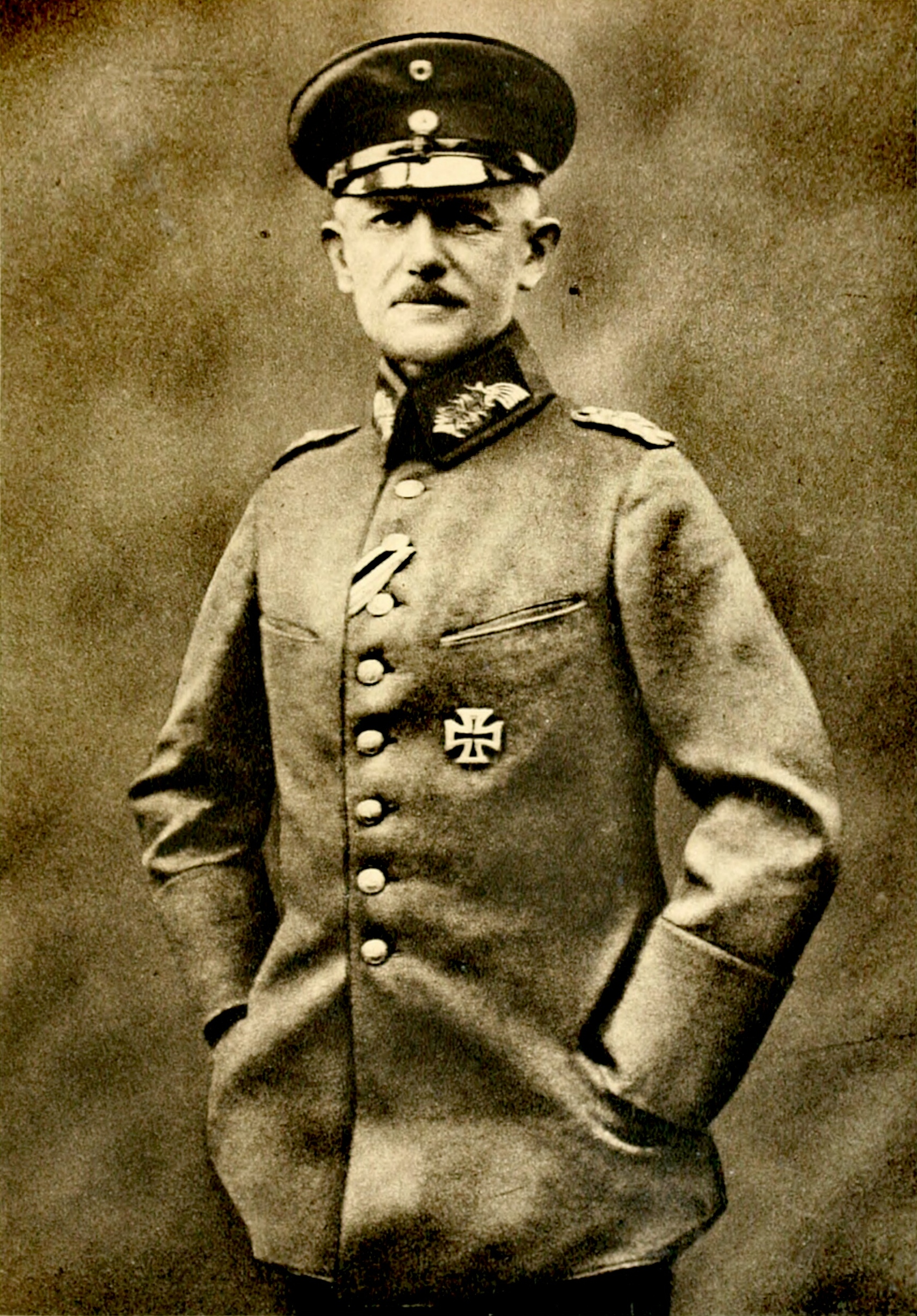
Hoeppner pictured at the end of World War I

After the war, the German Air Service was dissolved. The German War Ministry issued orders for Von Hoepppner's post to be disestablished on 16 January 1919 although he appears to have continued as Commanding General for a few more days. His final order to his Air Service personnel was issued on 21 January. He then took up command of the 18th Army Corps on 10 April 1919 but resigned from active service at his own request at the end of November 1919. He retired as general of cavalry with permission to wear the uniform of the 13th Hussars Regiment.

Hoeppner returned to his estate at Groß-Mokratz (now Mokrzyca Wielka) on the island of Wollin in the Baltic Sea where he wrote his memoirs. In 1921 he published Deutschlands Krieg in der Luft ("Germany's War in the Air"), a study of the German Air Service from 1914 to 1918.

On 26 September 1922 Hoeppner died of influenza at the age of 62. He was buried in his birthplace of Tonnin, on the island of Wollin, in what is now Poland.

== In popular culture ==
In the 2008 biopic The Red Baron, Hoeppner is portrayed by actor Axel Prahl.

Military offices
Preceded by Max von Seydewitz	Commander of the 75th Reserve Division; 1916	Succeeded by Arthur von Eisenhart-Rothe
Preceded by Hermann Thomsen; As Chief of Field Air Forces; Chef des Feldflugwesens	Commanding General of the Imperial German Army Air Service; Kommandierender General der Luftstreitkräfte; 1916–1919	Air Service disestablished
Preceded by Günther von Etzel	Commander of the XVIII Army Corps; 1919	Corps disestablished
