= Luftstreitkräfte =

Air arm of the Imperial German Army

Imperial German Air Service
- Deutsche Luftstreitkräfte
- Form of the Tatzenkreuz used on German military aircraft in 1915
- Founded: 1 May 1910
- Disbanded: 8 May 1920
- Country: German Empire (1910–1918); Weimar Republic (1918–1920)
- Allegiance: Kaiser Wilhelm II
- Branch: Imperial German Army
- Type: Air force
- Role: Aerial warfare
- Size: 1918: 2,709 front line aircraft 56 airships 186 balloon detachments About 4,500 aircrew
- Engagements: World War I: Aviation in World War I; Greater Poland Uprising (1918–1919)

Commanders
- Notable commanders: Hermann von der Lieth-Thomsen; Ernst von Hoeppner

Insignia
- 1914–1915

- 1916 – March 1918

- March/April 1918 – 1919

The Deutsche Luftstreitkräfte (German: [ˈdɔʏtʃə ˈlʊftˌʃtʁaɪtkʁɛftə], German Air Combat Forces) – known before October 1916 as Die Fliegertruppen des deutschen Kaiserreiches (lit. "The flying troops of the German Imperial Reich") – was the air arm of the Imperial German Army. In English-language sources it is usually referred to as the Imperial German Air Service, although that is not a literal translation of either name. German naval aviators of the Marine-Fliegerabteilung were an integral part of the Imperial German Navy (Kaiserliche Marine). Both military branches operated aeroplanes, observation balloons and airships.

== Founding ==
The Imperial German Army created an experimental balloon company inspired by the American balloon corps they had seen while observing the American Civil War, with varying forms of organisation from 1884 to 1901 until a Balloon Battalion was finally formed. The rapid development of aeronautics led to trials of airships and the choice of rigid types built by Zeppelin and Schutte-Lanz. The first military aircraft to be acquired by the German Army entered service in 1910 and the first five aviation battalions were established on 1 October 1913. The Imperial German Air Service (Die Fliegertruppen des deutschen Kaiserreiches) and other branches concerned with air matters such as anti-aircraft, home defence and air intelligence were unified in the Luftstreitkräfte on 8 October 1916.

The duties of such aircraft were initially intended to be reconnaissance and artillery spotting in support of the armies, just as balloons had been used during the Franco-Prussian War (1870–1871) and as far back as the Battle of Fleurus (1794) during the French Revolutionary Wars. The French Aviation Militaire (army air service) was created in 1909 and became the Aéronautique Militaire in 1912. The Air Battalion of the Royal Engineers, with two companies, was established in November 1911. The Royal Flying Corps (RFC), with a military wing and a naval wing, was formed in February 1912.

== Organization ==
The initial units of the Luftstreitkräfte, dedicated to observation, were known as Feldflieger Abteilungen (Field Flier Detachments) and had an official establishment of six unarmed, two-seat "A" (monoplane), and/or "B"-class (biplane) aircraft apiece. Each "FFA" unit was assigned to an army unit in their local area and usually numbered with the same number as the army they were assigned to serve. The Luftstreitkräfte organization changed substantially as the war progressed, to accommodate new types of aircraft, doctrine, tactics and the needs of the ground troops, in particular the artillery. During this time the system of organisation and unit designations evolved that would form the basis of those used in the Luftwaffe of Nazi Germany, when it was revealed in 1935. During 1916, the German High Command (Oberste Heeresleitung, OHL) reorganised Die Fliegertruppen by creating specialist fighter, bomber and reconnaissance units such as single-seat fighter squadrons (Jagdstaffeln, Jastas, hunting squadrons) to counter the Royal Flying Corps and the French Aviation Militaire.

=== Commanders ===
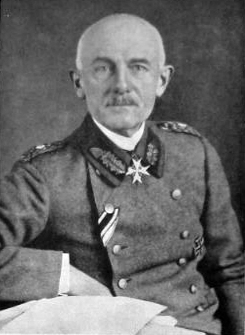
Ernst von Hoeppner

The Luftstreitkräfte had a single commander during its existence, the Kommandierender General der Luftstreitkräfte, General der Kavallerie Ernst von Hoeppner who held the position from 8 October 1916 to 21 January 1919, a period of 2 years, 3 months.

== Fighter unit organization ==
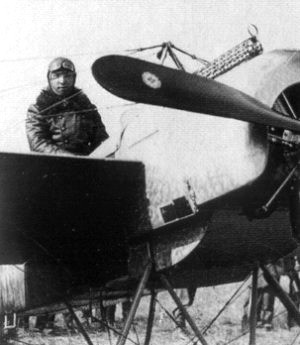
Leutnant Max Immelmann with his first Fokker Eindecker, E.13/15

The initial deployment of fighter aircraft in the summer of 1915 occurred within the Feldflieger Abteilung, which were being equipped with one or two of the new Fokker Eindecker fighter aircraft for each unit, starting with the five Fokker M.5K/MG production prototypes of the Eindecker, bearing serial numbers E.1/15 through E.5/15. The buildup of the Eindecker fighter force rapidly progressed with regular lMG 08 "Spandau"-armed production examples of the Fokker E.I following the deliveries of the M.5K/MG airframes late in the summer of 1915, with early E.Is going to aces like Max Immelmann, who received IdFlieg serial number E.13/15 in August 1915.

The first step towards specialist fighter-only aviation units within the German military was the establishment of Kampfeinsitzer Kommando ("single-seat battle unit", abbreviated as KEK) formations by Inspektor-Major Friedrich Stempel in February 1916. These were based around Eindeckers and other new fighter designs emerging, like the Pfalz E-series monoplanes (copies of a French design), that were being detached from their former FFA units during the winter of 1915–1916 and brought together in pairs and quartets at particularly strategic locations, as KEK units were formed at Vaux, Avillers, Jametz, Cunel and other strategic locations along the Western Front, to act as Luftwachtdienst (aerial guard force) units, consisting only of fighters.

Following the era of the KEK units through the summer of 1916, Jagdstaffeln (hunting squadrons), established by the reorganization that started in the late summer of 1916 were fielded by four kingdoms of the German Empire. Individually – each of these units was often known by the abbreviation "Jasta". The Kingdom of Prussia was predominant, with a fighter force eventually comprising 67 squadrons. The Kingdom of Bavaria formed ten of these units, the Kingdom of Saxony formed seven and the Kingdom of Württemberg four.

On 24 June 1917, the Luftstreitkräfte brought a quartet of Jasta squadrons together to form its first fighter wing, Royal Prussian Jagdgeschwader I, incorporating Jastas 4, 6, 10 and 11, and set the pattern for using Roman numerals in the Luftstreitkräfte in the titles of such larger units. Manfred von Richthofen was moved up from command of Jasta 11 to command JG I. Much as Jasta 2 had been renamed as Jasta Boelcke in December 1916 after Oswald Boelcke, Germany's top fighter tactician, had been lost in a mid-air collision in October 1916 following the "Red Baron's" death in action in late April 1918, JG I was renamed to honor von Richthofen by order of the Kaiser.

The Prussians established three more Jagdgeschwader. On 2 February 1918, JG II formed from Jastas 12, 13, 15 and 19, with Adolf Ritter von Tutschek in command. On the same day, JG III consolidated Jasta 2 Boelcke and Jastas 26, 27 and 36 under Bruno Loerzer. Finally, on 2 September 1918, the Royal Prussian Marine Jagdgeschwader was formed from the Kaiserliche Marine's Marine Feld Jastas I through V and placed in charge of Gotthard Sachsenberg. Bavaria established the Royal Bavarian Jagdgeschwader IV on 3 October 1918, from Jastas 23, 32, 34 and 35 under Eduard Ritter von Schleich.

== Unit designations ==
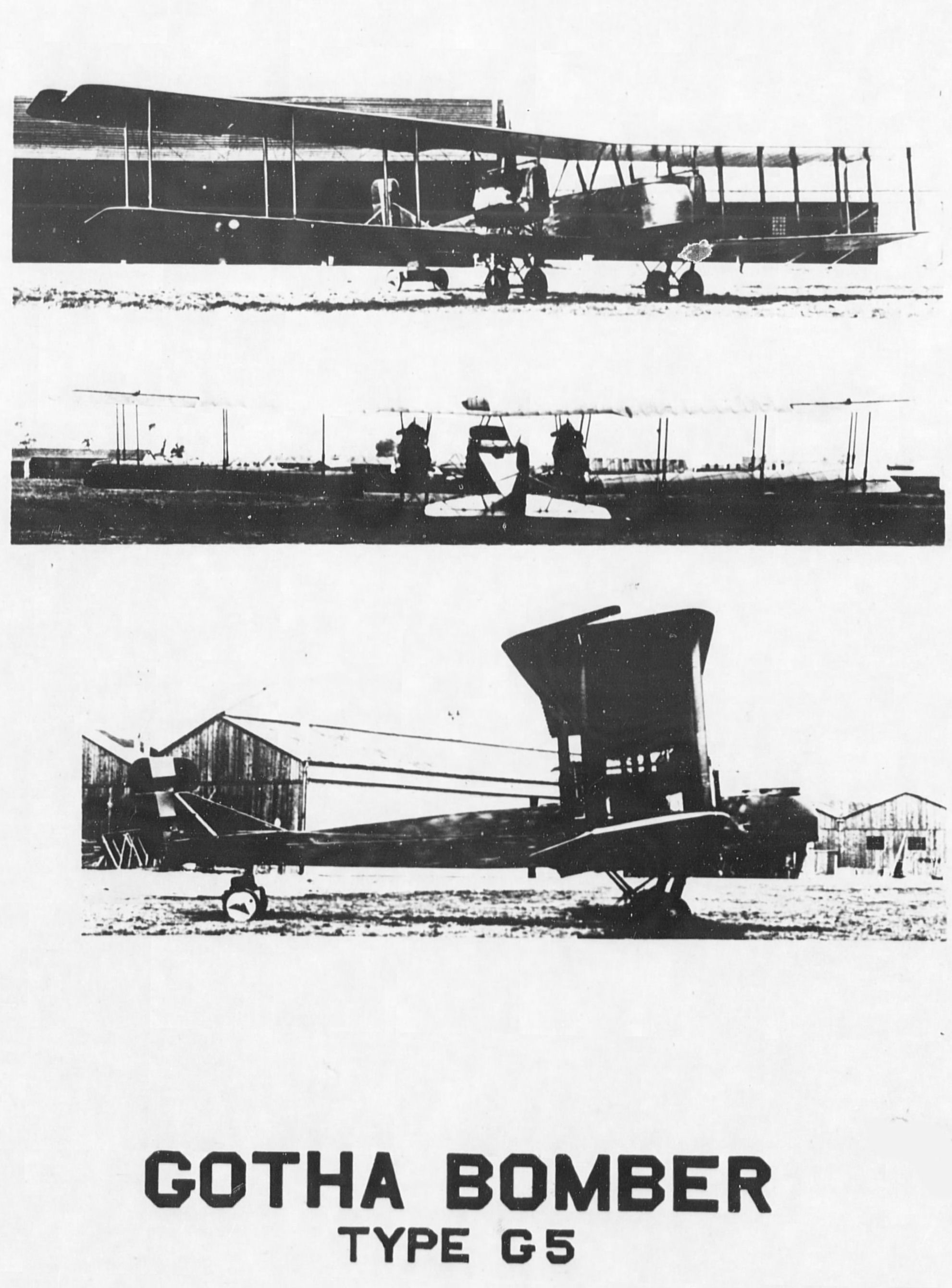
Gotha G.V

- Artillerieflieger-Abteilung (AFA) Artillery Flier Detachment
- Artillerieflieger-Schule (AFS) Artillery Flier School
- Armee-Flug-Park (AFP): "army flight park"
- Ballonzug: (BZ) Balloon Platoon
- Bombengeschwader: (BG) Bomber Wing
- Bombengeschwader der Oberste Heeresleitung: (Bogohl ) the Bomber Wings under direct control by the German Army's High Command in World War I.
- Bomberstaffel: (Bosta) - bomber squadron
- etc – Etappe: Post
- Feldflieger Abteilung (FFA) - "field flier detachment", the initial flight formations of the German Army in 1914–15
- Feldluftschiffer-Abteilung (FLA) Field Airship Detachment
- Festungsflieger-Abteilung (FestFA) Fortress Flier Detachment
- Flieger-Abteilung (FA) Flier Detachment
- Flieger-Abteilung (Artillerie) FA(A) : Flier Detachment (Artillery)
- Flieger-Bataillon (FlgBtl): Flier Battalion
- Fliegerbeobachter-Schule (FBS): Aerial Observer School
- Fliegerersatz-Abteilung (FEA): Replacement Detachment
- Fliegerschule (FS): Flight School
- Jagdgeschwader (JG): "hunting wing", i.e., fighter wing
- Jagdstaffel: ('Jasta') "hunting squadron", i.e., Fighter Squadron
- Jagdstaffel-Schule (JastaSch): Fighter Squadron School (also referred to as Jastaschule)
- Kampfeinsitzerkommando (KEK): Combat Single-Seater Command, a predecessor to Jasta units
- Kampfeinsitzerstaffel (Kest): Combat Single-Seater squadron, a predecessor to Jasta units
- Kampfgeschwader: (KG) - Tactical Bomber Wing
- Kampfgeschwader der Oberste Heeresleitung (Kagohl): the tactical bomber wings under direct control of the German Army High Command in World War I.
- Kampfstaffel (Kasta): -Tactical Bomber Squadron
- Luftschiff-Truppe (Luft): Airship Force
- Luftschiffer-Bataillon (LsBtl): Airship battalion
- Reihenbildzug (RBZ): Aerial Photography platoon
- Riesenflugzeug-Abteilung (Rfa): "giant aircraft detachment"
- Schlachtstaffel (Schlasta): battle squadron
- Schutzstaffel (Schusta): protection squadron

== Aircraft ==
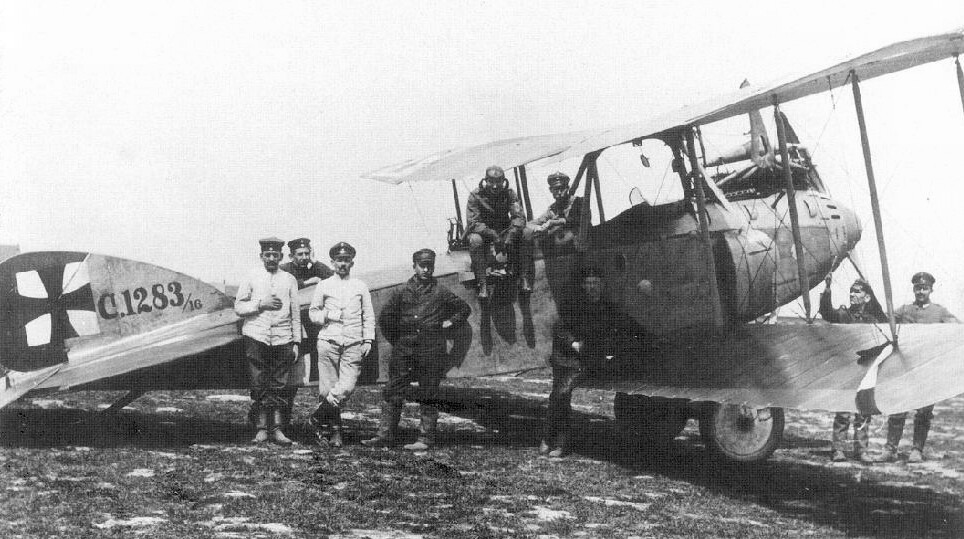
Allbatros C.VII# C.1283/16

During the war, the Imperial Army Air Service used many types of aircraft, ranging from fighters (such as those manufactured by Albatros-Flugzeugwerke, Fokker, Pfalz Flugzeugwerke and Siemens-Schuckert), reconnaissance aircraft (Aviatik, Deutsche Flugzeug-Werke (DFW) and Rumpler), two-seat fighters from Halberstädter Flugzeugwerke and Hannoversche Waggonfabrik and heavy bombers, largely the twin-engined designs from the Gothaer Waggonfabrik (Gotha) and the enormous, multi-engined heavy bombers produced by Zeppelin-Staaken and rigid airships from Luftschiffbau Zeppelin (the Zeppelin Company) and Schütte-Lanz as well as various types of airship from other firms.

== Aircraft designation system ==
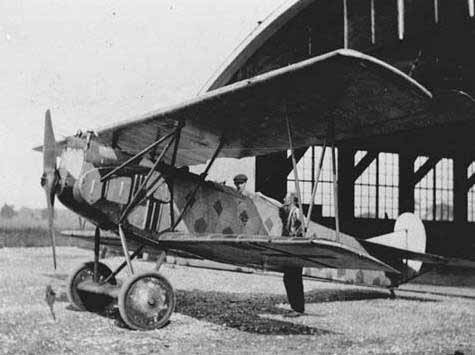
Fokker D.VII used by the Luftstreitkräfte

During the First World War, German aircraft officially adopted for military service were allocated a designation that included (1) the name of the manufacturer, (2) a function or "class" letter, and (3) a Roman numeral. The three-part designation was needed for a unique designation to simplify logistics support of the many types of aircraft in operation – especially as Luftstreitkräfte squadrons more often than not were equipped with several different types.

The designation system evolved during the war. Initially, all military aircraft were classed as "A" (monoplanes) or "B" (biplanes). The new "C" class of armed (two seat) biplane began to replace the "B" class aircraft as reconnaissance machines in 1915, the Bs continuing to be built, but as trainers. The "E" class of armed monoplane was also introduced in 1915 – the other classes were added later as new aircraft types were introduced. For most of the war 'D' was only used for biplane fighters, 'E' for monoplane fighters and 'Dr' for triplane fighters, however by the end of the war the 'D' designation was used for all single-seat fighters, including monoplanes (and, in theory at least, triplanes).

A – Unarmed reconnaissance monoplane aircraft (for example the Rumpler Taube and Fokker M.5)
B – Unarmed two-seat biplane, with the observer seated in front of the pilot.
C – Armed two-seat biplane, with the observer (usually) seated to the rear of the pilot.
CL – Light two-seater (primarily from Halberstadt and Hannover), initially intended as escort fighters – by 1917–18, mainly used for ground attack.
D – Doppeldecker – single-seat, armed biplane but later any fighter – for instance the Fokker E.V monoplane was renamed the D.VIII.
Dr – Dreidecker – triplane fighter (twin service test Fokker triplanes initially "F")
E – Eindecker – armed monoplane – initially included monoplane two-seaters. New monoplane types at the end of the war designated as "D" (single seat) or "CL" (two seat).
G – Grossflugzeug – Large twin-engined types, mainly bombers (initially "K") (Note: In 1915, twin-engined aircraft were renamed G types (Grossflugzeug) and used as bombers.)
GL – Lighter, faster twin-engined bombers, intended for use by day.
J – Schlachten – Fuel tanks, pilot, and (usually) the engine protected by armour plate, reducing vulnerability to ground fire. Used for low-level work, especially ground attack.
N – "C" type aircraft adapted for night bombing – apart from night flying equipment they were fitted with wings of greater span to increase bomb load.
R – Riesenflugzeug – "Giant" aircraft – at least three, up to four to six engines – all serviceable in flight.

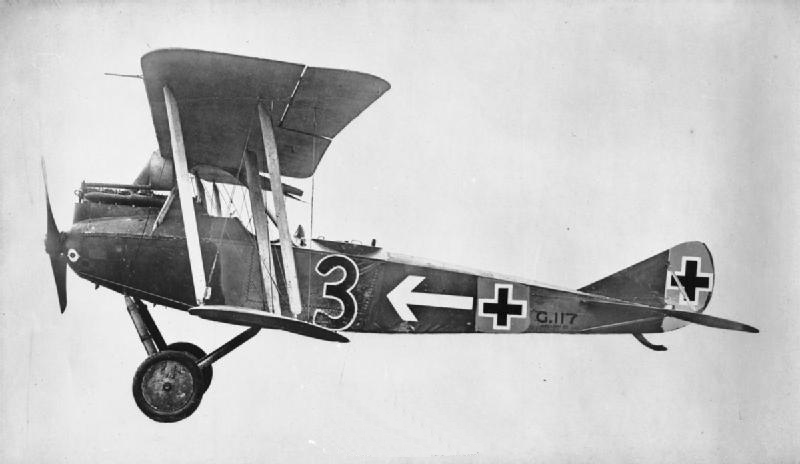
Rumpler C.VII G.117

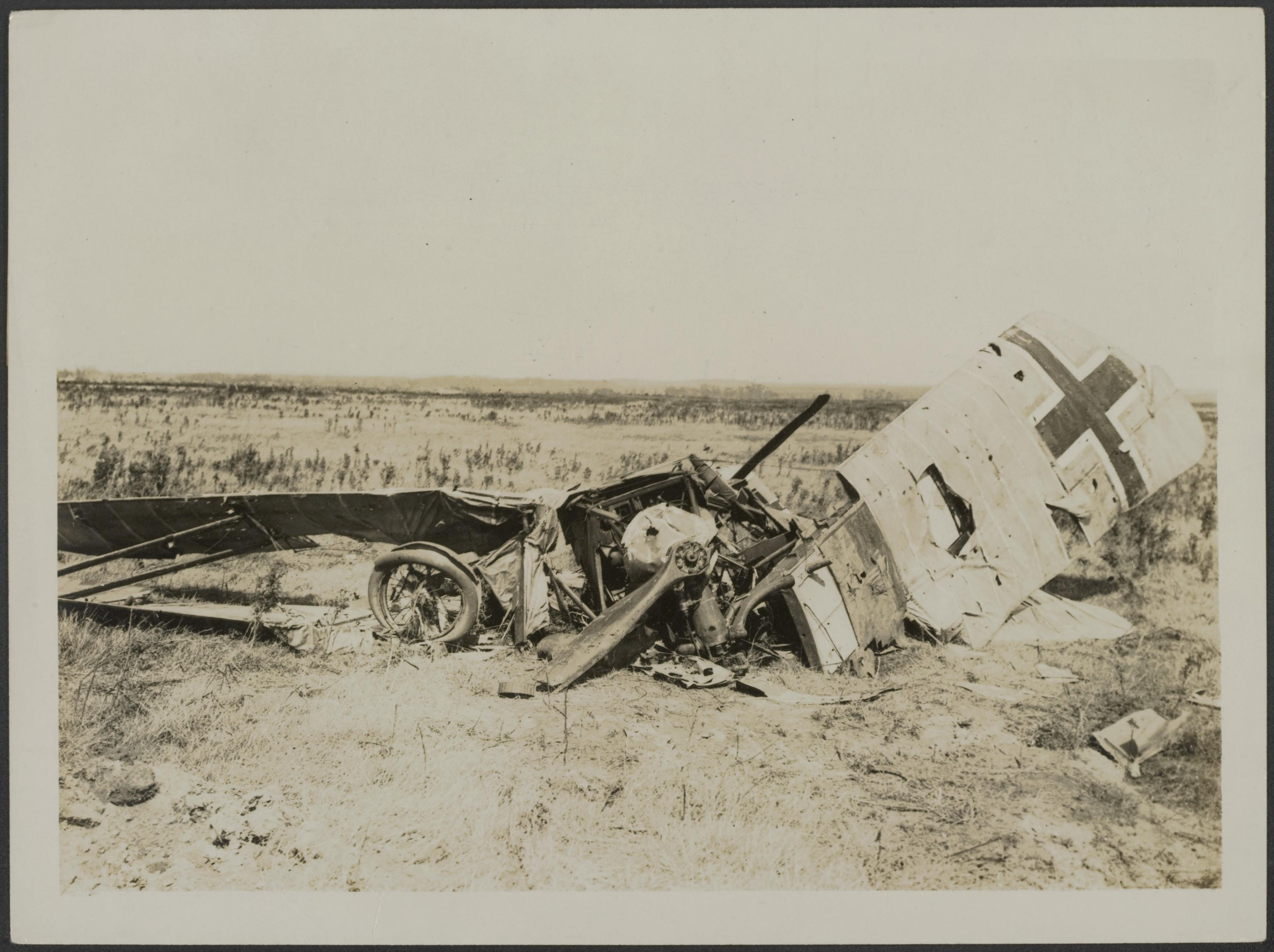
Destroyed German Aircraft on the Western Front-possibly a Rumpler C.IV' the Balkenkreuz shows this is a 1918 aircraft

Most manufacturers also had their own numbering systems quite separate from the official military designations for their products. These sometimes cause confusion – for instance the military "J" series of armored aircraft designs was quite distinct from the Junkers aviation firm's own "J" factory type designations – the factory designation of the (military) Junkers J.I armored, all-metal sesquiplane, for example, was the Junkers J.4. The "M" (for "Militär" or military) and "V" (for "Versuchs" or experimental, according to some sources initially meant a Verspannungslos or "unbraced" airframe) designations of the Fokker firm were also internal. The latter has no direct connection with the official Third Reich-era German "V" designation, also signifying "versuchs", for prototype aircraft, promulgated by the RLM from 1935.

The Kaiserliche Marine's Marine-Fliegerabteilung maritime aviation service used manufacturers' designations rather than the systematic Luftstreitkräfte system described above. For example, the landplane Gotha bombers were numbered in an "LD" (for "land biplane") series by their manufacturer, but in the "G" series in the Luftstreitkräfte – while the Gotha seaplanes used by the navy were (and continue to be) known by their manufacturer's "WD" (for Wasserflugzeug-Doppeldecker, or "seaplane biplane") designation. Similarly, the sizable number of German seaplane designs from Flugzeugbau Friedrichshafen, were all known in naval service by their "FF" factory designations.

Army and navy airships were individually numbered, in the same way as contemporary German destroyers and submarines, and were outside any system of "type" designation.

== Pilots ==
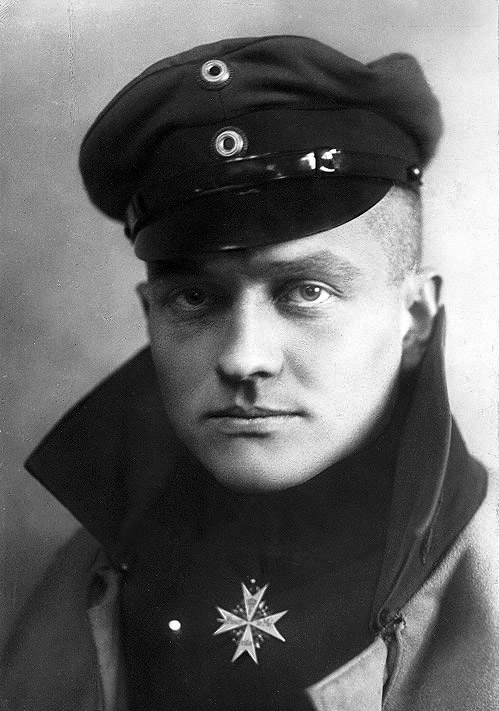
Manfred von Richthofen, known as The Red Baron

Fighter pilots received the most attention in the annals of military aviation, since it produced high-scoring "aces" such as Manfred von Richthofen, known in German as der Rote Kampfflieger (the Red Air Fighter) and in English as The Red Baron. With 80 confirmed kills he is considered the most successful fighter pilot of the war. The first "confirmed" German aerial fighter victory of the war credited to a synchronized-gun-equipped aircraft went to Leutnant Kurt Wintgens on 15 July 1915, after downing a Morane-Saulnier L parasol monoplane. He had previously downed two similar aircraft on 1 and 4 July, but remained unconfirmed. This fortnight of unprecedented German aerial victories initiated the period of the Fokker Scourge. Other notable German pilots from the Fokker Scourge onwards included Ernst Udet, Erich Löwenhardt, Werner Voss, Josef Jacobs, Wilhelm Frankl, Max Immelmann and the master aerial tactician Oswald Boelcke (the latter pair were the first to be awarded the Pour le Mérite, the highest decoration for gallantry for officers in the German Empire: simultaneously, on 12 January 1916, after shooting down eight Allied aeroplanes each). The award to Immelmann may have caused the decoration to acquire its popular nickname, the "Blue Max". With more and more pilots reaching this mark, the required air victories were steadily increased to about 30 in 1918. In total 76 airmen were awarded the Pour le Mérite. 69 airmen received the "Goldenes Militär-Verdienst-Kreuz" (Military Merit Cross), the highest Prussian bravery award for non-commissioned officers and enlisted men. Among them was Gottfried Ehmann, the highest scoring air gunner of the war (12 victories). About 391 German pilots are credited with shooting down at least five Allied aircraft each.

== Insignia ==
The basic Balkenkreuz national insignia, adopted by German aviation units in early April 1918

German and Austro-Hungarian military aircraft at first used the cross pattée insignia, most often known in German as the Eisernes Kreuz, for the Prussian military medal. The Balkenkreuz, a black Greek cross on white, replaced the earlier marking from late March 1918 (especially in early April — Richthofen's last Dr.I, 425/17, was changed over just before he was killed), although the last order on the subject, standardising the new national marking, was dated 25 June 1918.

== Final year ==
Between January and September 1918 German pilots shot down 3,732 Allied planes while losing 1,099 aircraft. By the end of the war, the German Army Air Service possessed a total of 2,709 frontline aircraft, 56 airships, 186 balloon detachments and about 4,500 flying personnel. After the war ended in German defeat, the service was dissolved completely on 8 May 1920 under the conditions of the Treaty of Versailles (Article 198), which demanded that its aeroplanes be completely handed over to the Allies (Art. 202).

== Statistics ==
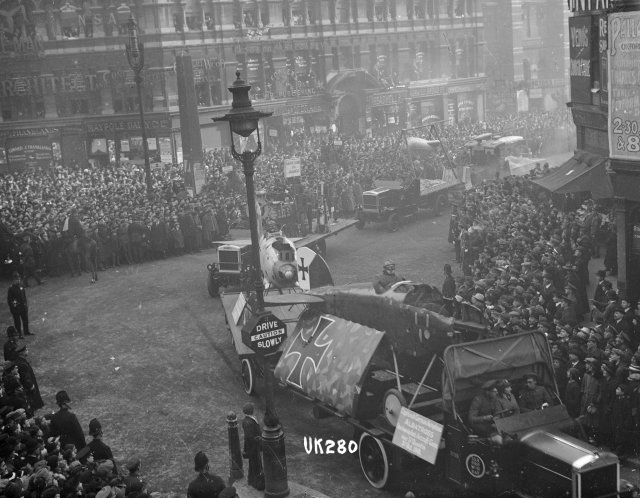
Captured aircraft being paraded in London, 1918

German casualties totalled 4,579 aircrew and 299 ground personnel killed, 1,372 missing/prisoner and 5,123 wounded, along with 1,962 men killed in flying accidents in Germany. Material losses by enemy action were 3,126 aircraft, 546 balloons and 26 airships. Although adding up all of the confirmed kills by Allied aces, gives a total of a little under 5,000 German aircraft destroyed, as well 600 observation balloons to just 3,000 Allied planes and 370 observation balloons. According to other sources, the Luftstreitkräfte shot down 7,783 Allied aircraft (7,425 Western Front, 358 Eastern Front) and 614 captive balloons. In addition, 1,588 Allied aircraft and 2 airships were shot down by German anti-aircraft guns.

== See also ==
- German Air Force
- Luftstreitkräfte der NVA
- Luftwaffe

== Sources ==
- Baughen, G. (2014). Blueprint for Victory: Britain's First World War Blitzkrieg Air Force. Stroud: Fonthill Media. ISBN 978-1-78155-392-3.
- Baughen, G. (2019) [2018]. The Rise and Fall of the French Air Force: French Air Operations and Strategy 1900–1940. Stroud: Fonthill Media. ISBN 978-1-78155-644-3.
- Franks, N. L. R.; Bailey, F. W.; Guest, R. (1993). Above the Lines: The Aces and Fighter Units of the German Air Service, Naval Air Service and Flanders Marine Corps 1914–1918. London: Grub Street. ISBN 0-948817-73-9.
- Grey, P. L.; Thetford, O. (1970) [1962]. German Aircraft of the First World War (2nd ed.). London: Putnam. ISBN 978-0-370-00103-6.
- Guttman, Jon (Summer 2009). "Verdun: The First Air Battle for the Fighter: Part I – Prelude and Opening" (PDF). worldwar1.com. The Great War Society. p. 9. Archived from the original (PDF) on June 3, 2016.
- Hoeppner, E. W. von (1994) [1921]. Deutschlands Krieg in der Luft: Ein Rückblick auf die Entwicklung und die Leistungen unserer Heeres-Luftstreitkräfte im Weltkriege [Germany's War in the Air: A Review of the Development and the Achievements of our Army Air Force in the World War] (in German). Translated by Larned, J. Hawley (hbk. facs. repr. Battery Press ed.). Leipzig: K. F. Koehle. ISBN 0-89839-195-4.
- Jones, H. A. (2002) [1928]. The War in the Air, Being the Story of the Part played in the Great War by the Royal Air Force. Vol. II (Imperial War Museum and Naval & Military Press ed.). London: Clarendon Press. ISBN 978-1-84342-413-0.
- Neumann, G. P. (1920). Die deutschen Luftstreitkräfte im Weltkriege [The German Air Force in the Great War] (in German). Translated by Gurdon, J. E. (Hodder & Stoughton, London ed.). Berlin: Mittler. OCLC 39823845.
- Wagner, Ray; Nowarra, Heinz (1971). German Combat Planes: A Comprehensive Survey and History of the Development of German Military Aircraft from 1914 to 1945. New York City: Doubleday & Company. p. 112. OCLC 491279937.
- Wyngarden, Greg van (2006). Early German Aces of World War 1. Osprey Aircraft of the Aces (No. 73). Oxford: Osprey. ISBN 978-1-84176-997-4.
