= Jagdstaffel =

German fighter squadron

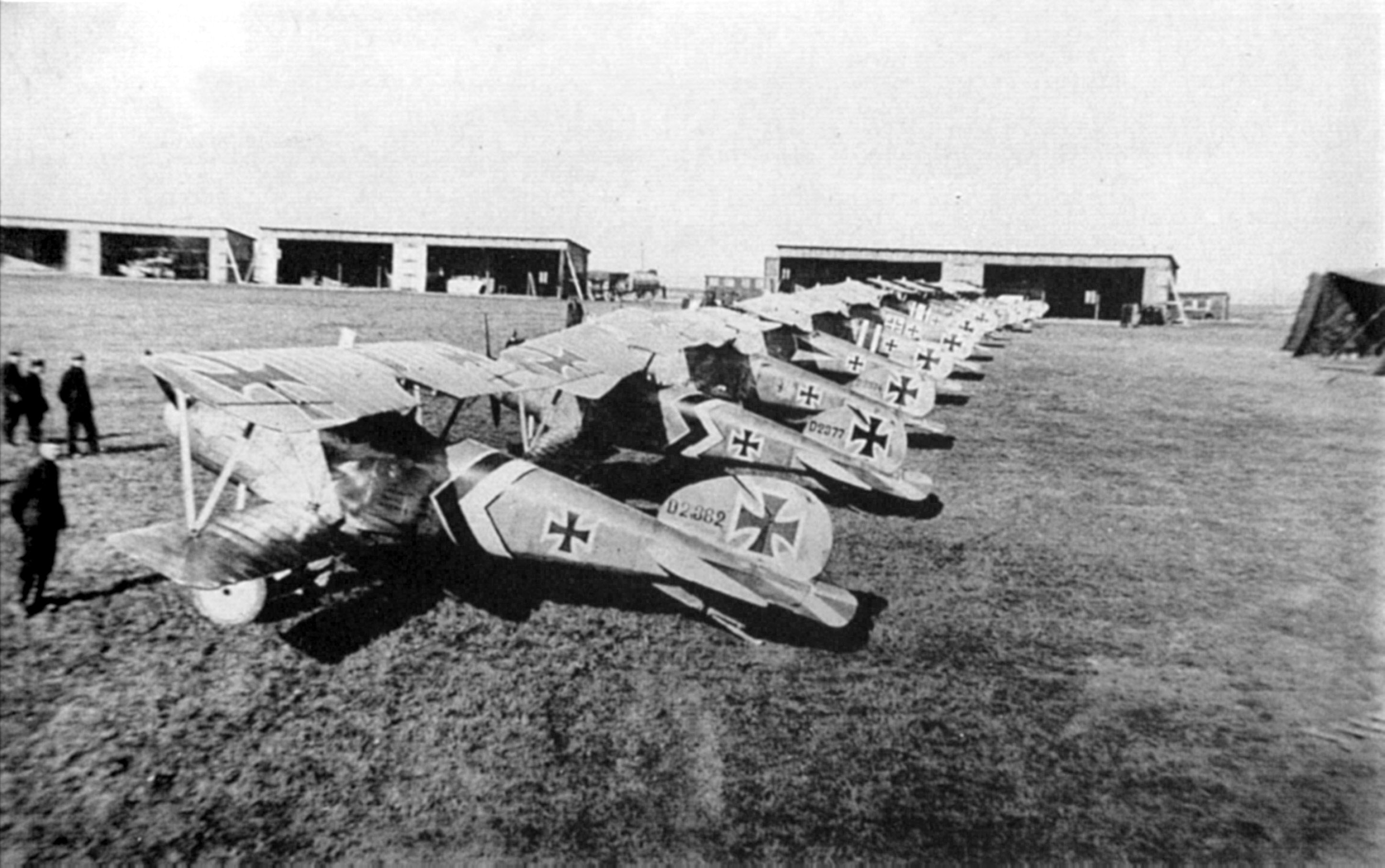
A lineup of Albatros D.III fighters of Jagdstaffel 50 - mid to late 1917. The subdued staffel scheme of black and white stripes and chevrons can be seen on the fuselage and tailplanes of most machines, which are otherwise in factory finish.

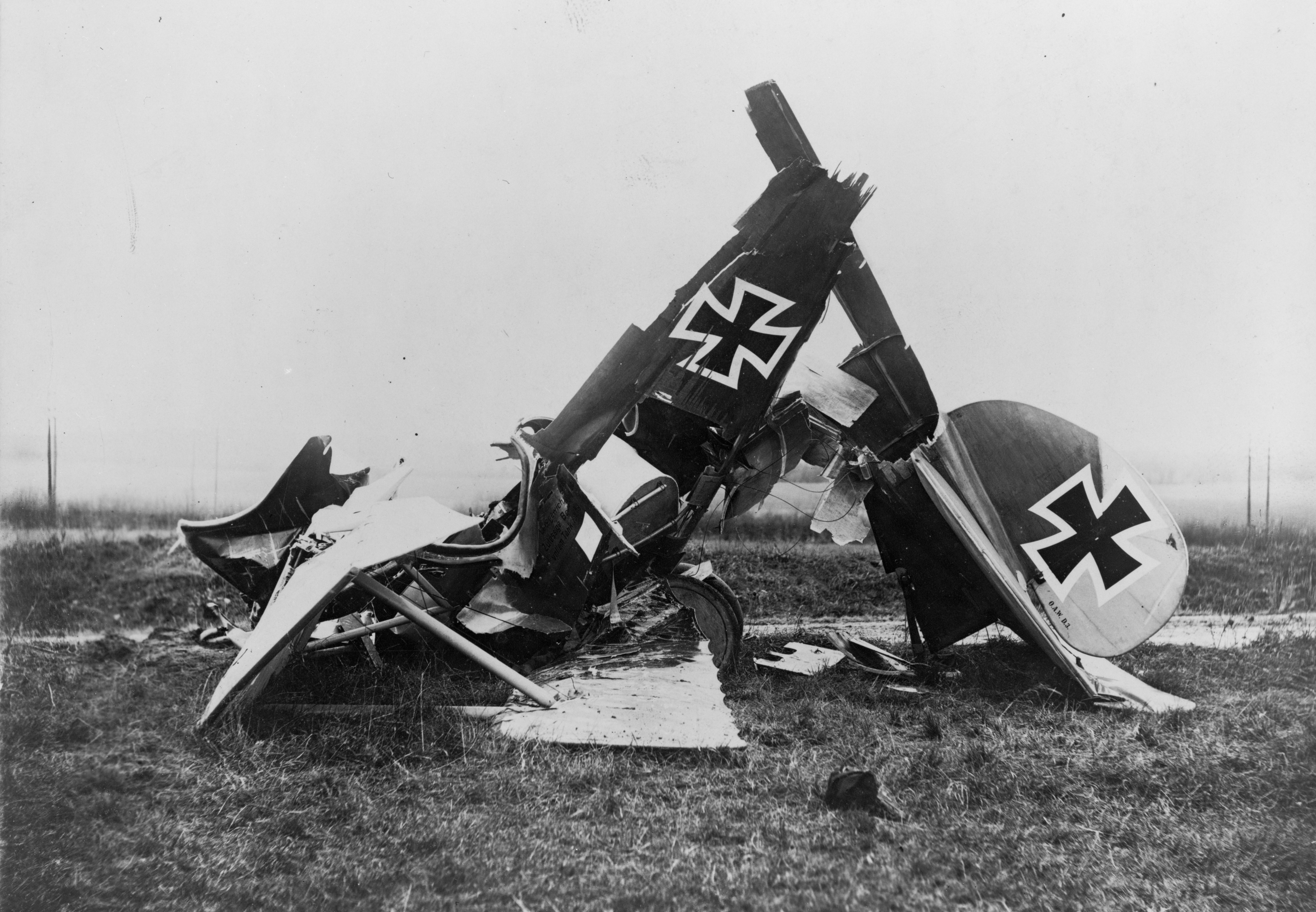
An Albatros DIII wreck Flanders 1917

A Jagdstaffel (plural Jagdstaffeln, abbreviated to Jasta) was a fighter Staffel (squadron) of the German Imperial Luftstreitkräfte during World War I. The nominal strength of a Jagdstaffel was 14 aircraft.

== Background ==
Before April 1916, Die Fliegertruppen des deutschen Kaiserreiches, which had been established in 1912 as the aviation service of the Imperial German Army, was largely organised in small general purpose units (Feldfliegerabteilungen, FFA Field Flyer Detachments). The first specialist bombing and close support units began forming during 1915. The FFA were subordinate to the Army command to which they were attached.

By the end of the spring of 1915, the first German fighter aircraft were being issued in small numbers to the FFA. At this period their function was seen almost entirely as "protection" for the reconnaissance missions which were the primary duty of the Fliegertruppe. Pilots like Kurt Wintgens, Max Immelmann and Oswald Boelcke pioneered the aggressive use of the early Fokker Eindecker fighters but it was to be almost a year before the first specialist fighter units joined the Luftstreitkräfte.

In February 1916, the first step towards fighter-only units began, with the establishment by Inspektor-Major Friedrich Stempel of units described variously as Fokkerstaffeln or Kampfeinsitzer Kommando (KEK, single-seat battle unit) formations. Fighter aircraft already in service and their pilots were detached from the general-purpose FFA units and brought together in pairs and quartets at important locations. Such units were formed at Vaux, Avillers, Jametz, Cunel and other places along the Western Front as Luftwachtdienst (aerial guard service) units, consisting only of fighters. This process was by no means universally welcomed, nor did it bring immediate success. By April 1916, the air superiority established by the Eindecker pilots in the Fokker Scourge had long gone and the Eindeckers were giving way to the Fokker and Halberstadt D-series biplane fighters.

== History ==
In the aftermath of the Battle of Verdun, during which the German side lost the air superiority built up over the Western Front during the so-called Fokker Scourge and as a result of the superior performance of the Royal Flying Corps (RFC) and the French Aéronautique Militaire during the Battle of the Somme, the German flying service was reorganised, greatly expanded and renamed the Deutschen Luftstreitkräfte (German Air Service) reflecting a far greater degree of autonomy, although it remained an integral part of the army and acquired a far greater number and variety of specialist units, including Jagdstaffeln (hunting squadrons), the first German single-seater fighter units.

A target was set to establish 37 new squadrons in the next 12 months, equipped with up-to-date single-seat fighters and manned by specially selected and trained pilots, to counter the successes of the Allied fighter squadrons operated by the RFC and the French Aéronautique Militaire. Boelcke, the leading fighter pilot of the day, was called on to organise the manning, equipment and training of Jasta 2 which was to become the model for these new squadrons. Initially Jasta 2 was equipped with a motley collection of fighters, including early Fokker and Halberstadt "D" types. In September, the squadron began to receive the first Albatros D.I fighters, that created the German air superiority of the first half of 1917. Boelcke was killed in an aerial collision on 28 October but his tactics, especially formation flying and a combination of aggression and prudence known as the Dicta Boelcke, remained the core of Jagdstaffel practice in the Luftstreitkräfte fighter arm for the rest of the war. Several pilots of Jasta 2 trained by Boelcke, became fighter leaders, notably Manfred von Richthofen.

By April 1917, the Jagdstaffeln had established air superiority on the Western Front (known since as Bloody April and still regarded as the most disastrous period in the history of British military aviation). This ascendancy was not to last, as new allied fighters (most famously, the S.E.5a, the Sopwith Camel and the SPAD S.XIII) were already starting to come into service, all of which more than matched the last of the Albatros fighters to see squadron service, the disappointing D.V/D.Va.

The Jagdstaffeln concentrated on hindering the work of the Allied two-seater corps reconnaissance and bombing squadrons. Offensive incursions by fighters any distance behind Allied lines were avoided, as were mass confrontations with large allied fighter formations, on the grounds that such operations risked attrition that the Luftstreitkräfte could ill-afford. (Note: Other types of Luftstreitkräfte unit were used offensively but units undertaking strategic bombing, long range reconnaissance and ground support of German ground units, especially during offensives, were expected to operate without fighter escort.)

Publicity for successful German fighter pilots and the cult of the Air ace rapidly established the status of their squadrons as elite units, which became associated with the kingdoms of the German Empire. Most Jagdstaffeln (eventually about 67 of them) were considered to be Prussian while other such units were associated with Bavaria, Saxony and Württemberg. The Bavarian Jagdstaffeln in particular were associated for organisational and supply purposes with the (theoretically independent) Bavarian army, which did not add to overall efficiency in these departments.

To obtain a local and temporary air superiority, larger fighter units were established, composed of several Jagdstaffeln, known as Jagdgeschwader and Jagdgruppen (Fighter Wing and Fighter Group). These units were moved from one section of the front to another as the tactical situation demanded. The most famous of these units was Jagdgeschwader 1 composed of Jagdstaffeln 4, 6, 10 and 11, commanded by Richthofen until he was killed, many of which flew the supremely manoeuvrable Fokker Dr.I triplane from the autumn of 1917. By March 1918, there were 80 Jagdstaffeln in the Luftstreitkräfte, most of them equipped with Albatros D.Vs. A long overdue re-equipment with new types began, most notably the Fokker D.VII, which for the first time since mid-1917, gave the Jagdstaffeln equipment that matched their opponents'.

== Personal colour schemes ==
German aircraft left the factory in a standard finish, although this differed from one manufacturer to another. Clear varnish on fabric and wooden surfaces had changed by 1916 to various camouflage schemes. In the Jagdstaffeln this gave way to a riot of colour, as pilots repainted their machines as they pleased. In January 1917, when he took over Jasta 11, Richthofen celebrated by painting his Albatros red and the squadron followed suit, painting at least part of their machines red. Other Jagdstaffeln soon adopted the fashion until few fighters flew in the manufacturers' finish, their fuselages in particular at least sporting the pilot's monogram or perhaps his favourite colour(s), even if the wings (as was often the case) remained in camouflage. A squadron theme was sometimes followed, with machines decorated in similar colours or with similar motifs but generally personal preference seems to have been prevalent. More than one pilot (on both sides) recorded that the contrast with the plain khaki of RFC fighters was helpful in rapidly distinguishing friend from foe in the hurly-burly of a dogfight and might have aided the accreditation of air victories claimed by individual German pilots.

== Gallery ==
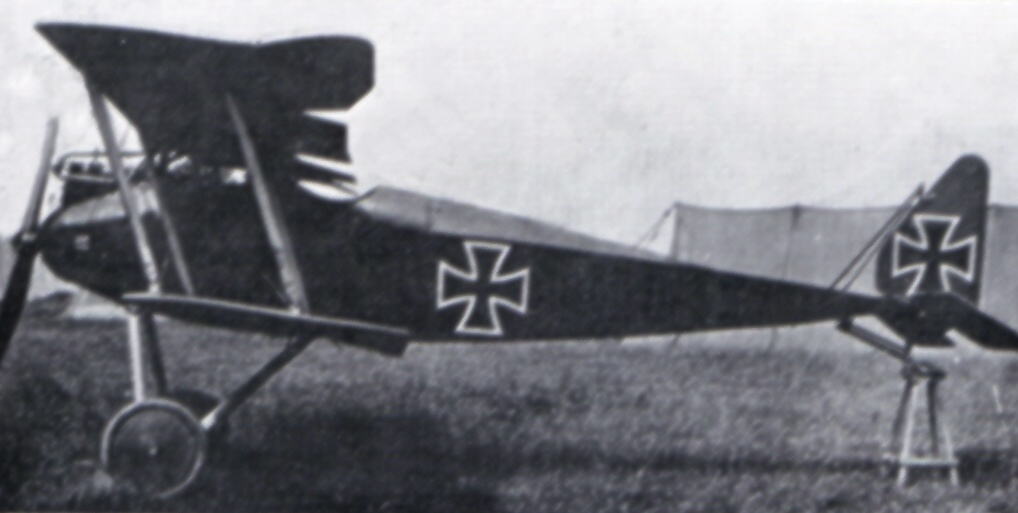
Halberstadt D II reportedly flown by Boelcke of Jasta 2

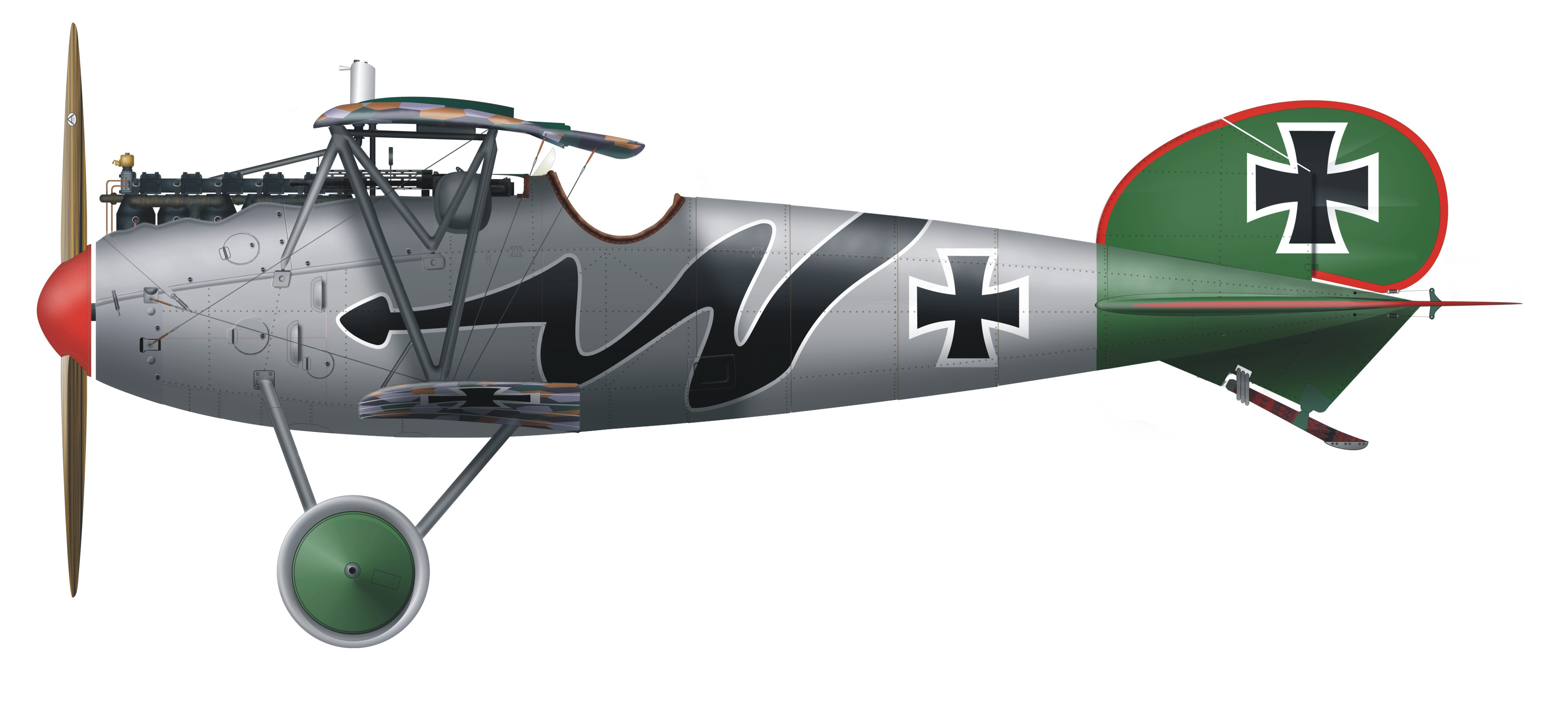
Albatros D.Va, Hans von Hippel, Jasta 5

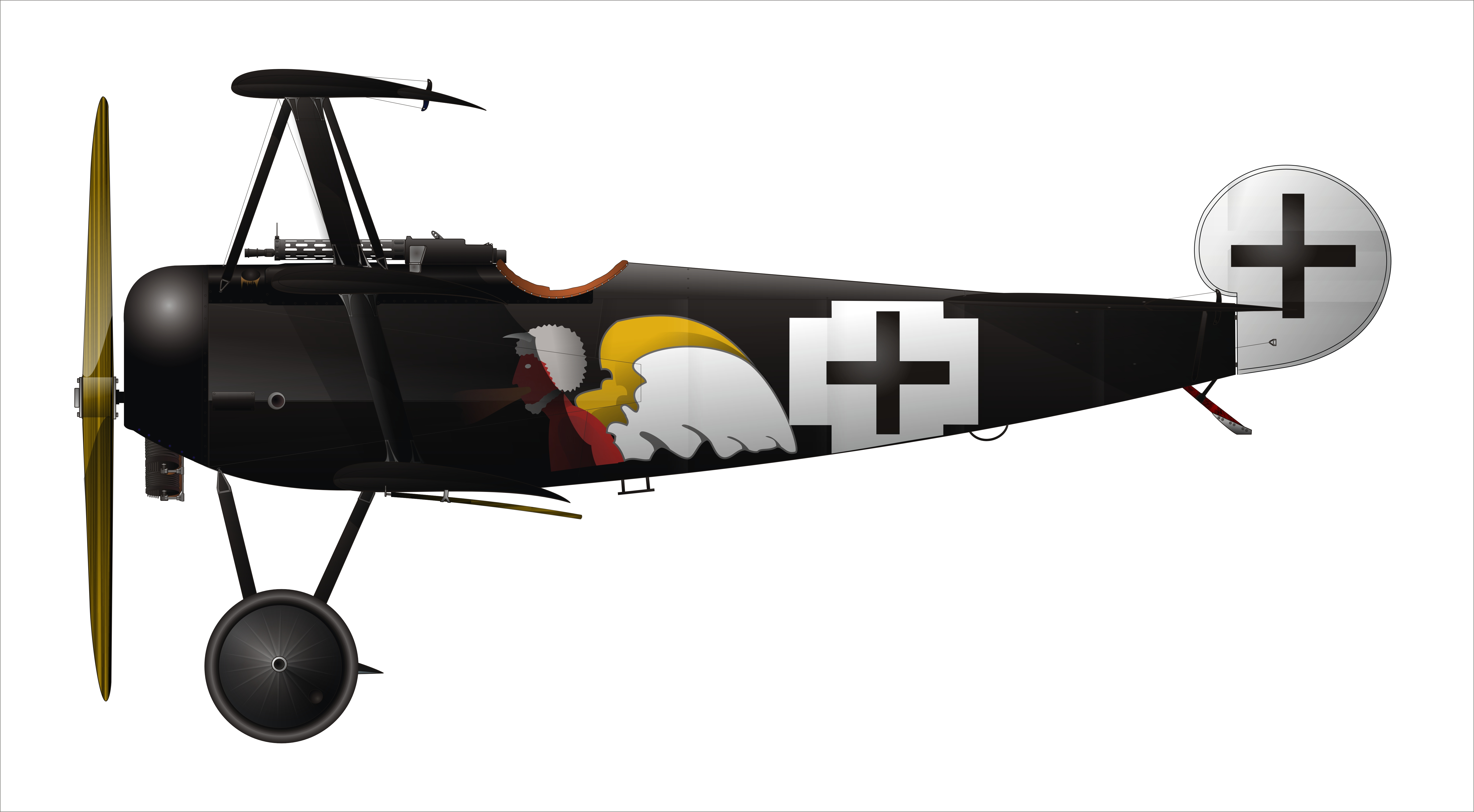
Fokker DR I of Josef Jacobs of Jasta 7

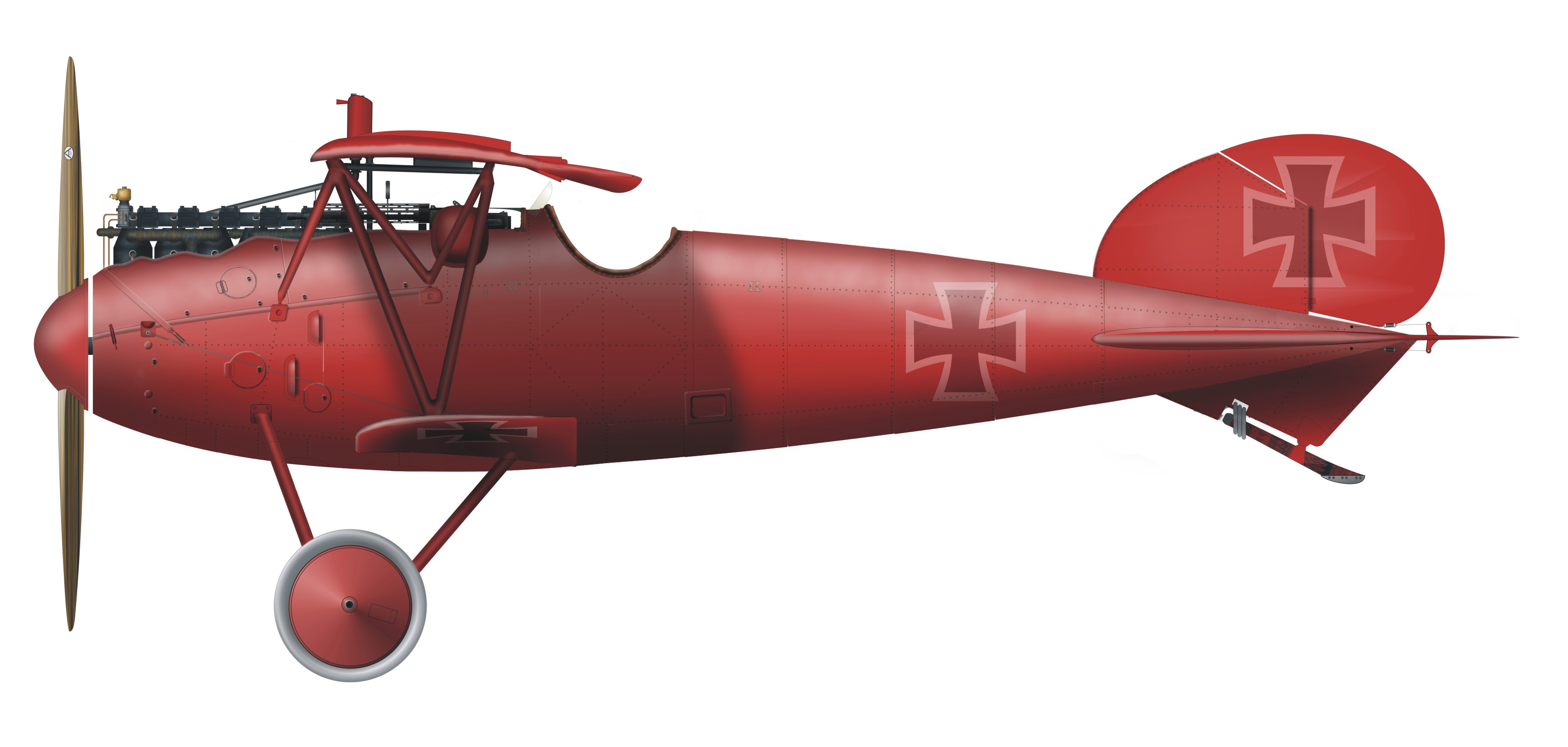
Albatros D.V of Manfred von Richthofen, Jasta 11

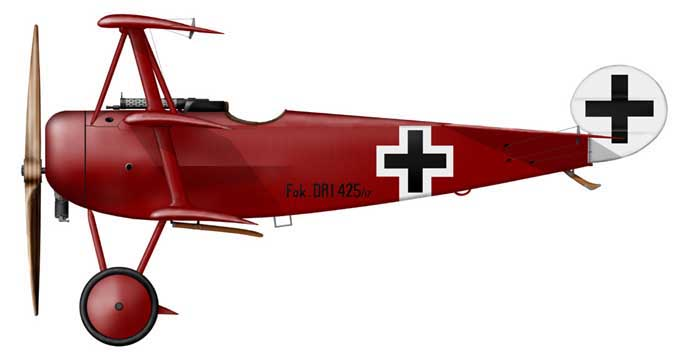
Fokker DR I of Manfred von Richthofen

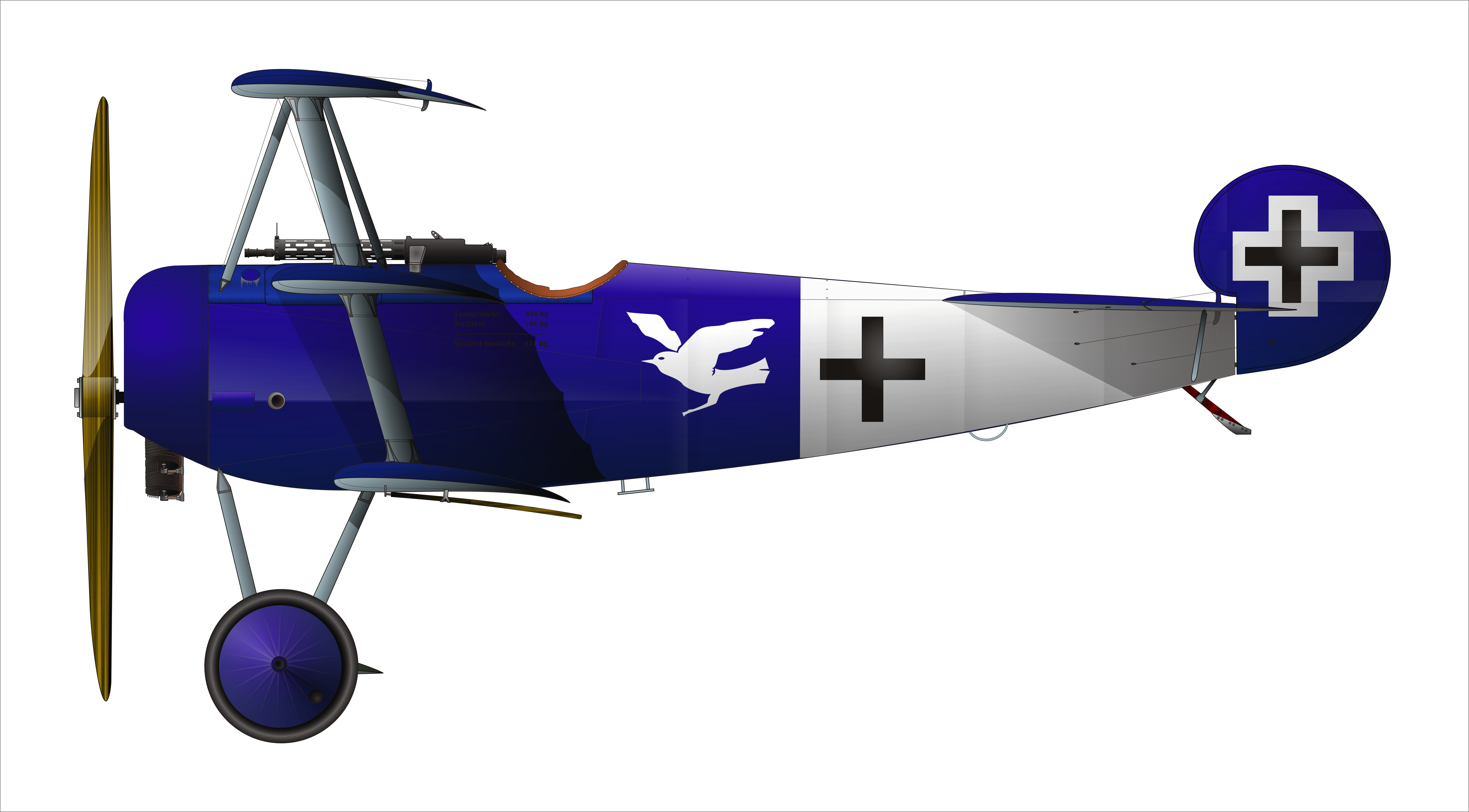
Fokker Dr. I of Lt Raben Jasta 15

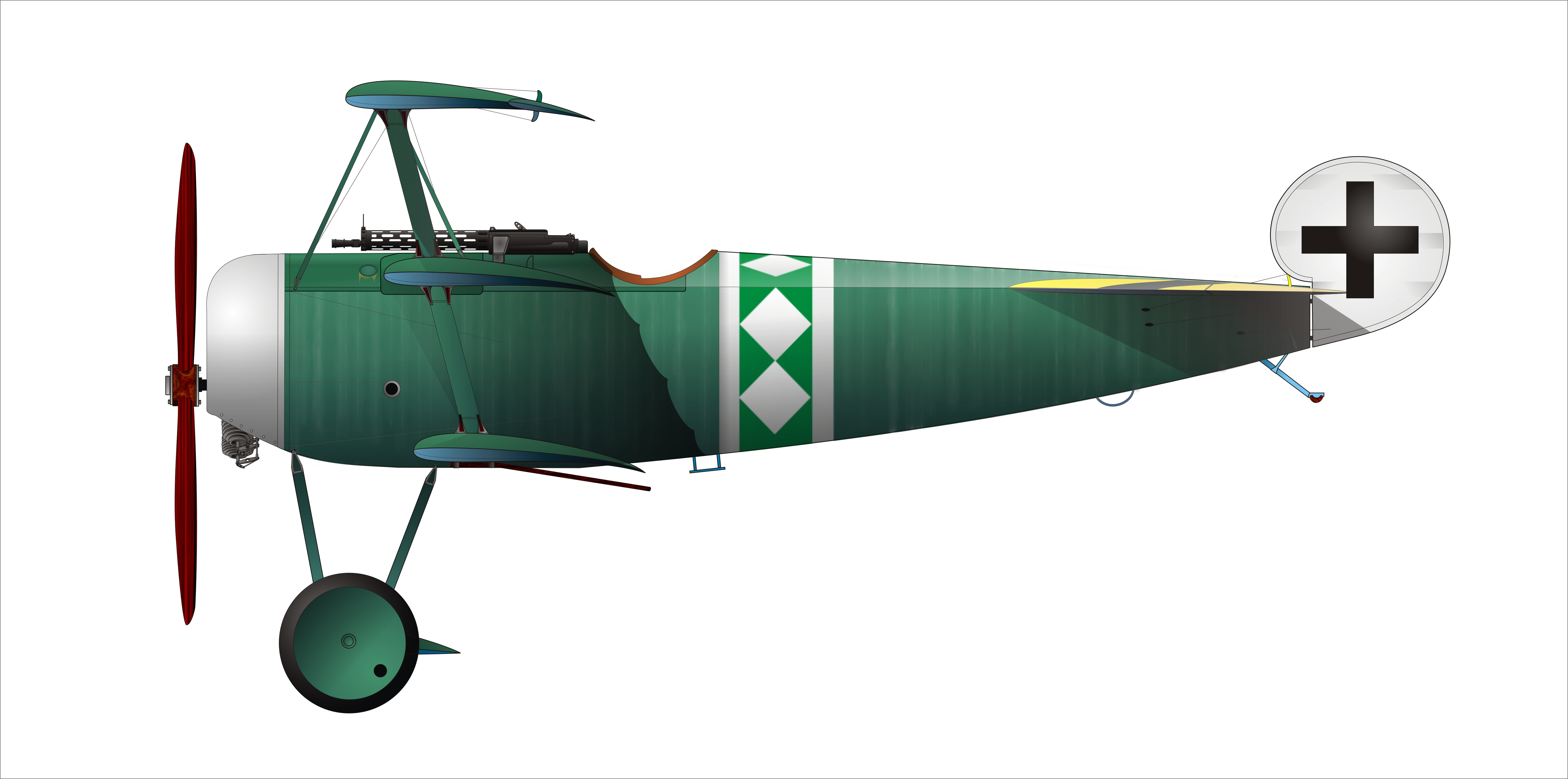
Fokker Dr. I of Leutnant Pippart, Jasta 19

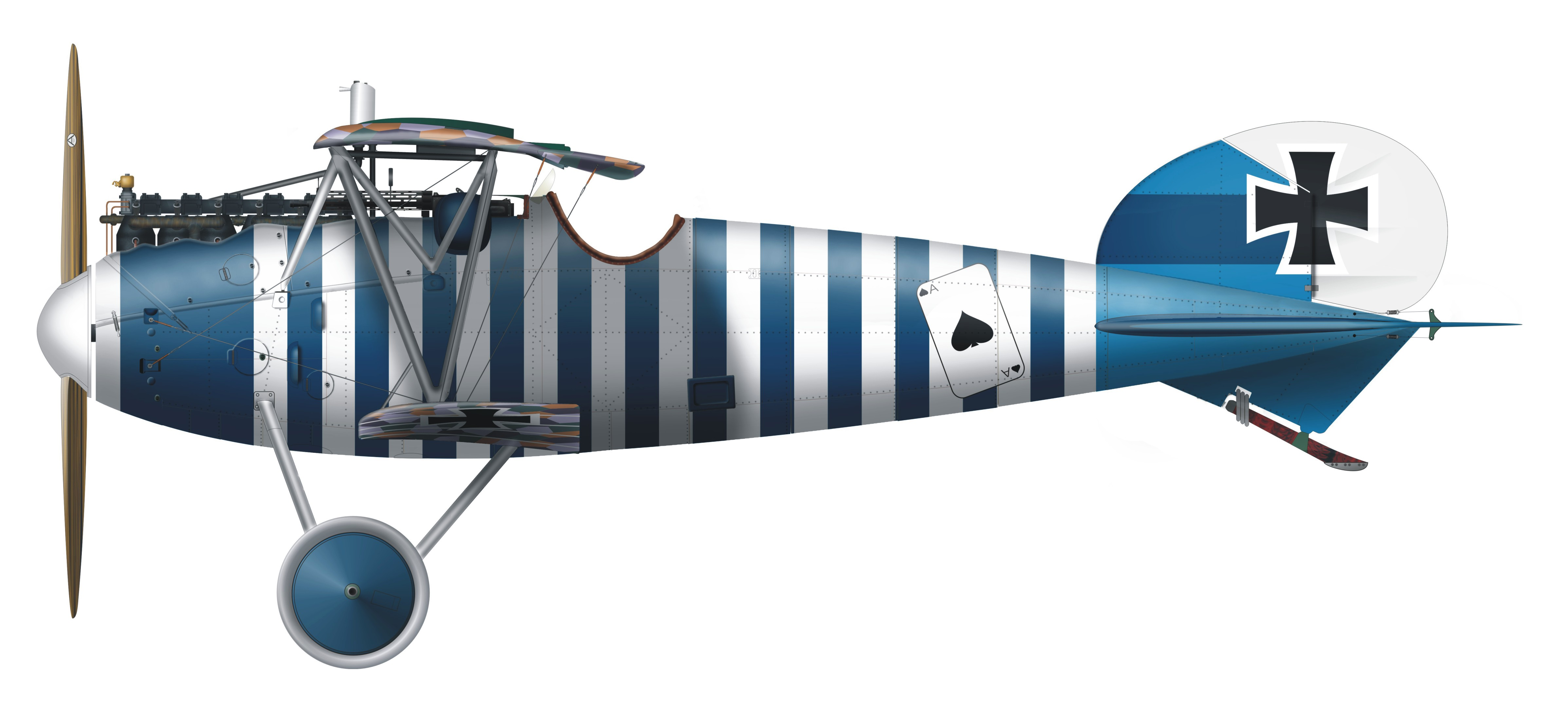
Albatros D.Va of Hans Böhning, Jasta 79

== Famous Jagdstaffeln ==
- Jasta 1
- Jasta 2 (Jasta Boelcke)
- Jasta 5
- Jasta 11
- Jasta 15
- Jasta 18

== Bibliography ==
- Franks, Norman; Bailey, Frank W. & Guest, Russell F. (1991). Above The Lines: The Aces and Fighter Units of the German Air Service, Naval Air Service and Flanders Marine Corps, 1914–1918. London: Grub Street. ISBN 978-0-948817-19-9.
- Franks, Norman (1998). Jasta War Chronology: A Complete Listing of Claims and Losses, August 1916–November 1918. London: Grub Street. ISBN 978-1-898697-84-8.
- Gray, Peter & Thetford, Owen (1970) [1962]. German Aircraft of the First World War (2nd ed.). London: Putnam. ISBN 978-0-370-00103-6.
- Guttman, Jon (Summer 2009). "Verdun: The First Air Battle for the Fighter: Part I - Prelude and Opening" (PDF). Relevance. 18 (3). The Great War Society: 9. OCLC 34567862. Archived from the original (PDF) on June 3, 2016.
- Lamberton, W. M. (1962). Cheesman, E. F. (ed.). Reconnaissance & Bomber Aircraft of the 1914–1918 War. Letchworth: Harleyford. OCLC 774660042.
- Robertson, Bruce (1957). Aircraft Camouflage and Markings 1907–1954. Letchworth: Harleyford. OCLC 762271927.
- Shacklady, Edward & Treadwell, Terry C. (2002). Classic WWI Aircraft Profiles. London: Cerberus. ISBN 978-1-84145-102-2.
