= Hermann von der Lieth-Thomsen =

German Luftwaffe general (1867–1942)

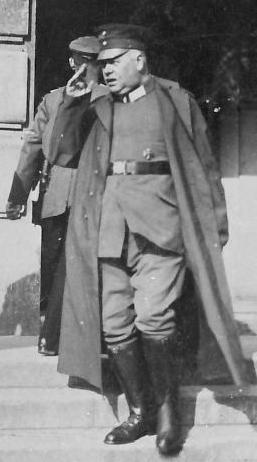
- Lieutenant Colonel von der Lieth-Thomsen c. 1916
- Born: 10 March 1867; Flensburg, Prussia, German Confederation
- Died: 5 May 1942 (aged 75); Sylt, Nazi Germany
- Burial place: Invalidenfriedhof Cemetery, Berlin
- Relatives: Joachim von der Lieth-Thomsen
- Military career
- Allegiance: German Empire; Nazi Germany
- Branch: Luftstreitkrafte (German Empire); Luftwaffe
- Service years: 1887–1919; 1935–1942
- Rank: General of Flying (General der Flieger)
- Conflicts: World War I World War II
- Awards: Pour le Mérite

General Hermann von der Lieth-Thomsen (born Hermann Thomsen; 10 March 1867 – 5 May 1942) was a German military aviation pioneer, a senior air commander in the Imperial German Army Air Service during World War I, and a founding father of the German military aviation.

== Early life and military career ==
Hermann Thomsen was born on 10 March 1867 in Flensburg which had recently been lost by the Kingdom of Denmark and incorporated into Prussia. Born into a farming family from Dithmarschen, Thomsen's grandfather Peter Thomsen was married to Martha von der Lieth and since she was the last of her family, the couple received permission to use the combined name "von der Lieth-Thomsen".

Lieth-Thomsen joined the Prussian Army in 1887, serving first as a pioneer officer.

In January 1908, the German General Staff established a technical staff to monitor foreign and domestic progress in aviation, motorized transport and telegraphy. Captain Thomsen was appointed as its head, serving under Erich Ludendorff. Thomsen served on the General Staff until February 1914 when he was transferred to the staff of the 2nd Railway Regiment. However, he was soon transferred again and at the start of August Thomsen took up post as the Investigation Officer for Airship Guidance at Posen.

== World War I ==
In March 1915, von der Lieth-Thomsen was appointed Chief of Field Air Forces (Chef des Feldflugwesens) for the German Army. At this stage he held the rank of Major which was far more junior than the rank of his opposite numbers in the Royal Flying Corps. In October the following year, with the reorganization of the German Army Air Services into the Luftstreitkräfte, Thomsen, by now a lieutenant-colonel, was named Chief of Staff to Ernst von Hoeppner, the newly appointed Commanding General of the Air Service. He served as Air Force Chief of Staff until after the end of World War I.

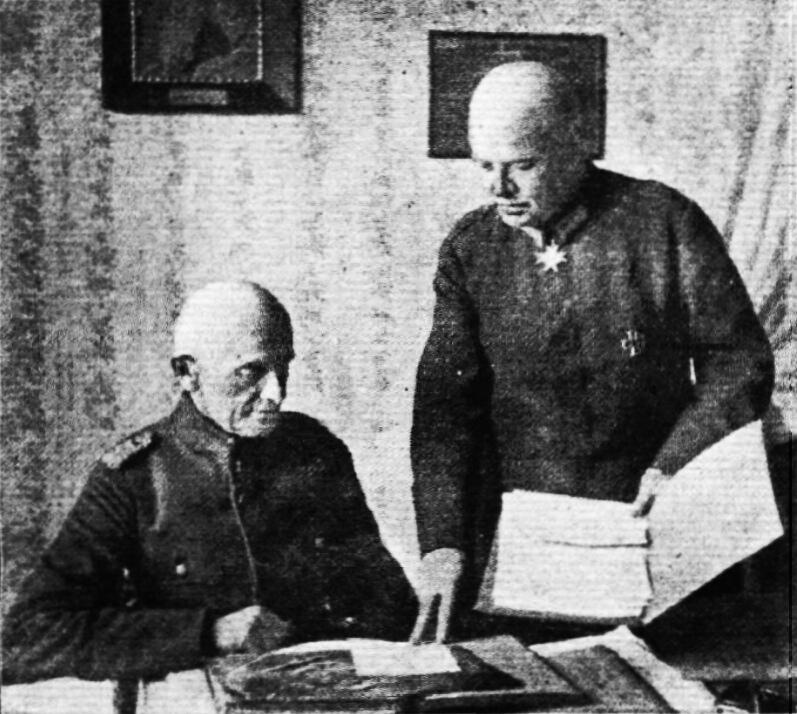
Thomsen (right) in consultation with his commanding general, Ernst von Hoeppner, 1918

In 1917, von der Lieth-Thomsen was awarded the Pour le Mérite even though as a senior commander he was not directly involved in air combat. The award was resented by some of his junior officers. His son, Joachim von der Lieth-Thomsen, was hit by anti-aircraft fire from a ship while he was flying over the Thames Estuary in July 1917 and died a few days before the armistice as a POW.

== Inter-war years ==
After the end of World War I, Germany was required to disestablish her Air Services. Lieth-Thomsen served in the Aviation Department of the Prussian War Ministry during January and February 1919 and was then assigned to other duties at the War Ministry. However, he resigned his position and retired from military service as a colonel in August 1919.

In the 1920s, Lieth-Thomsen actively participated in the German efforts to build a secret Air Force in the Soviet Union. In 1923, he first made contact with the Soviets and in 1925 he was instrumental in establishing the German military mission in the Soviet Union, establishing the Lipetsk fighter-pilot school.

During the 1920s, he developed serious eye problems which eventually led to his blindness. In 1928 he moved back to the island of Sylt in his native Schleswig-Holstein.

== Luftwaffe service ==
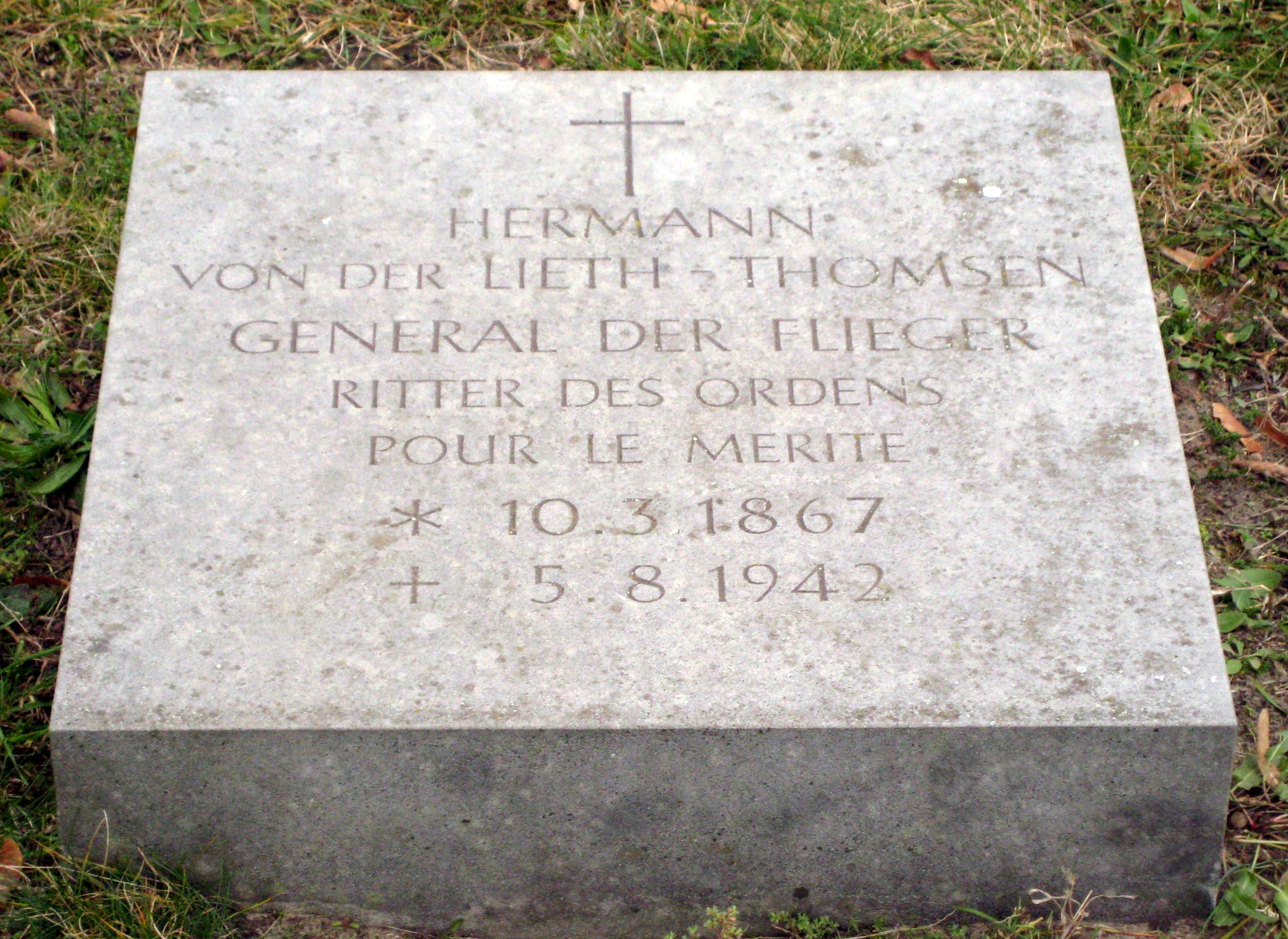
Von der Lieth-Thomsen's gravestone in the Invalidenfriedhof Cemetery

Despite his blindness, when the Luftwaffe was established in 1935 under Hermann Göring, Lieth-Thomsen re-entered military service as Head of the Military Science at the Reich Air Ministry. He was granted the rank of major general. He held this post until his death in 1942, receiving promotions to lieutenant general and General der Flieger before the outbreak of World War II.

Hermann von der Lieth-Thomsen died on 5 May 1942 in Sylt and was buried in the Invalidenfriedhof Cemetery in Berlin.

== Awards and decorations ==
- Iron Cross (1914)
  - 2nd Class
  - 1st Class
- Knight's Cross of the House Order of Hohenzollern with Swords
- Pour le Mérite on 8 April 1917 as Oberstleutnant and Chief of General Staff of the Luftstreitkräfte
- Cross of Honor
- Wehrmacht Long Service Award 4th to 1st Class
- Combined Pilots-Observation Badge
