= Unin, West Pomeranian Voivodeship =

Unin
- Village
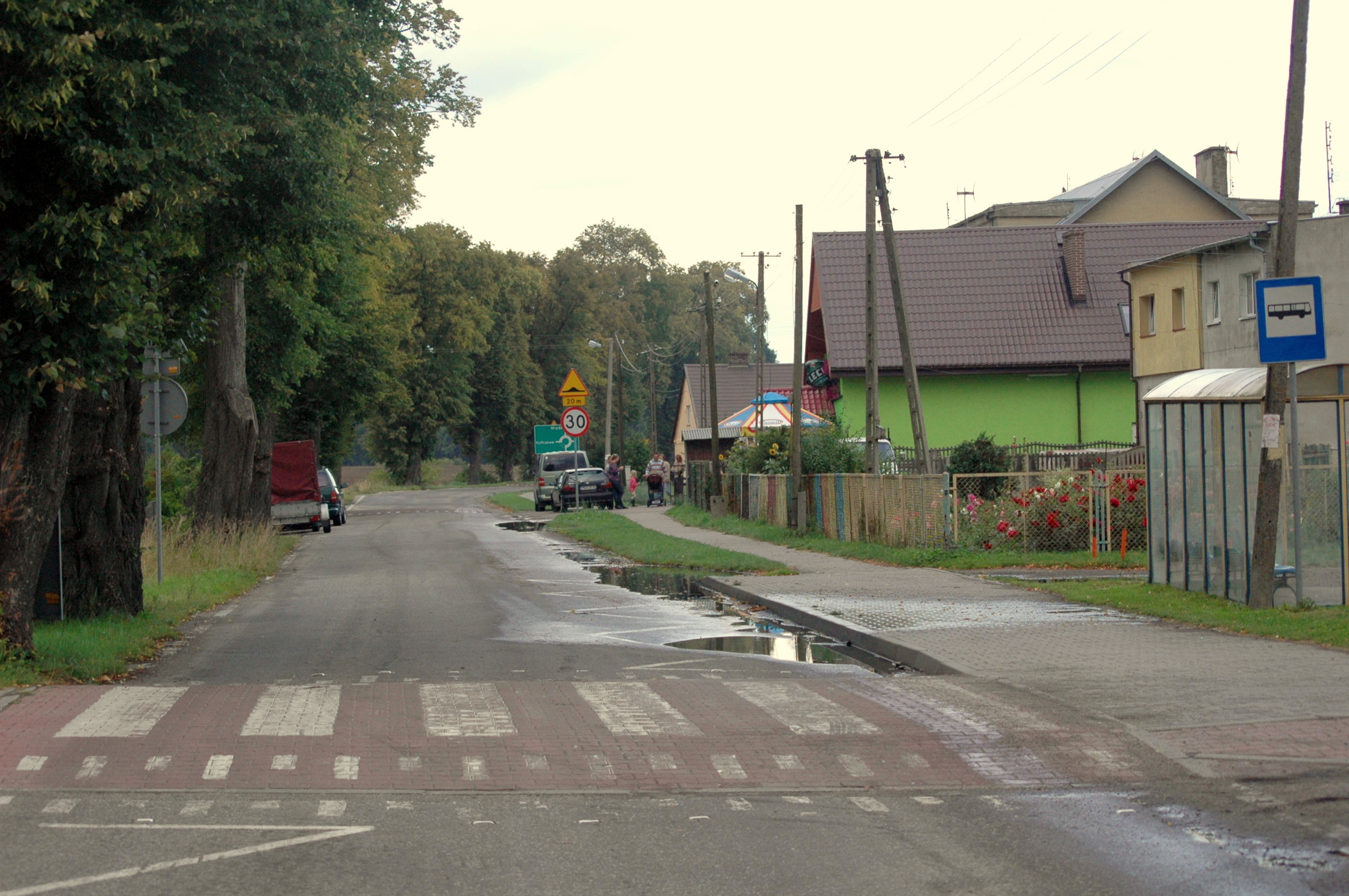

- Location within Poland
- Coordinates: 53°53′N 14°37′E
- Country: Poland
- Voivodeship: West Pomeranian
- County: Kamień
- Gmina: Wolin
- Population: 400

Unin [ˈunin] (German: Tonnin or Alt-Tonnin) is a village in the administrative district of Gmina Wolin, within Kamień County, West Pomeranian Voivodeship, in north-western Poland. It lies approximately 5 km (3 mi) north of Wolin, 15 km (9 mi) south-west of Kamień Pomorski, and 52 km (32 mi) north of the regional capital Szczecin.

The village has a population of 400.

== Notable residents ==
- Ernst von Hoeppner (1860–1922), German general
