= Cunel =

- Commune
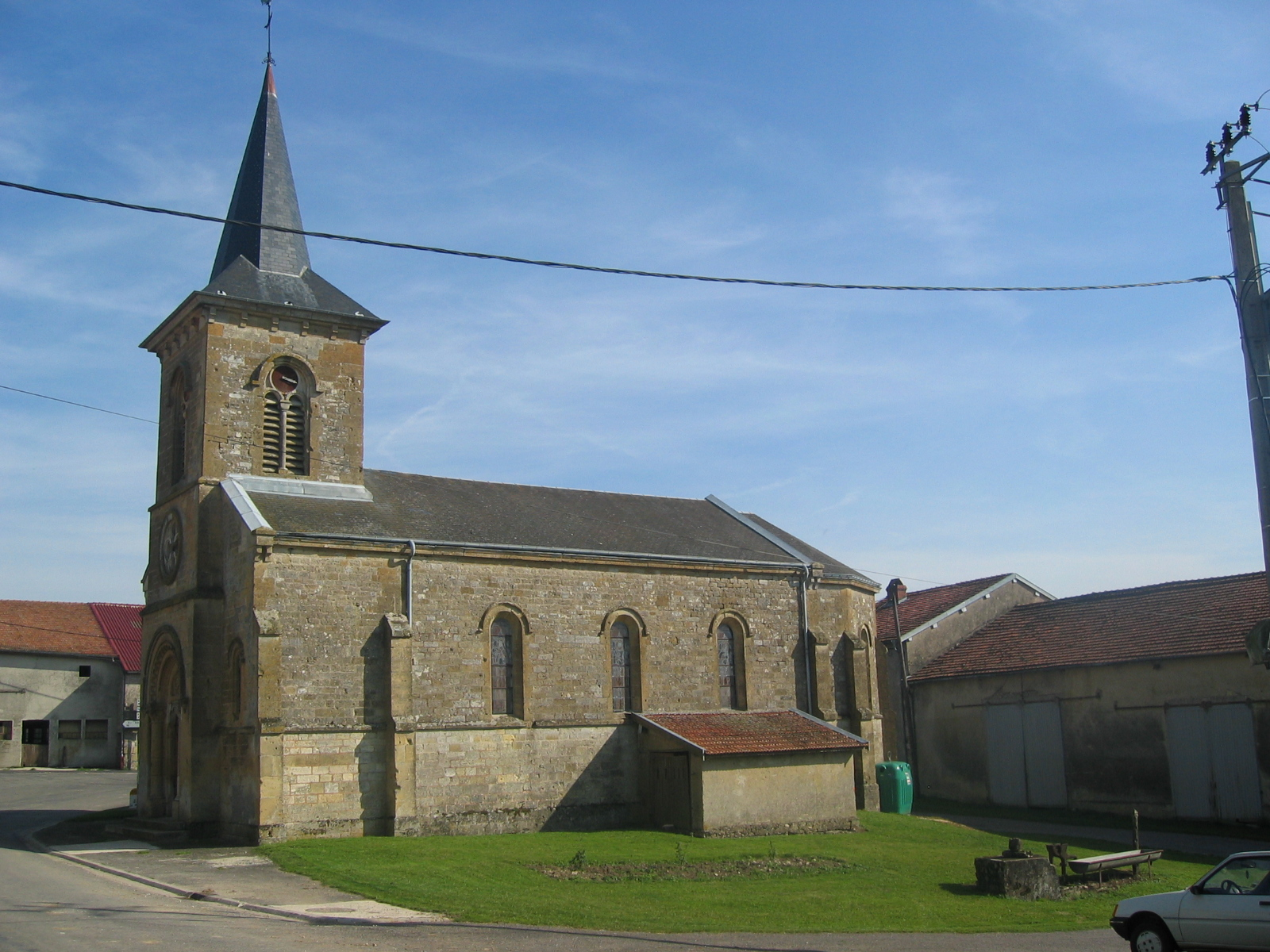
- The church in Cunel

- Coat of arms
- Location of Cunel
- Location within France Location within Grand Est
- Coordinates: 49°20′12″N 5°07′02″E
- Country: France
- Region: Grand Est
- Department: Meuse
- Arrondissement: Verdun
- Canton: Clermont-en-Argonne
- Intercommunality: Pays de Stenay et du Val Dunois

Government
  - Mayor (2020–2026): Dominique Garré
- Area^{1}: 4.69 km^{2} (1.81 sq mi)
- Elevation: 260 m (850 ft)
- Highest elevation: 301 m (988 ft)
- Lowest elevation: 224 m (735 ft)
- Population (2023): 23
  - Density: 4.9/km^{2} (13/sq mi)
- Time zone: UTC+01:00 (CET)
  - Summer (DST): UTC+02:00 (CEST)
- INSEE/Postal code: 55140 /55110
- ^{1} French Land Register data, which excludes lakes, ponds, glaciers > 1 km^{2} (0.386 sq mi or 247 acres) and river estuaries.

Cunel (French pronunciation: [kynɛl]) is a commune in the Meuse department in Grand Est in north-eastern France.

== Population ==
Historical population
Year	Pop.	±% p.a.
1968	61	—
1975	48	−3.37%
1982	40	−2.57%
1990	31	−3.14%
1999	18	−5.86%
2007	16	−1.46%
2012	14	−2.64%
2017	14	+0.00%
2023	23	+8.63%
Source: INSEE

== See also ==
- Communes of the Meuse department

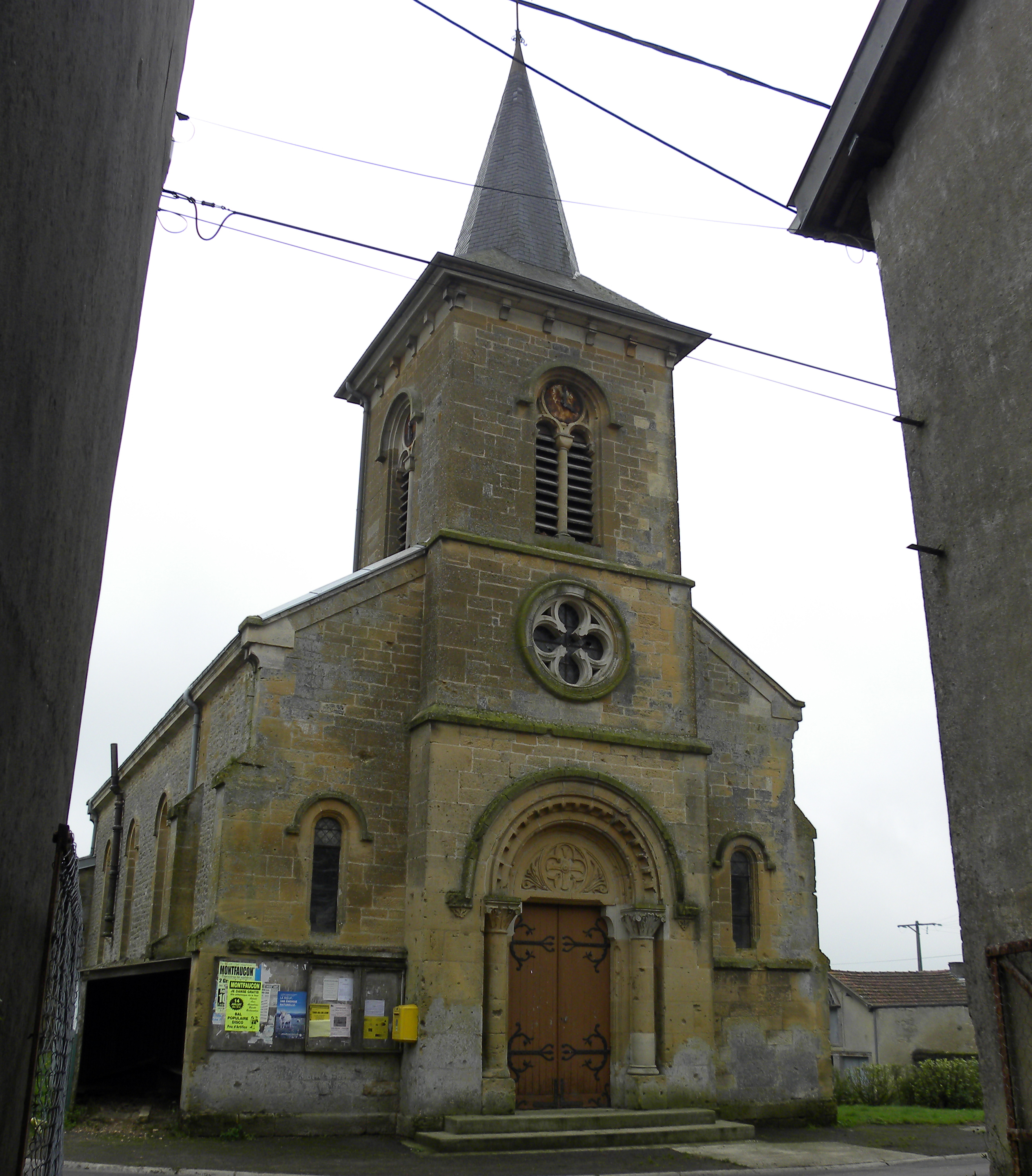
Church in the village of Cunel, France. The steeple was a German machine gun post during the Meuse-Argonne Offensive.
