= Unín (Brno-Country District) =

- Municipality
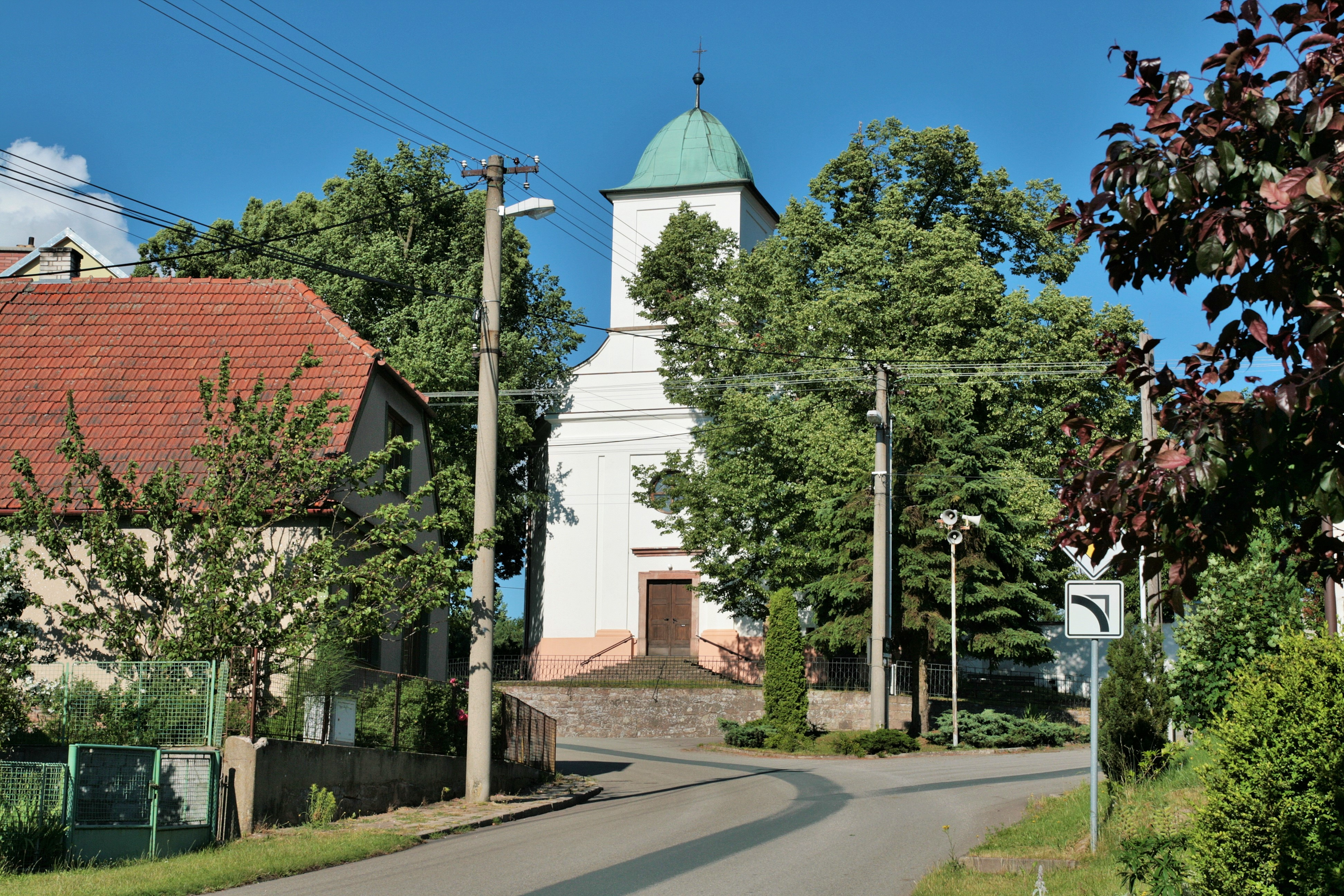
- Church of Saints Peter and Paul

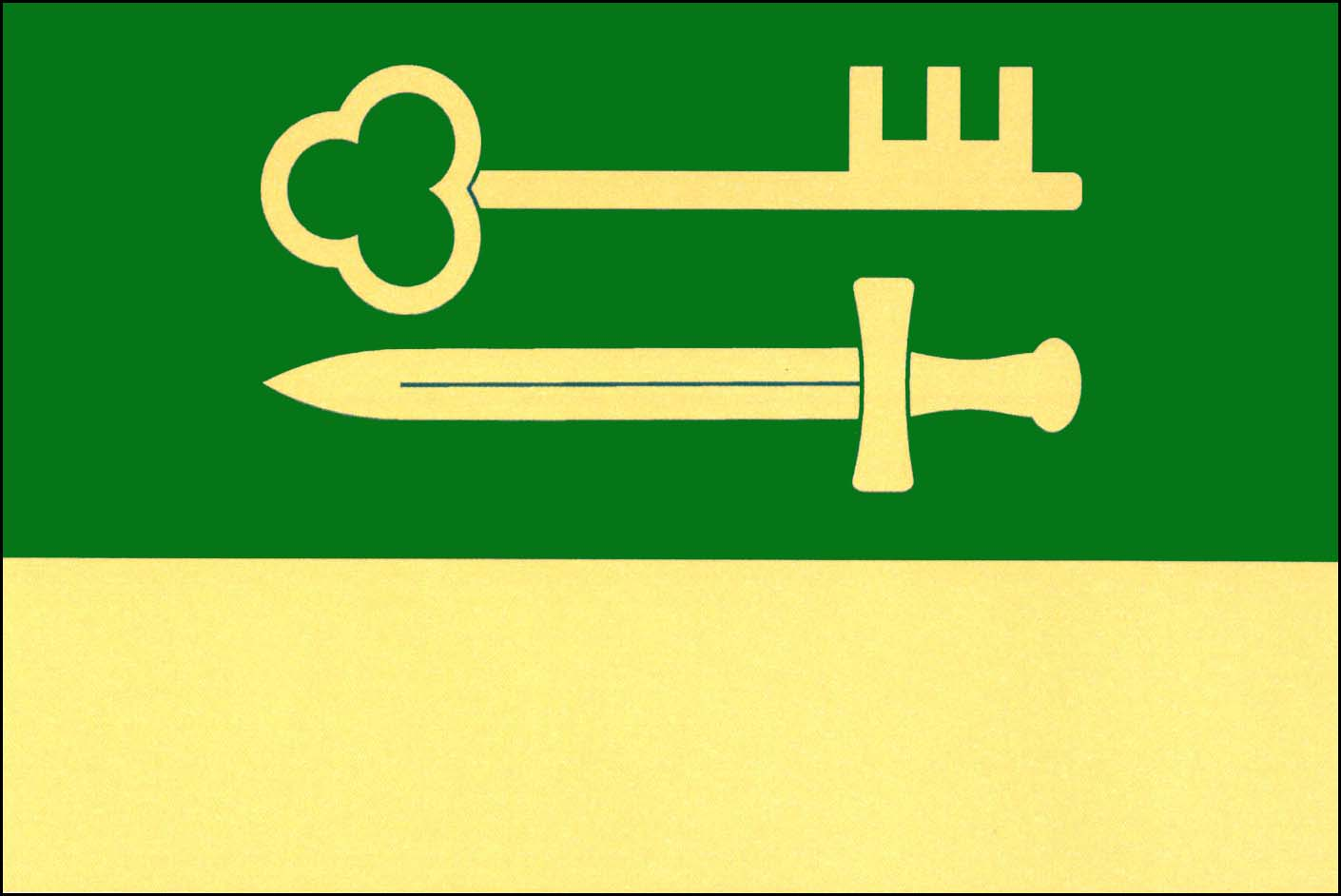
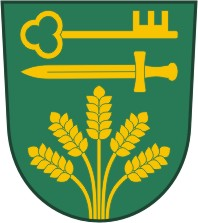
- Flag Coat of arms

- Location in the Czech Republic
- Coordinates: 49°22′56″N 16°29′29″E
- Country: Czech Republic
- Region: South Moravian
- District: Brno-Country
- First mentioned: 1349

Area
  - Total: 3.35 km^{2} (1.29 sq mi)
- Elevation: 461 m (1,512 ft)

Population (2026-01-01)
  - Total: 237
  - Density: 70.7/km^{2} (183/sq mi)
- Time zone: UTC+1 (CET)
  - Summer (DST): UTC+2 (CEST)
- Postal code: 679 24
- Website: www.unin.cz

Unín is a municipality and village in Brno-Country District in the South Moravian Region of the Czech Republic. It has about 200 inhabitants.

Unín lies approximately 23 kilometres (14 mi) north-west of Brno and 169 km (105 mi) south-east of Prague.

== Demographics ==
Historical population
Year	Pop.	±%
1869	172	—
1880	199	+15.7%
1890	211	+6.0%
1900	203	−3.8%
1910	216	+6.4%
1921	248	+14.8%
1930	222	−10.5%
1950	207	−6.8%
1961	197	−4.8%
1970	289	+46.7%
1980	213	−26.3%
1991	174	−18.3%
2001	196	+12.6%
2011	203	+3.6%
2021	221	+8.9%
Source: Censuses
