= Jametz =

- Commune
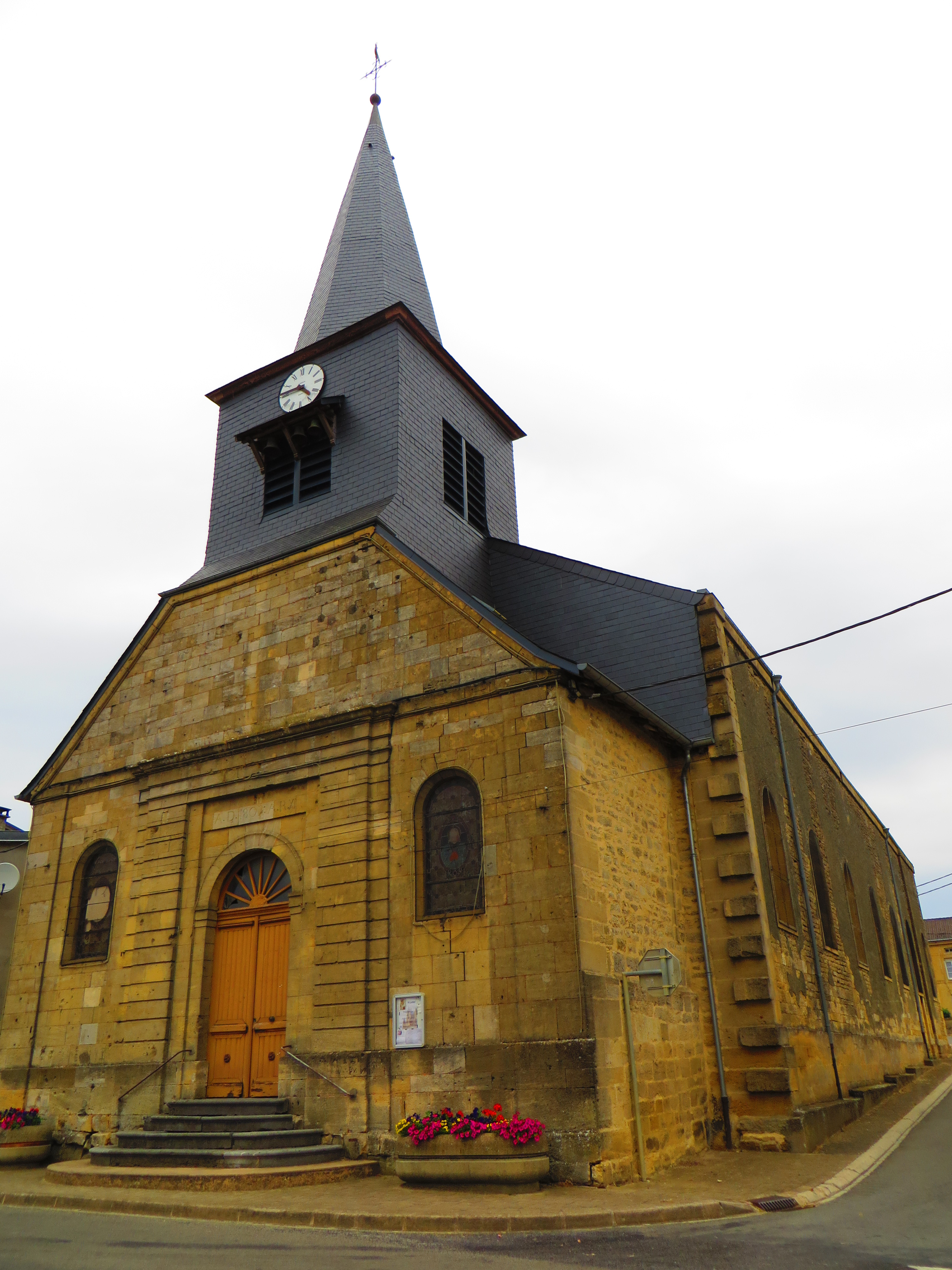
- The church in Jametz

- Coat of arms
- Location of Jametz
- Location within France Location within Grand Est
- Coordinates: 49°25′52″N 5°22′56″E
- Country: France
- Region: Grand Est
- Department: Meuse
- Arrondissement: Verdun
- Canton: Montmédy
- Intercommunality: CC du pays de Montmédy

Government
  - Mayor (2020–2026): Regis Aubry
- Area^{1}: 17.44 km^{2} (6.73 sq mi)
- Elevation: 199 m (653 ft)
- Highest elevation: 281 m (922 ft)
- Lowest elevation: 187 m (614 ft)
- Population (2023): 239
  - Density: 13.7/km^{2} (35.5/sq mi)
- Time zone: UTC+01:00 (CET)
  - Summer (DST): UTC+02:00 (CEST)
- INSEE/Postal code: 55255 /55600
- ^{1} French Land Register data, which excludes lakes, ponds, glaciers > 1 km^{2} (0.386 sq mi or 247 acres) and river estuaries.

Jametz (French pronunciation: [ʒame]) is a small commune in the Meuse department in Grand Est in north-eastern France, near the Belgian border.

== Economy ==
Since the 15th century, residents have primarily worked as cattle farmers, cheesemakers, carpenters and leatherworkers. To raise the profile of the locale's products and traditions, many inhabitants have used the placename as a surname (including variations like Jamet and Jamett).

== See also ==
- Communes of the Meuse department
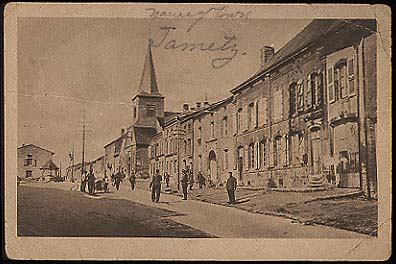
