= Unín, Skalica District =

Unín
- Municipality
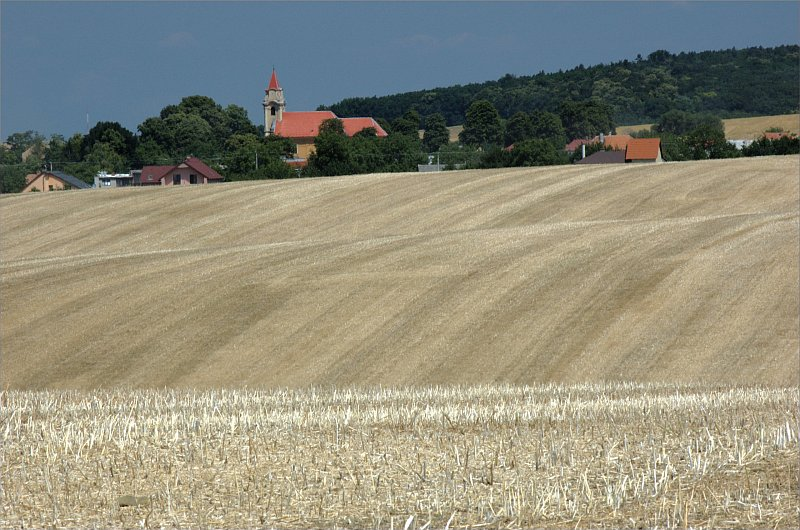

- Flag

- Location of Unín in the Trnava Region Location of Unín in Slovakia
- Coordinates: 48°44′N 17°13′E
- Country: Slovakia
- Region: Trnava Region
- District: Skalica District
- First mentioned: 1392

Area
  - Total: 22.78 km^{2} (8.80 sq mi)
- Elevation: 276 m (906 ft)

Population (2025)
  - Total: 1,149
- Time zone: UTC+1 (CET)
  - Summer (DST): UTC+2 (CEST)
- Postal code: 908 46
- Area code: +421 34
- Vehicle registration plate (until 2022): SI
- Website: unin.sk

Unín (Hungarian: Nagyúny) is a village and municipality in Skalica District in the Trnava Region of western Slovakia.

== History ==
In historical records the village was first mentioned in 1392.

== Geography ==
The municipality lies at an altitude of 276 metres (906 ft) and covers an area of 22.78 km^{2} (8.80 sq mi) (2025).

== Population ==
Population statistic (10 years)
Year	1995	2005	2015	2025
Count	1145	1179	1232	1149
Difference		+2.96%	+4.49%	−6.73%

Population statistic
Year	2024	2025
Count	1168	1149
Difference		−1.62%

It has a population of 1149 people (31 December 2025).

=== Ethnicity ===
Census 2021 (1+ %)
Ethnicity	Number	Fraction
Slovak	1141	94.61%
Not found out	58	4.8%
Czech	15	1.24%
Total	1206	

In year 2021 was 1206 people by ethnicity 1141 as Slovak, 58 as Not found out, 15 as Czech, 5 as Romani, 2 as Jewish, 2 as Romanian, 1 as Russian, 1 as German, 1 as Moravian and 1 as Other.

Note on population: The difference values of population numbers in the table "Population statistic" and in the sections "Ethnicity" & "Religion" is caused by the use of various statistical methods.

=== Religion ===
Census 2021 (1+ %)
Religion	Number	Fraction
Roman Catholic Church	927	76.87%
None	187	15.51%
Not found out	56	4.64%
Evangelical Church	12	1%
Total	1206	

In year 2021 was 1206 people by religion 927 from Roman Catholic Church, 187 from None, 56 from Not found out, 12 from Evangelical Church, 6 from Ad hoc movements, 3 from Paganism and natural spirituality, 3 from Christian Congregations in Slovakia, 3 from Other, 3 from Greek Catholic Church, 2 from Buddhism, 1 from Calvinist Church, 1 from Jehovah's Witnesses, 1 from United Methodist Church and 1 from Apostolic Church.
