= Rudolf Rienau =

German fighter ace (1898-1925)

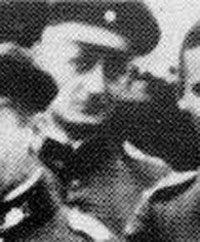
- Rienau, around 1917
- Born: 17 November 1898; Sylt, Germany
- Died: 23 May 1925 (aged 26); Staaken, Germany
- Military career
- Allegiance: Germany
- Branch: Infantry, Imperial German Air Service
- Service years: 1915–1918
- Rank: Leutnant
- Units: Jagdstaffel 1; Jagdstaffel 19

Leutnant Rudolf Rienau (17 November 1898 - 23 May 1925) was a German fighter ace and veteran member of Jagdstaffel 19, who was credited with six aerial victories during World War I. Despite his contributions to his unit, Rienau is among the only aces of Jasta 19 not to be awarded the Pour le Mérite, Iron Cross, or the Hohenzollern Order. On 13 September 1918, he was shot down and successfully bailed out of his Fokker D.VII from an altitude of just 500 metres (1,640 feet). He became a flight instructor after the war, but died in a flying accident in 1925.

== Early life and service ==
Rudolf Rienau was born on the island of Sylt off the coast of Germany and Denmark. He served in the infantry from mid-1915 until spring 1917, when in April he volunteered for pilot training under the Luftstreitkrafte.

== Aerial service ==
Rienau joined Jasta 1 in October 1917, but was quickly moved to Jasta 19 by the end of the month. It was in this Jasta in which he gained his first aerial victory in March 1918 and his second in June. At this time Rienau flew a Fokker Dr.I triplane serial 504/17, identified by white diagonal stripes along the fuselage in the fashion of other German fighter pilots with similarly customized paint schemes.

On 13 September 1918, while flying north of Charey, Rienau's Fokker D.VII was hit by fire from an American SPAD of the 13th Aero Squadron and went into a dive. After attempting to right the aircraft, he bailed out 500 metres (1,640 feet) above the ground, his Fokker crashing 150 metres (490 feet) from where he landed in his parachute. Some historians deem his survival lucky, considering nearly a third of German pilots who bailed from their aircraft died in the attempt, including fellow Jasta 19 ace and commanding officer Leutnant Hans Pippart, whose parachute didn't open in time when his Fokker went down on 11 August 1918.

He returned to combat the day after the crash, scoring his third victory against a Breguet reconnaissance aircraft. He then scored two more victories in the following days, downing a SPAD on the 15th and a Breguet on the 16th. His final victory was over another SPAD on the 29th, ending September with six kills and the title of flying ace. This tally made Rienau the third highest contributor to Jasta 19's 93 victories, tied with Walter Böning. Despite his high tally, he was one of the only aces of Jasta 19 to not be awarded the Iron Cross, an honor given to aces of equivalent scores like Leutnant Arthur Rahn and Oberleutnant Erich Hahn.

== Postwar years ==
After the war, Rienau became a flying instructor and taught throughout the early 1920s. He was killed in a flying accident at Staaken, outside of Berlin on 23 May 1925.
