= Jagdstaffel 19 =

Jasta 19
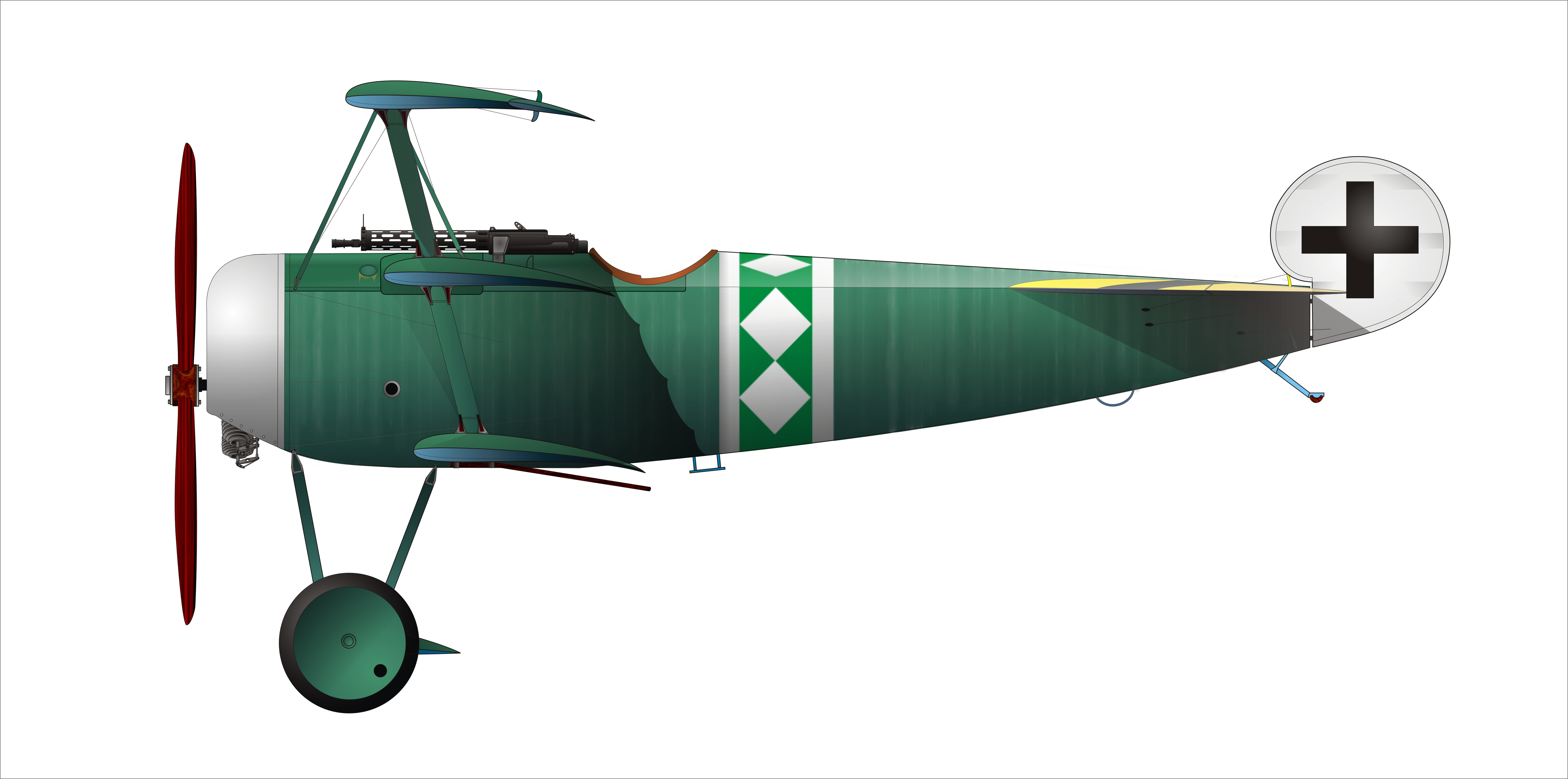
- Fokker Dr. I of Leutnant Pippart, Jasta 19.
- Active: 1916–1918
- Country: German Empire
- Branch: Luftstreitkräfte
- Type: Fighter squadron
- Part of: Jagdgeschwader II
- Engagements: World War I

Royal Prussian Jagdstaffel 19 was a World War I "hunting group" (i.e., fighter squadron) of the Luftstreitkräfte, the air arm of the Imperial German Army during World War I. As one of the original German fighter squadrons, the unit would score 92 verified aerial victories, including ten wins over enemy observation balloons.

In turn, their casualties for the war would amount to eleven pilots killed in action, four wounded in action, and one taken prisoner of war.

== History ==
Royal Prussian Jagdstaffel 19 was founded on 25 October 1916. As the unit was not equipped until December, when it received Albatros D.IIs, it flew its first combat patrols only five days before Christmas, 1916. The new Jasta drew first blood on 6 April 1917, credit being given to Leutnant Walter Böning. The jasta achieved little over the next few months. By the end of 1917, it had 30 victories to its credit.

On 2 February 1918, Jasta 19 was detailed into Jagdgeschwader II along with Jasta 12, Jasta 13, and Jasta 15. Plagued by equipment problems in their new Siemens-Schuckert D.IIIs and wornout Fokker Dr.1s, on 26 May 1918 it found itself temporarily grounded due to lack of operational aircraft.

== Commanding officers (Staffelführer) ==
1. Obltn Franz Walz: 25 October 1916 – 28 November 1916
2. Obltn Erich Hahn: transferred in from Jasta 1 on 28 November 1916 – 4 September 1917 (KIA)
3. Eichorn (Acting) – September 1917
4. Ernst Hess: transferred in from Jasta 28 in September 1917 – 23 December 1917 (KIA)
5. Ltn d R Gerlt (Acting): 23 December 1917 – 2 February 1918
6. Ltn Konrad von Bülow-Bothkamp: transferred in from Jasta 14 on 2 February 1918 – 14 February 1918
7. Ltn d R Walter Göttsch: 14 February 1918 – 10 April 1918 (KIA)
8. Ltn d R Arthur Rahn (Acting): 10 April 1918 – 18 April 1918
9. Ltn d L Hans Martin Pippart: transferred in from Jasta 13 on 18 April 1918 – 20 May 1918
10. Ltn d R Gerlt (Acting): 20 May 1918 – 11 June 1918
11. Ltn d L Hans Pippart: 11 June 1918 – 11 August 1918 (KIA)
12. Ltn d R Gerlt (Acting): 11 August 1918 – 12 August 1918
13. Ltn d R Ulrich Neckel: transferred in from Jasta 2 on 12 August 1918 – transferred out on 1 September 1918
14. Ltn Olivier Freiherr von Beaulieu-Marconnay: transferred in from Jasta 15 on 1 September 1918 – 18 October 1918 (WIA)
15. Ltn d R Wilhelm Leusch (Acting): 18 October 1918 – 26 October 1918
16. Ltn d R Wilhelm Leusch: 26 October 1918 – 11 November 1918

== Aerodromes ==
1. Lagnicourt: 4 December 1916 – 11 December 1916
2. Saarburg, Germany: 11 December 1916 – 19 March 1917
3. Lothringen: 11 December 1916 – 19 March 1917
4. Le Thour, France: 19 March 1917 – Unknown date
5. Saint-Fergeux, France: Unknown date – 30 June 1917
6. Saint-Loup: 30 June 1917 – 2 February 1918.
7. Cuirieux: 2 February 1918 – 26 February 1918
8. Toulis: 26 February 1918 – 19 March 1918.
9. Guise: 19 March 1918 – Unknown date
10. Roupy
11. Guisecourt
12. Balatre: Unknown date – 12 June 1918
13. Mesnil-Bruntel: 12 June 1918 – 12 July 1918
14. Leffincourt: 12 July 1918 – 24 July 1918
15. Chery-les-Pouilly: 24 July 1918 – 10 August 1918
16. Foreste: 10 August 1918 – Late August 1918
17. Neuflize: Late August 1918 – 3 September 1918
18. Tichemont: 3 September 1918 – 5 September 1918
19. Stenay: 5 September 1918 – Unknown date
20. Carigan
21. Florenville
22. Trier

== Notable members ==
Two of the members of Jasta 19 were holders of the Pour le Mérite ("Blue Max"); both of them commanded the unit at some point. They were:

- Oliver von Beaulieu-Marconnay, winner of the Pour le Mérite and Iron Cross
- Ulrich Neckel, Pour le Mérite, Iron Cross

One of Germany's pioneer pilots checked into the Jasta already bearing the Military Order of Saint Henry:

- Erich Hahn went on to win the Royal House Order of Hohenzollern and Iron Cross

Four other aces in Jasta 19 won both the Hohenzollern Order and Iron Cross:

- Walter Böning
- Ernst Hess
- Franz Brandt
- Walter Göttsch

Other aces in the squadron were awarded the Iron Cross:

- Hans Pippart, the leading ace of Jasta 19
- Arthur Rahn

And there were aces who went unrewarded by medals, such as Rudolf Rienau and Hans Körner.

== Aircraft ==
Jasta 19 was founded with Albatros D.II fighters from its inception in December 1916. The Fokker Dr.I fighter came on line in August 1917; the unit was supplied with the triplane, although this re-equipment date is unknown. The Fokker D.VII fighter was supplied to combat units beginning in March or April 1918; the squadron also received them at an unknown date.

Jasta 19 joined Jagdgeschwader II in February 1918. Identifiable by serial number or pilot insignia, these are some of the aircraft known to have served with the squadron:

- One Albatros D.V
- Nine Fokker Dr.1s
- Three Fokker D.VIIs
- One Fokker E.V
- Two Siemens-Schuckert D.IIIs

However, during 1918, aircraft were in short supply despite JG II's hoarding of worn Fokker Dr.I triplanes. The withdrawal of newly issued Siemens-Schuckert D.IIIs led to shortages. In the worst instance, on 26 May 1918, Jasta 19 was temporarily grounded because it had no aircraft.

== Operations ==
From Armee-Flugpark I, the squadron moved to the 1st Armee Sector on 4 December 1916. They were moved to Armee-Abteilung A Sector a week afterwards.

On 19 March 1917, they were assigned to 7th Armee. It then moved back to the support of 1st Armee on 30 June.

On 2 February 1918, as part of the formation of Jagdgeschwader II, Jasta 19 returned to support of 7th Armee. On 19 March, the unit moved to the control of 18th Armee. On 12 June, they moved once more, to 2nd Armee support. A month later, it was 3rd Armee that needed the squadron. On 24 July, they moved to support of 9th Armee. It returned to the aid of 18th Armee on 10 August. By the end of August, the jasta had moved again, back to the aid of 1st Armee. On 3 September 1918, they went to the Armee-Abteilung C Front, but moved two days later to support 5th Armee for its final assignment.
