= Kurt Hetze =

- Born: Unknown
- Died: Unknown
- Military career
- Allegiance: Germany
- Branch: Flying service
- Rank: Leutnant
- Unit: Jagdstaffel 13
- Awards: Iron Cross

Leutnant Kurt Hetze was a World War I flying ace credited with five aerial victories.

Leutnant Kurt Hetze joined Royal Prussian Jagdstaffel 13 in June 1918. He scored his first aerial victory flying with them, downing a SPAD on 11 June. On 25 June 1918, he scored again, shooting down a Bristol F.2 Fighter from No. 48 Squadron RAF south of Albert at 1250 hours. Hetze received the Iron Cross First Class (which presupposes prior award of the Second Class Cross) on 21 July 1918.

On 15 August 1918, Hetze struck twice. At 0920 hours, he shot down a Spad over Crapeaumesnil. At 1925 hours, he shot down another Spad, over Liancourt. On 12 September 1918, in his last day in combat, Hetze claimed two Breguet 14 bombers; one of the claims would be confirmed for his fifth victory. On 13 September 1918, Kurt Hetze went upon an automobile trip to the front lines. A strafing Spad put a bullet through his lungs. Hetze was out of action for the remainder of the war.
