= Joseph Cruess Callaghan =

Irish flying ace (1893–1918)

- Born: 4 March 1893; Kingstown, Ireland
- Died: 2 July 1918 (aged 25)
- Burial place: Contay British Cemetery, Contay, France
- Relatives: Carmencita Hederman (niece)
- Military career
- Allegiance: United Kingdom
- Branch: British Army; Royal Air Force
- Service years: 1915–1918
- Rank: Major
- Nickname: "The Mad Major"
- Units: Royal Munster Fusiliers; No. 18 Squadron RFC
- Commands: No. 87 Squadron RAF; No. 2 Auxiliary School of Aerial Gunnery
- Conflicts: World War I; Western Front
- Awards: Military Cross

Joseph Cruess Callaghan, MC (4 March 1893 – 2 July 1918) was an Irish flying ace of the First World War, credited with five aerial victories.

== Early life and background ==
Joseph Cruess Callaghan was the eldest of six children of Joseph Patrick Callaghan (of Blackrock, Dublin) and Croasdella Elizabeth Mary (née Bolger; daughter of James Bolger and Croasdella Elizabeth Cruess); he was educated at Jesuit schools such as Belvedere College (Dublin) and Stonyhurst College (Lancashire, England).

== First World War ==
Callaghan was living in Texas when the First World War broke out; he returned home to be commissioned as a second lieutenant in the 7th (Service) Battalion, Royal Munster Fusiliers in January 1915. He transferred to the Royal Flying Corps on 1 September, and trained as a pilot, being granted Royal Aero Club Aviators Certificate No. 1829 on 4 October, after soloing a Maurice Farman biplane at the Military School, Norwich, and was appointed a flying officer on 25 January 1916.

Callaghan was assigned to No. 18 Squadron RFC in April 1916; He piloted an F.E.2b to victory on 26 April, getting credit for destroying a Fokker Eindecker (though the Germans recorded no casualties). He crash-landed near Château de la Haie because of damaged controls, to discover his observer dead, shot through the head. He was wounded in action on 31 July.

Callaghan was appointed a flight commander with the temporary rank of captain and, 4 November 1916, was transferred to the Regular Army. From January 1917 he served as Commandant of No. 2 Auxiliary School of Aerial Gunnery, Turnberry, with the temporary rank of major (graded as a squadron commander), where his aerial stunts earned him the nickname "The Mad Major."

For his service in France Callaghan was awarded the Military Cross, which was gazetted on 13 February 1917. His citation read:

Second Lieutenant (temporary Captain) Joseph Cruess Callaghan, Royal Munster Fusiliers and Royal Flying Corps. For conspicuous gallantry in action. He displayed marked courage and skill on several occasions in carrying out night bombing operations. On one occasion he extinguished a hostile searchlight.

In April 1918, Callaghan returned to combat as commanding officer of No. 87 Squadron RAF, flying the Sopwith Dolphin, and gained four more aerial victories between 29 May and 28 June to become a flying ace.

On 2 July 1918, Callaghan single-handedly attacked a group of as many as 25 German fighters. He was killed when his Dolphin was shot down in flames by Leutnant Franz Büchner of Jasta 13. He is buried in the Contay British Cemetery, Contay, France.

Two of Callaghan's younger brothers also died during the war. Captain Stanislaus Cruess Callaghan was killed in a flying accident while serving in Royal Flying Corps Canada on 27 June 1917, while Second Lieutenant Owen (or Eugene) Cruess Callaghan was killed in action on 26 August 1916 while serving in No. 19 Squadron RFC in France.

== List of aerial victories ==
Combat record
No.	Date/Time	Aircraft/ Serial No.	Opponent	Result	Location	Notes
No. 18 Squadron RFC
1	26 April 1916	F.E.2b (5232)	Fokker E	Destroyed		Observer: Lieutenant J. Mitchell †
No. 87 Squadron RAF
2	29 May 1918 at 1940	Sopwith Dolphin (D3671)	Rumpler C	Out of control	Villers-Bretonneux	
3	1 June 1918 at 1415	Sopwith Dolphin (D3671)	LVG C	Destroyed	West of Bertangles	
4	28 June 1918 at 0815–0915	Sopwith Dolphin (D3671)	Albatros D.V	Destroyed	Bapaume—Quéant	
5	28 June 1918 at 0815–0915	Sopwith Dolphin (D3671)	Albatros D.V	Out of control	Bapaume	
