= Jasta 14 =

Jasta 14 may refer to:

- Jasta 14, an abbreviated form of Jagdstaffel 14, a World War I German fighter squadron
- Jasta 14 (band), a hardcore band from Connecticut
