= Arthur Rahn =

German World War I flying ace (1897-1962)

Arthur R. Rahn
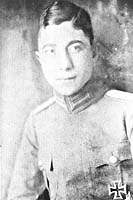
- Arthur Rahn, taken around June 1918
- Born: 18 July 1897; Schweingrube, Kingdom of Prussia, German Empire
- Died: 27 April 1962 (aged 64); Redford, Michigan, United States
- Military career
- Allegiance: Germany
- Branch: Luftstreitkräfte
- Rank: Leutnant
- Units: Jagdstaffel 18, Jagdstaffel 19, Jagdstaffel 15
- Awards: House Order of Hohenzollern; Iron Cross

Leutnant Arthur Rahn (18 July 1897 – 27 April 1962) was a German World War I flying ace credited with six aerial victories. He served as a fighter pilot for about two years before being wounded in action on 27 July 1918. Exiting hospital after war's end, he married in 1919. In 1928, the Rahns emigrated to the United States and became naturalized citizens.

== Biography ==
=== Early life and service ===
Arthur R. Rahn was born on 18 July 1897 in Schweingrube, the Kingdom of Prussia, in the German Empire to Anna Tgahrt and Rudolf Rahn. Arthur Rahn was baptized into the Mennonite faith at the Danzig Mennonite Church in Danzig, Poland on 16 March 1913.

He volunteered for service in the Prussian Army on 6 January 1915. His initial military service is unknown, but on 16 May 1916 he began aviation school at Coslin. After training, he was then posted to Fliegerersatz-Abteilung (Replacement Detachment) 7.

=== Aerial service ===
On 21 December 1916, Rahn was forwarded to a fighter squadron, Jagdstaffel 19. On 5 February, he broke his nose in a crash from 75 meters altitude, earning a short hospitalization. He scored his first aerial victories when he shot down two enemy observation balloons over Reims, France on 30 April 1917. On 5 May 1917, he destroyed a Caudron at Cormacy.

On 20 October 1917, Rahn transferred fighter squadrons to Jagdstaffel 18. On 18 March 1918, he transferred again, to Jagdstaffel 15. He was on an evening sortie southeast of Amiens, France ten days later; at 1730 hours, he downed a Breguet 14. The following day, 29 March 1918, he was posted back to Jasta 19 in Rudolf Berthold's Jagdgeschwader II in an effort to give the squadron some offensive punch. On 1 April 1918, he shot down another Brequet 14, this one over Montdidier, for his fifth confirmed victory.

He temporarily took squadron command of Jasta 19 from 11—19 April 1918 after its commander, Walter Göttsch, died in action. He relinquished the command to Hans Martin Pippart. On 4 May 1918, he scored his last victory above Piennes; the victim was an Escadrille 77 SPAD that he set aflame. On 7 June 1918, Rahn filed a combat claim for a Royal Aircraft Factory SE.5a, but it went unconfirmed.

Leutnant Arthur Rahn was awarded the Iron Cross for his feats.

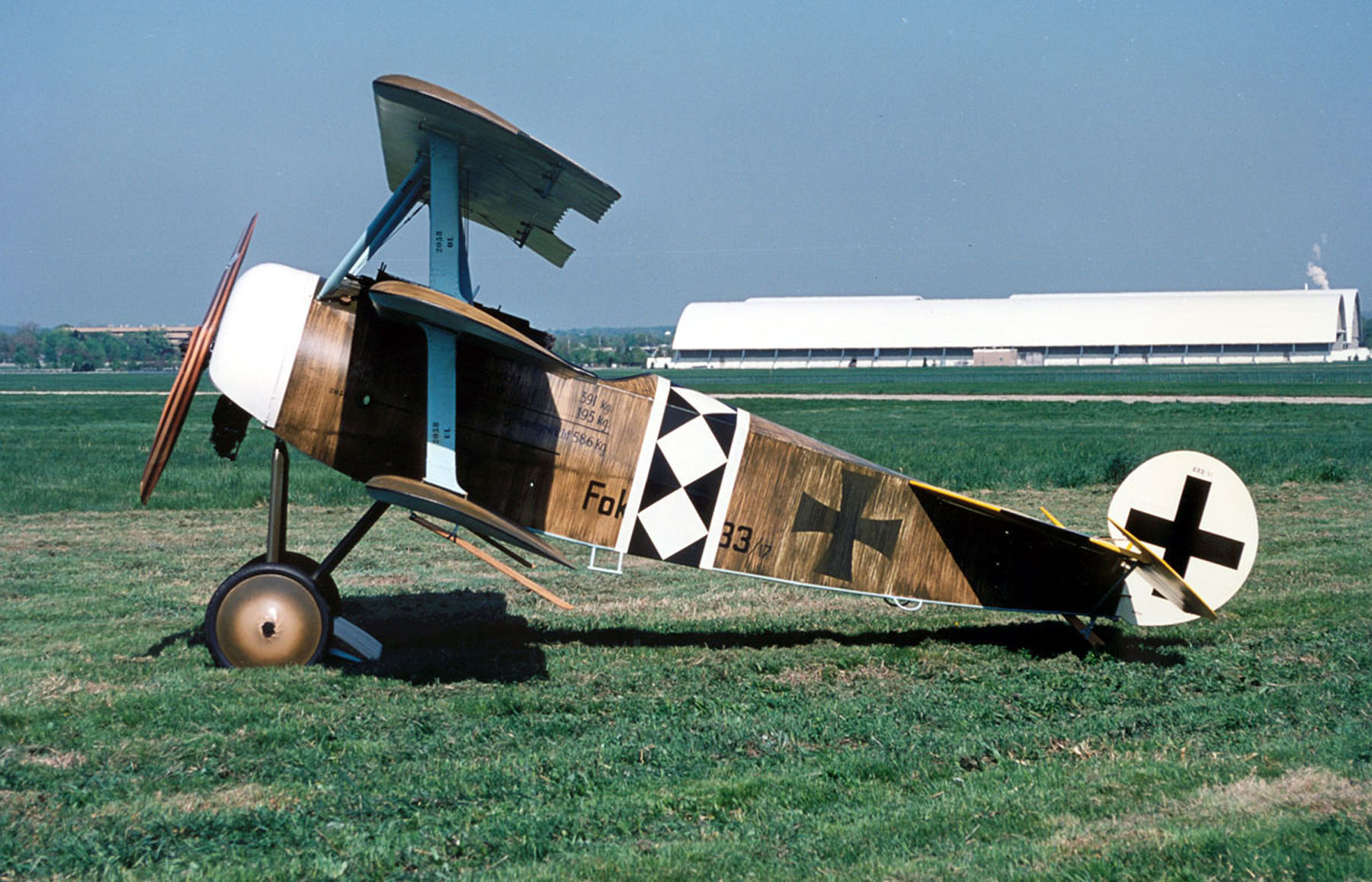
Arthur Rahn's Fokker Dr.I, serial 433/17.

In his latter assignment with Jasta 19, Rahn flew a distinctively painted Fokker Triplane, serial number 433/17 (as seen at right). Its fuselage had a white and a black band about it, with a stack of lighter diamonds upon the latter.

Rahn was shot in the shin and hand on 17 July 1918, but managed to fly back to base at Leffincourt. He was hospitalized and never returned to combat. Two weeks after his wounding, he received the House Order of Hohenzollern.

=== Postwar life ===
On 5 December 1919, Rahn married Marie Driedger in Poppau, Danzig. They would have five children.

Rahn and family emigrated to New York City, arriving on 25 November 1928. The Rahns became naturalized American citizens on 18 July 1934.

Arthur R. Rahn died on 27 April 1962 in Redford, Michigan, United States. He is buried in Section 260, Grave 3 in the Garden of Hope section of Glen Eden Lutheran Memorial Park, Livonia, Michigan, USA.
