= Jagdstaffel 13 =

Jasta 13
- Active: 1916–1918
- Country: German Empire
- Branch: Luftstreitkräfte
- Type: Fighter squadron
- Engagements: World War I

Royal Prussian Jagdstaffel 13 was a World War I "hunting group" (i.e., fighter squadron) of the Luftstreitkräfte, the air arm of the Imperial German Army during World War I. The unit would score 108 aerial victories during the war, at the expense of twelve killed in action, one killed in a flying accident, two wounded in action, and two taken prisoner of war.

== History ==
Jasta 13 was formed on 16 September 1916. Its founding personnel came from the Fokkerstaffel attached to FFA 9, and from other aviation units in the area of Armee-Abteilung C. They were operational by 15 October 1916. However, Jasta 13 did not score its first victory until 22 January 1917. In Spring 1917, the squadron was assigned to support of 7th Armee.

By the end of August 1917, the unit had been credited with about ten victories. In September, it joined Jagdgruppe von Braun, along with Jasta 14, Jasta 16, Jasta 21, Jasta 22, Jasta 23, Jasta 32, and Jasta 34. Also in September, Franz Buchner reported for duty with his first aerial victory awaiting approval; his eventual destruction of 39 more opponents would be a major part of the squadron's victory tally. He would soon be joined by a prewar veteran aviator, Hans Martin Pippart, who would also play a prominent role in the jasta. By the time Jasta 13 joined Jagdgeschwader II on 2 February 1918, it had 22 victories to its credit.

After this extensive campaigning within France, including the German spring offensive 1918, the squadron became a sort of "fire brigade" on loan to various Armees and rotated frequently among airfields. It retreated with the German forces, eventually being stationed in Luxembourg, and finally back in Germany. They demobilized at FEA 14, Halle-an-der-Saale, Germany by the end of November 1918.

== Commanding officers (Staffelführer) ==
1. Oberleutnant Erhard Egerer: ca 16 September 1916 – 26 December 1916
2. Eduard Dostler (later to be known as: Eduard Ritter von Dostler): 27 December 1916 – ca 19 February 1917
3. Leutnant de Reserves Wolfgang Güttler: ca 20 February 1917 – 29 October 1917 (KIA)
4. Oberleutnant Alex Thomas: 21 February 1918 – 1 May 1918
5. Leutnant de Reserves Wilhelm Schwartz: 1 May 1918 – 15 June 1918 (WIA)
6. Leutnant Franz Büchner: 15 June 1918 – 11 November 1918

== Duty stations (airfields) ==
1. Mars-la-Tour, France
2. La Selve, Aisne, France
3. Le Clos Ferme, Boncourt
4. Marle, Aisne, France
5. Cambrai, France
6. Reneuil Ferme: 13 February 1918
7. Autremencourt, France
8. Guise, France
9. Roupy, France
10. Guisecourt
11. Balâtre, France
12. Boneuil Ferme
13. Le Mesnil, Nesle
14. Mesnil-Bruntel, France
15. Leffincourt, France
16. Chéry-lès-Pouilly, France
17. Foreste, France
18. Fontaine-Notre-Dame, France (Note: Source (Jagdgeschwader Nr II: Geschwader Berthold) speaks of the "Fonfomme-Fontaine-Notre Dame road". It is likely this is an error, and Fonsommes is meant, next to Fontaine-Notre-Dame in the Aisne.)
19. Neuflize, France
20. Tichémont
21. Stenay, France
22. Carignan, Ardennes, France
23. Florenville, Luxembourg
24. Trier, Germany

== Personnel ==
A number of notable aces flew with Jasta 13. Indeed, four of the Staffelnführer were renowned aces. Eduard Ritter von Dostler won a Pour le Mérite and a knighthood; Guttler, Thomas, and Buchner were all decorated for their services. The squadron also contained other decorated aces who did not succeed to its command, in Kurt Hetze, Reinhold Jörke and balloon buster Hans Martin Pippart.

== Aircraft ==
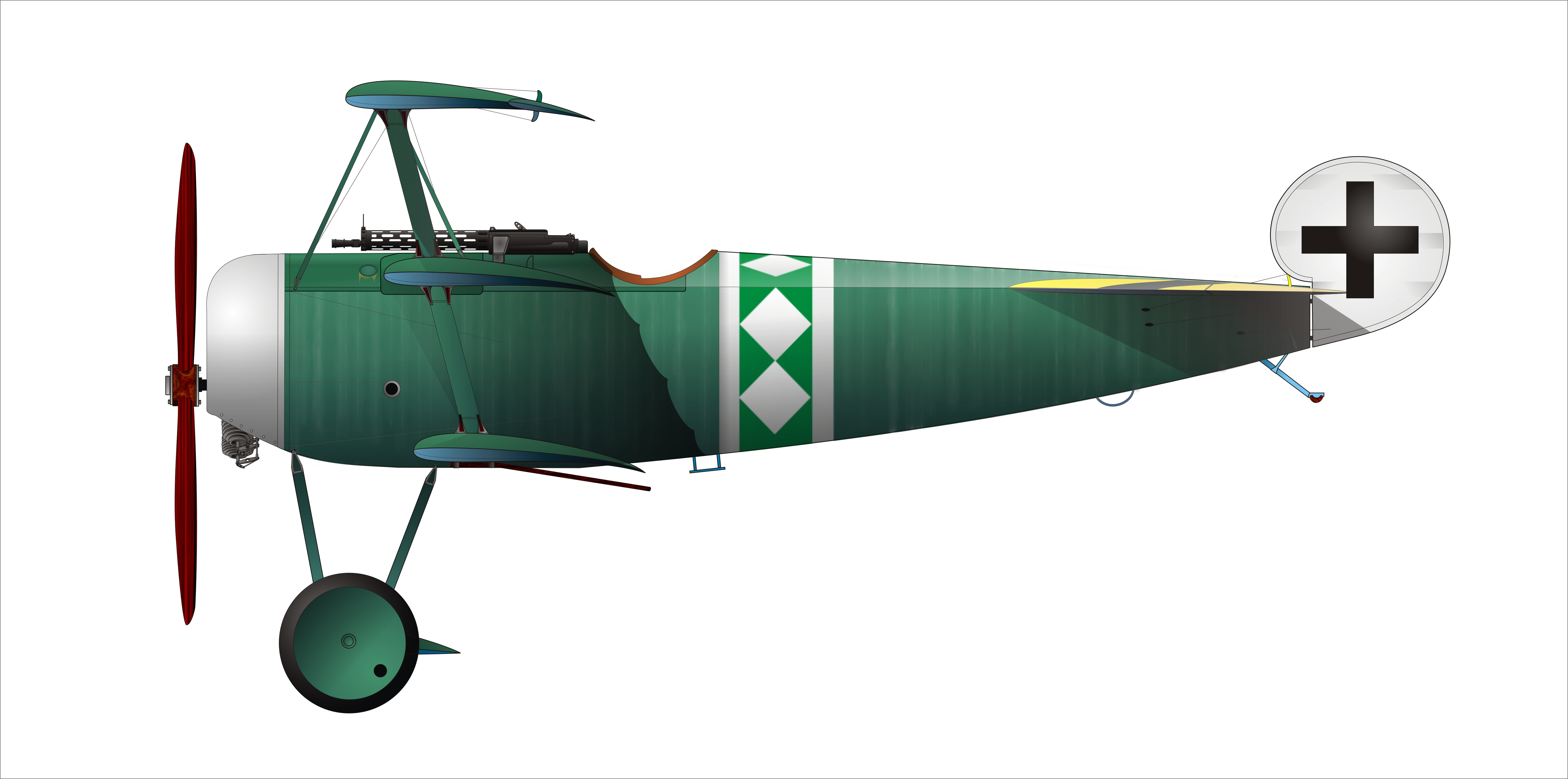
The Fokker Dr.1 triplane of Hans Martin Pippart.

Early aircraft assigned to Jasta 13 are unknown, though its foundation from a Fokkerstaffel strongly hint of Fokker Eindekkers. It later operated the Fokker Dr.I triplane, and ended the war using mostly Fokker D.VIIs.

Jasta 13 joined Jagdgeschwader II in February 1918. Identifiable by serial number or pilot insignia, these are some of the aircraft known to have served with the squadron:

- One Albatros D.V
- Three Fokker Dr.Is
- Four Fokker D.VIIs

== Operations ==
In Spring 1917, the squadron was assigned to support of 7th Armee. In September, it joined Jagdgruppe von Braun, along with Jasta 14, Jasta 16, Jasta 21, Jasta 22, Jasta 23, Jasta 32, and Jasta 34.

In February 1918, it was assigned to Jagdgruppe II at Marle, along with Jasta 12, Jasta 15, and Jasta 19. When the German March offensive began, Jasta 13 was shifted to 18th Armee, and lived an itinerant existence, being moved among various airfields. By June, it had been assigned to 1st Armee at Mesnil. The squadron then became an itinerant unit, supporting at various times 2nd Armee, 3rd Armee, 1st Armee again, and 5th Armee. The squadron moved to its last base at Trier the day before the armistice.
