= Martin Zander =

German World War I flying ace (1882–1925)

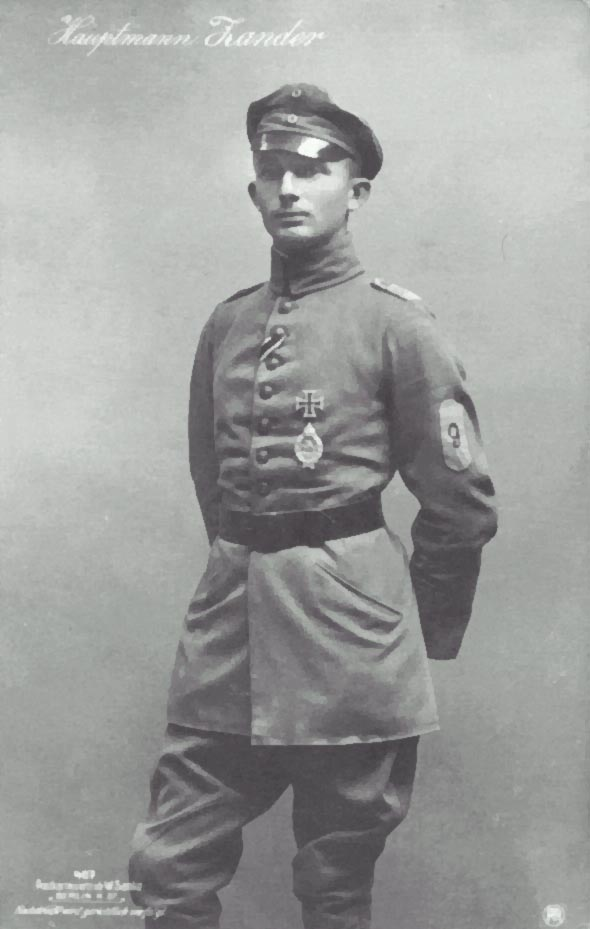
- Born: 12 November 1882; Posen, Germany
- Died: 6 September 1925 (aged 42); Heroldsbach, Germany
- Military career
- Allegiance: Germany
- Branch: Aviation
- Rank: Hauptmann (Captain)
- Unit: Flieger-Abteilung (Artillerie) 9
- Commands: Kampfeinsitzerkommando Nord; Jagdstaffel 1
- Awards: Iron Cross

Hauptmann Martin Zander (1882–1925) was a World War I flying ace credited with five aerial victories. He was appointed to command one of the original German fighter squadrons, Jagdstaffel 1, before becoming an instructor.

== Biography ==
Early in World War I, Martin Zander flew in an artillery cooperation unit, Flieger-Abteilung (Artillerie) 9. He was transferred from there to take up command of a fighter detachment, Kampfeinsitzerkommando Nord. He shot down two enemy airplanes while flying with this detachment. Then, as the German military concentrated their fighters into squadrons, Zander was posted to lead Jagdstaffel 1. His tenure as commanding officer began with the new squadron's founding, on 22 August 1916. He would shoot down three British airplanes to become an ace while leading this squadron—one victory each in August, September, and October 1916. On 10 November 1916, he was transferred from combat duty to become an instructor, and saw no further battle assignments.

Martin Zander died in 1925.

== See also ==
- Aerial victory standards of World War I
