= Hans Kummetz =

German flying ace

- Born: 29 April 1890; Illowo, German Empire
- Died: 11 January 1918 (aged 27); Conegliano, Kingdom of Italy
- Military career
- Allegiance: German Empire
- Branch: Luftstreitkräfte
- Rank: Oberleutnant
- Unit: Jagdstaffel 1
- Awards: Iron Cross

Oberleutnant Hans Kummetz (29 April 1890 – 11 January 1918) was a World War I flying ace credited with seven aerial victories.

== Biography ==
Hans Kummetz was born on 29 April 1890 in Illowo, then part of the German Empire but now in Poland. His early military career is unknown, including any pilot training or early aviation service. However, he became the Staffelführer of one of the German air service's original fighter squadrons, Jagdstaffel 1 soon after its foundation, on 18 November 1916. The newly formed unit went into action in France on the Western Front.

Kummetz would shoot down five enemy aircraft and a French observation balloon, beginning 4 March 1917, with his sixth victory coming on 17 August 1917. He was then posted to Jastaschule II (Fighter School 2) on 12 September 1917. It is unknown whether he was an instructor or a pupil, with the former being probable. On 12 November, he returned to Jasta 1, which had been repositioned in Italy. On 20 November 1917, he reassumed command, which he would hold until his death. He shot down a Sopwith Camel over Villamata for his seventh victory.

On 1 January 1918, Kummetz claimed another Sopwith Camel, but the claim was unconfirmed. On 11 January 1918, Hans Kummetz clashed with Camels from No. 66 Squadron RAF over Conegliano, Italy. He was downed and killed in action; his most likely killer was Lieutenant H. T. Thompson. During his military career, he had won both the Second and First Class Iron Cross
