= Bréguet 17 =

French biplane fighter aircraft

17
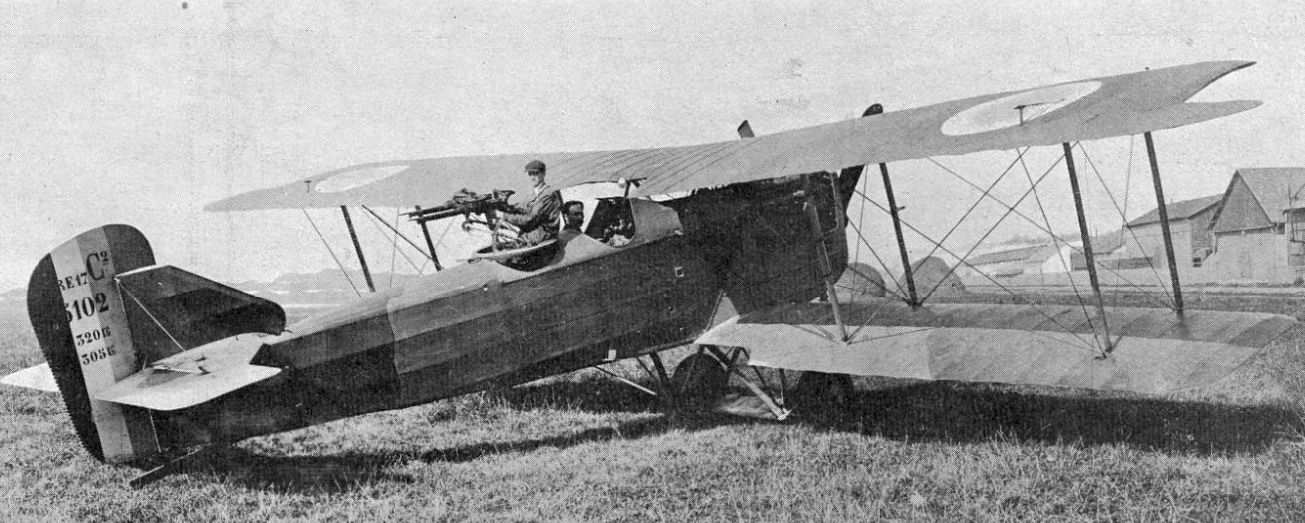
- Bréguet 17 C.2 in 1922.

General information
- Type: Heavy fighter
- Manufacturer: Bréguet
- Primary user: French Army
- Number built: ca. 100

History
- First flight: 1918

The Bréguet 17 was a two-seat biplane fighter developed in France towards the end of World War I and operated by that country during the 1920s.

== Design and development ==
The Bréguet 17 was a derivative of the highly successful 14 bomber, but somewhat scaled down and carrying a more powerful engine and heavier machine gun armament in place of a bomb load. The French Army was impressed enough to place orders for 1,000 of these aircraft during 1918, to be delivered the following year. The end of World War I ended these plans, but some limited production did take place into the early 1920s.

== Operational history ==
The type was operated as the Bre.17C.2 with several escadrilles as a supplement to existing aircraft, but never formed the basis for any one unit on its own. A single example was converted into a prototype night fighter, but no production ensued.

== Variants ==
Bre.17C.2
Main production version.
Bre.17
Night fighter prototype.

== Operators ==
France

- French Army

== Specifications ==
General characteristics

- Crew: two, pilot and gunner
- Length: 8.10 m (26 ft 7 in)
- Wingspan: 14.28 m (46 ft 10 in)
- Height: 3.42 m (11 ft 3 in)
- Wing area: 43.3 m^{2} (466 sq ft)
- Gross weight: 1,840 kg (4,056 lb)
- Powerplant: 1 × Renault 12K1 , 336 kW (450 hp)

Performance

- Maximum speed: 218 km/h (135 mph, 117 kn)
- Service ceiling: 7,500 m (24,610 ft)
- Rate of climb: 5.8 m/s (1,140 ft/min)

Armament

- 2 × fixed, forward-firing 7.7 mm (.303 in) Vickers machine guns
- 2 × trainable, rearward-firing 7.7 mm (.303 in) Lewis Guns in ring mount in rear cockpit
- 1 × trainable, downward-firing 7.7 mm (.303 in) Lewis gun through trap door in rear cockpit
