= Erich Hahn =

German WW1 fighter ace

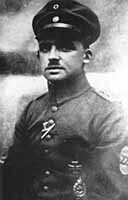
- Born: 18 October 1891; Leipzig, Kingdom of Saxony
- Died: 4 September 1917 (aged 25); Beine, France
- Military career
- Allegiance: German Empire
- Branch: Infantry; aviation
- Rank: Oberleutnant
- Units: Flieger-Abteilung (Artillerie) (Flier Detachment (Artillery)) 221; Feldflieger Abteilung (Field Flier Detachment) 64; Kampfeinsitzerkommando (Combat Single-Seater Command) Bertincourt; Jagdstaffel 1 (Fighter Squadron 1); Jagdstaffel 19 (Fighter Squadron 19)
- Commands: Jagdstaffel 19
- Awards: Military Order of Saint Henry; Royal House Order of Hohenzollern; Iron Cross First and Second Class

Oberleutnant Erich Hahn (18 October 1891 – 4 September 1917) was a World War I flying ace credited with six aerial victories.

== Biography ==
Erich Hahn was born on 18 October 1891 in Leipzig, the Kingdom of Saxony, in the German Empire.

He joined Saxony's Infantry Regiment Nr. 2 just before World War I. In 1913, he learned to fly at Anthony Fokker's flying school. As one of the very few experienced pilots about, he was serving in Flieger-Abteilung (Flier Detachment) 64 when the war began. He then moved on to service in Flieger-Abteilung (Flier Detachment) 23 and then to artillery direction with Flieger-Abteilung (Artillerie) (Flier Detachment (Artillery)) 221.

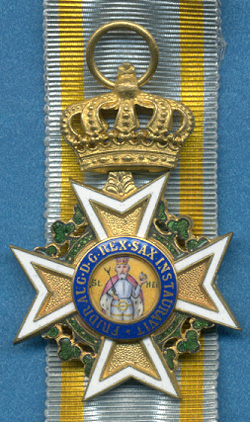
Knight's Cross of the Military Order of Saint Henry

On 10 August 1916, he transferred to fighter aviation with his assignment to Kampfeinsitzerkommando (Combat Single-Seater Command) Bertincourtt. When Jagdstaffel 1 (Fighter Squadron 1) was founded as one of the original dedicated German fighter squadrons later in August, Hahn joined them. On 10 November, he both succeeded to acting squadron commander and scored his first aerial victory. On 29 November 1916, he transferred to command of Jagdstaffel 19 (Fighter Squadron 19). Having already won both classes of the Iron Cross, he accepted the Knight's Cross of the Military Order of Saint Henry on 29 December 1916. Hahn was the first fighter pilot to receive the Saint Henry.

He did not score again until April, when he downed three enemy airplanes and two observation balloons. Notable among those wins was his fourth victory, when he downed French ace René Doumer. On 1 May, Erich Hahn was awarded the Royal House Order of Hohenzollern.

After these six confirmed victories, Hahn led his squadron until 1935 hours on 4 September 1917. The French ace Lieutenant Georges Madon then shot him down over Beine, France, and killed him.
