= Franz Büchner =

German flying ace (1898–1920)

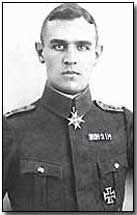
- Born: 2 January 1898; Leipzig, Kingdom of Saxony, Germany
- Died: 18 March 1920 (aged 22); Near Leipzig
- Relatives: brother Max KIA; brother Felix
- Military career
- Allegiance: Germany
- Branch: (Kingdom of Saxony) Saxon Army; Luftstreitkräfte
- Service years: 1914–1920
- Rank: Leutnant
- Units: 106th Infantry Regiment; Fliegerabteilung 270; Jagdstaffel 9
- Commands: Jagdstaffel 13
- Conflicts: World War I
- Awards: Pour le Merite; Royal House Order of Hohenzollern; Iron Cross 1st and 2nd Class; Military Order of St. Henry; Albert Order

Franz Büchner PlM (2 January 1898 – 18 March 1920) was one of the most successful German fighter aces of the First World War, shooting down 40 enemy aircraft. He began his military career as a 16-year-old infantryman. His doughty exploits earned him a battlefield commission just after his 18th birthday, in early 1916. After being wounded and invalided from the infantry, he joined the Imperial German Air Service. Once he progressed to become a fighter pilot flying a Fokker D.VII, he initially struggled to gain his first aerial victories. Something clicked after his fifth victory, and he began to regularly shoot down enemy airplanes, scoring 35 victories between 1 July and 22 October 1918. Most notably, he shot down four SPADs on 26 September. He survived the war, but died in action in 1920 while combating communist revolutionaries near Leipzig.

== Early career ==
Büchner was born in Leipzig in the Kingdom of Saxony, the son of a businessman. He volunteered for the army in September 1914, aged 16, after his elder brother Max was killed in action. Franz Büchner served in the 106th (7th Royal Saxon) Infantry "King George" (Kgl. Sächsisches 7. Infanterie-Regiment König Georg Nr. 106). After surviving a case of typhoid fever, he fought on both the Eastern and Western fronts. Impressed by his valorous performance, his superiors returned him to school to finish his education. He was subsequently commissioned in 1916 shortly after his 18th birthday He was wounded in combat in France on 3 April 1916 After his recovery, he transferred to the German Army Air Service, or Luftstreitkräfte, and was assigned as an observation pilot with Fliegerabteilung 270.

== Service as a fighter pilot ==
In March 1917 Büchner became a fighter pilot, joining the Prussian Jagdstaffel 9, where he scored his first and only victory with them on 17 August. Upon his transfer to Jagdstaffel 13, he found his niche under Rudolph Berthold, one of Germany's most dedicated soldiers. However, it was several months before he scored again, on 15 October.

With the introduction of the Fokker D.VII in 1918, Büchner came into his own; he flew at least three different machines during his career, scoring three victories in June and becoming Commanding Officer of the squadron on 15 June. It was after his fifth victory that he landed and announced to his colleagues that he had now learned how to win in aerial combat. It was a prescient statement.

On 2 July, he shot down and killed "The Mad Major", Irish ace Major Joseph Callaghan, Commander of No. 87 Squadron RAF, who was flying a Sopwith Dolphin in a solo attack on Jagdstaffel 13. Five days later, he followed up with Canadian ace Lieutenant Merrill Taylor killed in a Sopwith Camel of No. 209 Squadron RAF.

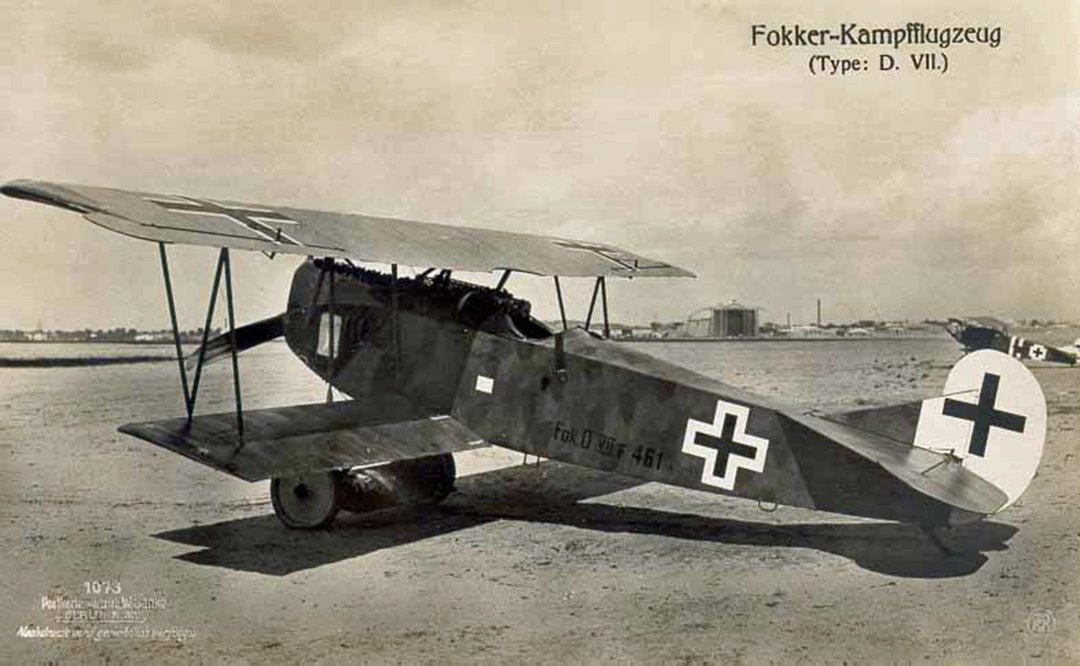
A Fokker D.VII. Büchner's had a golden lion's head on its royal blue fuselage.

On 29 July 1918 Büchner shot an American Sopwith Camel down in flames with just 14 rounds. His wingman, Leutnant Werner Niethammer, cited this combat as an illustration of Büchner's skill as a marksman; according to Niethammer's account, Büchner had no sooner spotted the American than he had set the enemy aircraft on fire. This would be the last of his seven victories in July. It was at this juncture that Büchner's brother Felix joined Jagdstaffel 13.

On 10 August, Büchner's career nearly ended. While attacking and shooting down a two seater in bad flying weather, his plane's fuel tank was hit. Drenched in gasoline, he landed in no man's land and tagged along with two retreating German machine gunners The incident does not seem to have slowed him down. It was the second of his eight victories in August.

In September Büchner scored 17 victories. On 10 October, Büchner survived a mid-air collision with a squadronmate; both of them parachuted to safety. He brought his tally to 40 victories by 22 October 1918. Three days later, he was belatedly awarded the Pour le Mérite on 25 October 1918, one of the last awards before the Kaiser's abdication. However, by that date, Büchner was in Berlin for trials of new fighter aircraft.

== Post war service ==
By March 1919, Büchner's Fokker D.VII was in the hands of the American 138th Aero Squadron. Its lion's head insignia was cut from its fuselage as a souvenir, but was later lost in the Second World War.

In the turbulent postwar period the 22-year-old Büchner flew against communist revolutionaries but was shot down and killed by members of the Spartacus League during a reconnaissance flight near his hometown of Leipzig on 18 March 1920, three days after Rudolf Berthold was murdered in Harburg.

== Decorations and awards ==
Besides the Pour le Mérite, Prussia's highest military honor, Büchner also received the highest military honor of his home state, Saxony's Military Order of St. Henry (Militär-St. Heinrichs-Orden), on 7 October 1918. Büchner's other decorations include the Prussian Iron Cross 1st and 2nd Class, the Knight's Cross with Swords of Prussia's Royal House Order of Hohenzollern, the Knight's Cross with Swords of Saxony's Merit Order, and the Knight's Cross with Swords of Saxony's Albert Order.
