= Glen Eden Lutheran Memorial Park =

Cemetery in Michigan

Coordinates: 42°26′11.6″N 83°23′58.8″W

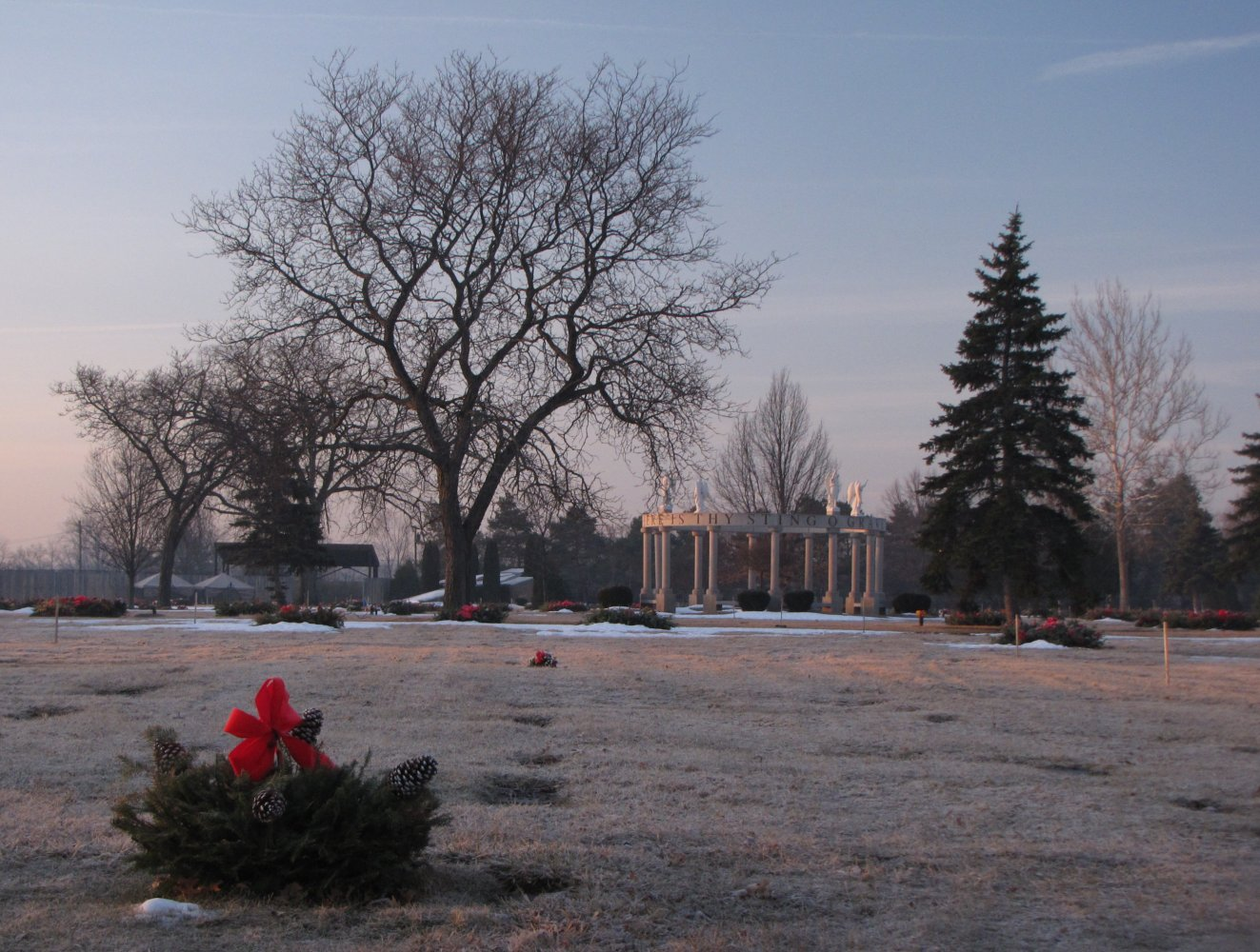
- Interactive map of Glen Eden Lutheran Memorial Park

Details
- Established: 1929
- Location: Livonia, Michigan

Glen Eden Lutheran Memorial Park is a non-profit cemetery in Livonia, Michigan and Macomb Township. Glen Eden began serving the community when a small group of investors started the cemetery in 1929. In 1932, ownership and operation of the cemetery was transferred to four Lutheran churches.

The St. Gabriel Mausoleum was designed by the architectural firm of J. Stuart Todd of Dallas, Texas, an international firm with over 1,500 completed cemetery projects to their credit. McCarthy & Smith, Inc. of Farmington Hills, Michigan providers of construction services to cemeteries throughout southeast Michigan for over thirty years provided construction services on the mausoleum. Both of these firms were also involved in the development of the first new cemetery in Macomb County in over three decades Glen Eden East, in Macomb Township as well.

Surrounding the Chapel are four traditional burial gardens, beautifully landscaped and distinguished by specific themes that reflect life and individual character. The Garden of Faith, Garden of Hope and Garden of Resurrection feature individual and family lots while two specially dedicated gardens honor community members who have served during their lives; The Pastors Point Garden reserved for Lutheran pastors and their spouses, and The Garden of Valor which provides a special setting of honor for veterans and their spouses.

In June 1962, Lutheran War Veterans Auxiliary, Gold Star Mothers and Blue Star Mothers, as a special place to pay tribute to veterans, dedicated Glen Eden's Veteran's Monument, now the focus of the Garden of Valor. To commemorate veterans who are buried elsewhere, a cenotaph memorial surrounds the massive flagpole in the Memorial Plaza Boulevard featuring a solid bronze bas-relief sculpture depicting those who have served their country.

== Some prominent burials ==
- Sidney Abel, Hall of Fame professional hockey player
- Ford R. Bryan, author/historian and 4th cousin of Henry Ford I
- George "Hully" Gee, professional hockey player
- Arthur Rahn, WWI German fighter ace
