= Paul Rothe =

Richard Paul Rothe
- Born: 20 July 1890; Löbau, Kingdom of Saxony, German Empire
- Died: 1 December 1961 (aged 71); Leipzig, East Germany
- Burial place: Germany
- Military career
- Allegiance: Germany
- Branch: Aviation
- Rank: Vizefeldwebel
- Units: Flieger-Abteilung 62 (Flight Detachment 62), Jagdstaffel 14 (Fighter Squadron 14)
- Awards: Iron Cross

Vizefeldwebel Richard Paul Rothe was a German World War I flying ace credited with five aerial victories.

== Biography ==
See also Aerial victory standards of World War I

Richard Paul Rothe (preferred name Paul Rothe) was born in Löbau, Saxony, Germany on 20 July 1890.

He became a pilot in 1916, being kept on as an instructor until October. He was then posted to Flieger-Abteilung 62 (Flight Detachment 62), which was operating on the Eastern Front. He was sent to fighter training in March 1917. Once graduated, he was posted to Jagdstaffel 14 (Fighter Squadron 14). On 23 August 1917, he shot down an observation balloon. He downed enemy airplanes on 26 February and 22 May 1918, and was awarded both classes of the Iron Cross. Then, on 29 October 1918, he shot down two more observation balloons to become an ace.

Paul Rothe died in Leipzig on 1 December 1961.
