= Carmencita Hederman =

Irish politician (1939–2025)

- Hederman in 1987

Senator
- In office 1 November 1989 – 17 February 1993
- Constituency: Dublin University

Lord Mayor of Dublin
- In office 3 June 1987 – 5 June 1988
- Preceded by: Bertie Ahern
- Succeeded by: Ben Briscoe

Personal details
- Born: Carmencita Cruess Callaghan; 23 October 1939 Dublin, Ireland
- Died: 31 May 2025 (aged 85) Dublin, Ireland
- Party: Independent
- Spouse: William Hederman (m. 1962; died 2016)
- Children: 5
- Relatives: Joseph Cruess Callaghan (uncle)
- Education: Trinity College Dublin

Carmencita Hederman (née Cruess Callaghan; 23 October 1939 – 31 May 2025) was an Irish independent politician who served as Lord Mayor of Dublin from 1987 to 1988, and a senator for the Dublin University constituency from 1989 to 1993.

== Political career ==
In the late 1960s, Hederman was a co-founder of the Upper Leeson Street Area Resident's Association, which was formed to oppose the rezoning of houses on Leeson Street and Leeson Park for office use. Locals nicknamed the group "the Leeson Street storm troopers". She became known for her monitoring of planning permissions and developments within Dublin. She also campaigned for safer cycling in the city.

Hederman was a member of Dublin City Council from 1974 to 1999 as an independent and topped the polls in 1974. She was Lord Mayor of Dublin from 1987 to 1988 during the Dublin Millennium celebrations, the first woman to hold the office in 30 years.

She was elected to the Seanad in 1989 for the Dublin University constituency. She did not stand for re-election to the Seanad in 1993.

== Personal life and death ==
Carmencita Callaghan was the daughter of George Cruess Callaghan and sister of Frank Cruess Callaghan, both successful businessmen. Her uncle was Joseph Cruess Callaghan. The family lived in Blackrock. She studied history of art and languages in Trinity College Dublin.

She married William Hederman in 1962 and they had five children. A third-generation doctor and surgeon, William Hederman was president of the Royal College of Surgeons in Ireland from 1990 to 1992 and later president of the Vascular Society of Great Britain and Ireland. Her daughter, Wendy Hederman, was also a councillor on Dublin City Council, representing the Progressive Democrats.

Hederman died in Dublin on 31 May 2025, at the age of 85. She left almost €10 million in her will.

Civic offices
Preceded by Bertie Ahern	Lord Mayor of Dublin; 1987–1988	Succeeded by Ben Briscoe
