= Jagdstaffel 76 =

Jasta 76
- Active: 1917–1918
- Country: Kingdom of Bavaria, German Empire
- Branch: Luftstreitkräfte
- Type: Fighter squadron
- Engagements: World War I

Royal Bavarian Jagdstaffel 76, commonly abbreviated to Jasta 76, was a "hunting group" (i.e., fighter squadron) of the Luftstreitkräfte, the air arm of the Imperial German Army during World War I. The squadron would score over 20 aerial victories during the war. The unit's victories came at the expense of six killed in action, four wounded in action, and three taken prisoner of war.

== History ==
Jasta 76 was founded at the Bavarian Fliegerersatz-Abteilung ("Replacement Detachment") 1 at Schleißheim on 7 September 1917. It was not actually staffed and mobilized until 15 October 1917. On 4 November 1917, it was posted to Armee-Abteilung B, equipped with Albatros D.V fighters. The new squadron scored its first victory on 1 December 1917.

On 18 March 1918, Jasta 76 moved to 2 Armee. It is unknown whether its final move to Habsheim returned it to Armee-Abteilung B.

== Commanding officers (Staffelführer) ==
- Walter Böning: 15 October 1917 – 31 May 1918 (WIA)
- Ludwig Schmid: 31 May 1918 – 16 July 1918 (WIA)
- Amandus Rostock: circa 16 July 1918

== Duty stations ==
- Habsheim, France: 4 November 1917
- Liéramont, France: 18 March 1918
- Suzanne, France: 15 April 1918
- Bignicourt, France: 10 July 1918
- Habsheim, France: 19 August 1918
