= Walter Höhndorf =

- Walter Höhndorf in 1916
- Born: 10 November 1892; Prützke, German Empire
- Died: 5 September 1917 (aged 24); Iré-le-Sec, France
- Military career
- Allegiance: German Empire
- Branch: Imperial German Air Service
- Rank: Leutnant
- Units: Flieger-Abteilung (Flier Detachment) 12; Flieger-Abteilung (Flier Detachment) 67; Kampfeinsitzerkommando Vaux (Combat Single-Seater Command, Vaux); Jagdstaffel 1 (Fighter Squadron 1); Jagdstaffel 4 (Fighter Squadron 4); Jagdstaffel 14 (Fighter Squadron 14)
- Awards: Pour le Merite; Royal House Order of Hohenzollern; Iron Cross First and Second Class

Leutnant Walter Höhndorf (1892-1917) was a German pioneer aviator, test pilot, airplane designer and constructor, and fighter ace during World War I. He was credited with twelve aerial victories while flying for the Imperial German Air Service. Only one of his victories was achieved with a fighter squadron; the rest were scored while he flew for artillery direction and reconnaissance units.

== Early life ==
Walter Höhndorf was a schoolteacher's son who was fascinated with engineering and motors. He learned to fly in Paris in 1913. Upon his return, he qualified for pilot's certificate No. 582 on 3 November at Johannisthal Air Field. He became famous as an early pioneer of aerobatics in his native Germany. He also helped design and produce airplanes at Teltow's Union Flugzeugwerke.

== World War I ==
Höhndorf volunteered for aviation upon the outbreak of war. He was commissioned on 15 March 1915. He served most of that year as a test pilot for Siemens-Schuckert. In late 1915, he was assigned to Flieger-Abteilung (Flier Detachment) 12 to fly a single-seater; he shot down two Voisins on 12 and 19 January 1916. After service with Flieger-Abteilung 67, he moved on to Kampfeinsitzerkommando Vaux (Combat Single-Seater Command, Vaux) in April 1916. Between 10 April and 19 July, he shot down seven more French airplanes. He received the Pour le Mérite on 20 July 1916. He scored twice more in July, bringing his total to eleven. On 23 August, he was forwarded to Jagdstaffel 1 (Fighter Squadron 1). He scored his final victory with them, on 17 September 1916.

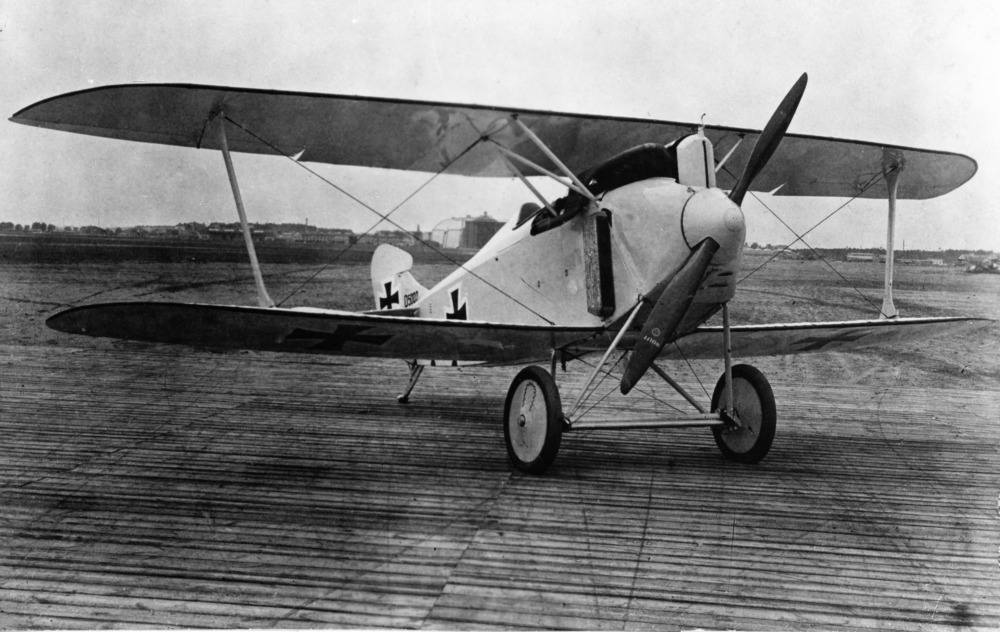
The AEG D.I, which Höhndorf designed.

After an assignment with Jagdstaffel 4, Höhndorf returned to test pilot duties, as well as instructing at Valenciennes. On 15 August 1917, he was selected to command Jagdstaffel 14. He died in a flying accident on 5 September 1917 while testing one of his own designs, the AEG D.I.
