= Walter Böning =

- Born: 14 January 1894; Grand Duchy of Oldenburg
- Died: 7 February 1981 (aged 87)
- Military career
- Allegiance: Germany
- Branch: Infantry; aviation
- Rank: Leutnant
- Units: Flieger-Abteilung 6b; Jagdstaffel 19
- Commands: Jagdstaffel 76
- Awards: Knight's Cross of the Royal House Order of Hohenzollern, Iron Cross Second and First Class, Gold Bravery Medal, Military Merit Order Fourth Class with Swords, Military Merit Order Fourth Class with Crown (signifying a second award) and Swords, Grand Duchy of Oldenburg's Friedrich-August Cross Second and First Class

Leutnant Walter Böning was a German World War I flying ace from the Grand Duchy of Oldenburg credited with 17 aerial victories. He began his World War I military service as an infantryman. He distinguished himself by winning both the Gold Medal for Bravery and the Second Class Iron Cross. He then transferred to aviation duty, training originally as a reconnaissance pilot before advancing to become a fighter pilot. Between 6 April 1917 and 30 May 1918, he was credited with 17 aerial victories. On 31 May 1918, he survived a midair collision while being attacked by British fighters. Although he coaxed his damaged machine home, the serious leg wound he had suffered sidelined him through war's end.

== Military service ==
Böning began his military career with distinguished service in Bavaria's 19th Infantry Regiment, being awarded the Golden Bravery Medal on 15 May 1915, as well as winning an Iron Cross Second Class. He then transferred to the Luftstreitkräfte (German flying service).

He began pilot training on 10 February 1916. Beginning 25 May 1916, he was posted to Flieger-Abteilung (Flier Detachment) 6b on the Western Front for artillery cooperation duties. In October 1916, he was awarded the Iron Cross First Class for his services. The following month, he was transferred to a fighter squadron, Royal Prussian Jagdstaffel 19. He scored his first victory on 6 April 1917. Böning became a balloon buster on 30 April, downing one of the observation balloons at Guyencourt. He became an ace on 23 September 1917, when he shot down two Nieuport fighters for victories five and six. These were his final wins for Jagdstaffel 9; he was given command of Royal Bavarian Jagdstaffel 76 on 5 October 1917.

Flying his Albatros D.Va marked with blue and white diamonds, he scored a victory for his new squadron on 9 December 1917, to run his total to seven. He then ran up ten more wins between 4 February and 30 May 1918. On 31 May 1918, while on combat patrol, he collided with his wingman as they were being attacked by No. 70 Squadron RAF. The wingman was shot down and killed; Böning was then severely wounded below the left knee. He managed to disengage and return to base. After safely landing the battered Albatros emblazoned with a large 'B' on its side, Böning was out of the war.

== Honors and awards ==
- Iron Cross of 1914,
  - Second Class (ca 1915)
  - First Class (October 1916)
- Gold Bravery Medal (7 May 1915)
- Military Merit Order, Fourth Class with Crown and Swords (Bavaria)
- Knight's Cross of the Royal House Order of Hohenzollern
- Friedrich August Cross, Second and First Class (Grand Duchy of Oldenburg)
