= Beine =

- Commune
- Coat of arms
- Location of Beine
- Location within France Location within Bourgogne-Franche-Comté
- Coordinates: 47°49′12″N 3°43′20″E
- Country: France
- Region: Bourgogne-Franche-Comté
- Department: Yonne
- Arrondissement: Auxerre
- Canton: Chablis

Government
  - Mayor (2020–2026): Jean Michaut
- Area^{1}: 21.57 km^{2} (8.33 sq mi)
- Highest elevation: 292 m (958 ft)
- Lowest elevation: 136 m (446 ft)
- Population (2023): 437
  - Density: 20.3/km^{2} (52.5/sq mi)
- Time zone: UTC+01:00 (CET)
  - Summer (DST): UTC+02:00 (CEST)
- INSEE/Postal code: 89034 /89800
- ^{1} French Land Register data, which excludes lakes, ponds, glaciers > 1 km^{2} (0.386 sq mi or 247 acres) and river estuaries.

Beine (French pronunciation: [bɛn]) is a commune in the Yonne department in Bourgogne-Franche-Comté in north-central France.

== See also ==
- Communes of the Yonne department
