= Jagdstaffel 1 =

Jasta 1
- Active: 1916–1918
- Country: German Empire
- Branch: Luftstreitkräfte
- Type: Fighter squadron
- Engagements: World War I: Western Front; Italian Front

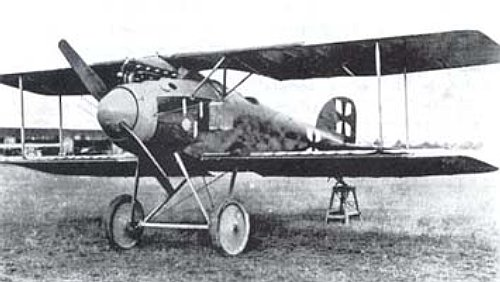
An Albatros D.II fighter aircraft, one of the models of planes used in the squadron.

Royal Prussian Jagdstaffel 1 (commonly abbreviated as Jasta 1) was a fighter squadron of the Luftstreitkräfte, the air arm of the Imperial German Army during World War I. Jasta 1 was founded on 22 August 1916, using single seat fighters drawn from First Army. It was one of the first wave of dedicated fighter squadrons founded as a result of Oswald Boelcke's espousal of massing fighter air power. Leopold Reimann scored the first of its 138 aerial victories two days later. It served on the Western Front until September 1917, transferred directly to the Italian Front to serve until March 1918, then returned to France for the rest of the war.

== Aircraft ==
Jasta 1 was originally equipped with a melange of aircraft, including Fokker D.Is, Albatros D.II fighters, at least one Albatros D.I, a Fokker E.IV, a captured Nieuport 16, Albatros D.IIIs, and Halberstadt D.IIIs.

== Commanding officers ==
Its eight Staffelnführer included Hauptmann Martin Zander, Oberleutnant Erich Hahn, Oberleutnant Hans Kummetz (on two occasions), Otto Deindl, Armbrecht (twice), Walter Korte, Bruno von Voight, and Rittmeister Kurt-Bertram von Döring.

== Personnel ==
Besides the experienced pilots transferred in from Abwehr Kommando Nord/Kampfeinsitzerstaffel B, other two-seater pilots under 1. Armee were also posted to the fledgling unit.

Among the 18 aces in the World War I ranks were Hans von Keudell, Kurt Wintgens, balloon buster Hans von Freden, Gustav Leffers, Walter Höhndorf, and Leopold Reimann. The squadron's casualties for the war were twelve killed in action, one killed in a flying accident, four wounded in action, and one captured.

== Claims and victories ==
Kurt Wintgens was Jasta 1's first ace, having claimed 13 victories while flying the Fokker Eindecker before joining the unit. He claimed 6 more before being downed and killed by Alfred Heurtaux of Escadrille N.3 in September 1916.

Vfw. Paul Bona claimed six victories December 1916—May 1917. He was killed in a crash in June 1917. Oberleutnant Hans Kummetz achieved 7 claims in a year of command before being killed in combat with Camels of No. 45 Squadron RAF in Italy early in 1918.

The squadron claimed 138 victories, with 107 of those confirmed.
