= Hans Martin Pippart =

German flying ace

Hans-Martin Pippart
- Born: 14 May 1888; Mannheim, German Empire
- Died: 11 August 1918 (aged 30) near Noyon, France
- Military career
- Allegiance: German Empire
- Branch: Flying service
- Service years: 1914–1918
- Rank: Leutnant
- Units: Flieger-Abteilung (Artillerie) 220; Kampfstaffel 1; Jagdstaffel 13
- Commands: Jagdstaffel 19
- Conflicts: World War I
- Awards: Iron Cross

Leutnant Hans Martin Pippart (14 May 1888 – 11 August 1918) Iron Cross was a pioneer aircraft manufacturer and early pilot. As a World War I German fighter ace he was credited with 22 victories.

== Early life ==
Hans Martin Pippart was born on 14 May 1888 in Mannheim, Grand Duchy of Baden.

Pippart had built airplanes and become a pilot before the beginning of World War I. He was a principal in the aeronautical firm of Pippart und Noll, which produced Eindekker airplanes. In 1913, he set an aviation endurance record.

He joined the German air forces at the start of the war. His initial assignment was as an instructor. Beginning 1 February 1916, he served some time flying artillery coordination missions in two-seaters with Flieger-Abteilung (Artillerie) 220 in Galicia on the Eastern Front. Single seater scouts were also available to him. On 11 April, he was awarded the Iron Cross, Second Class.

On 19 November 1916, he was awarded the Iron Cross, First Class. On the 21st, he was raised from the enlisted ranks to become an officer. Both Baden and Austria also decorated him.

== Aerial victories ==
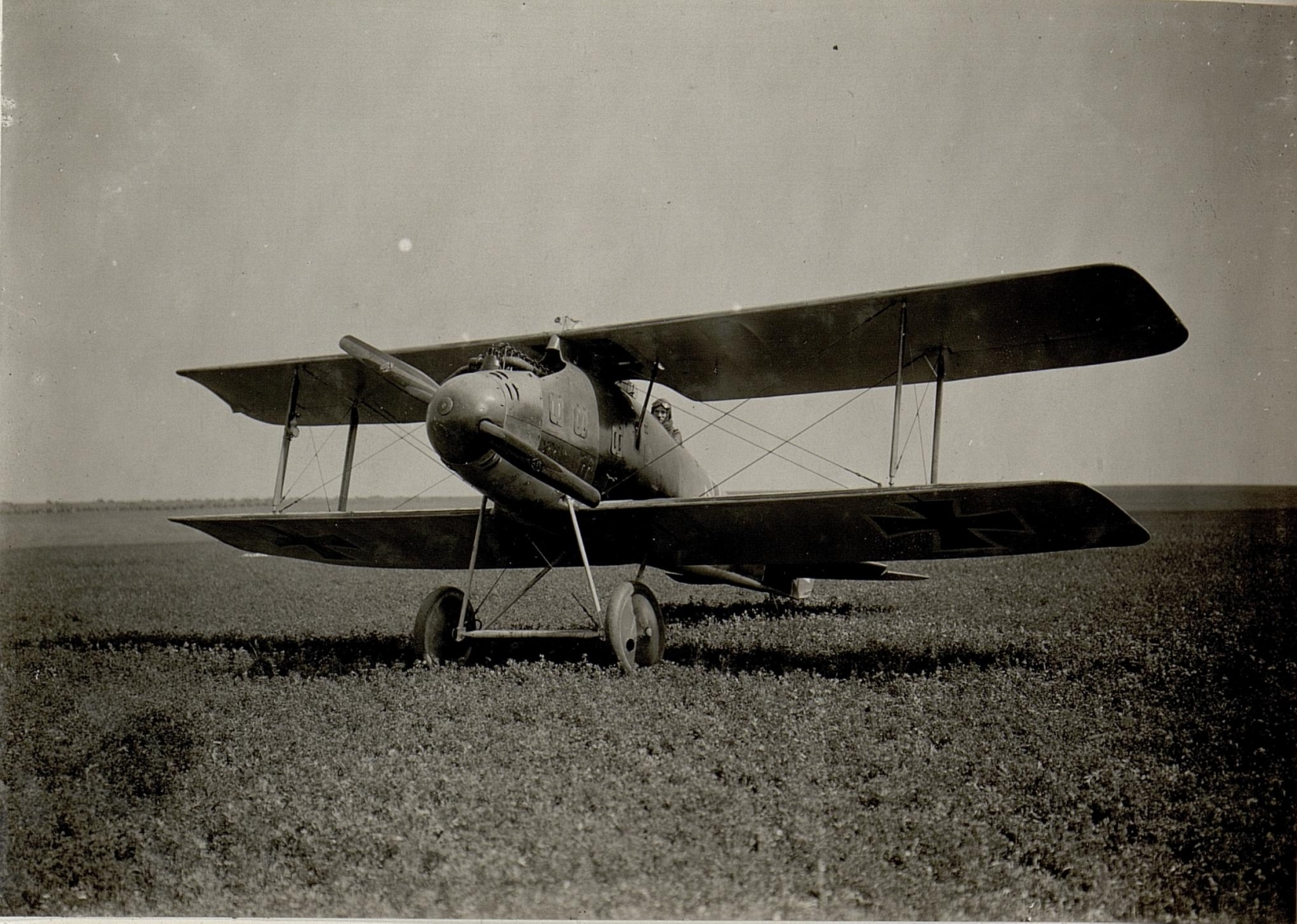
Pippart flew a Roland D.II like this for his first six victories.

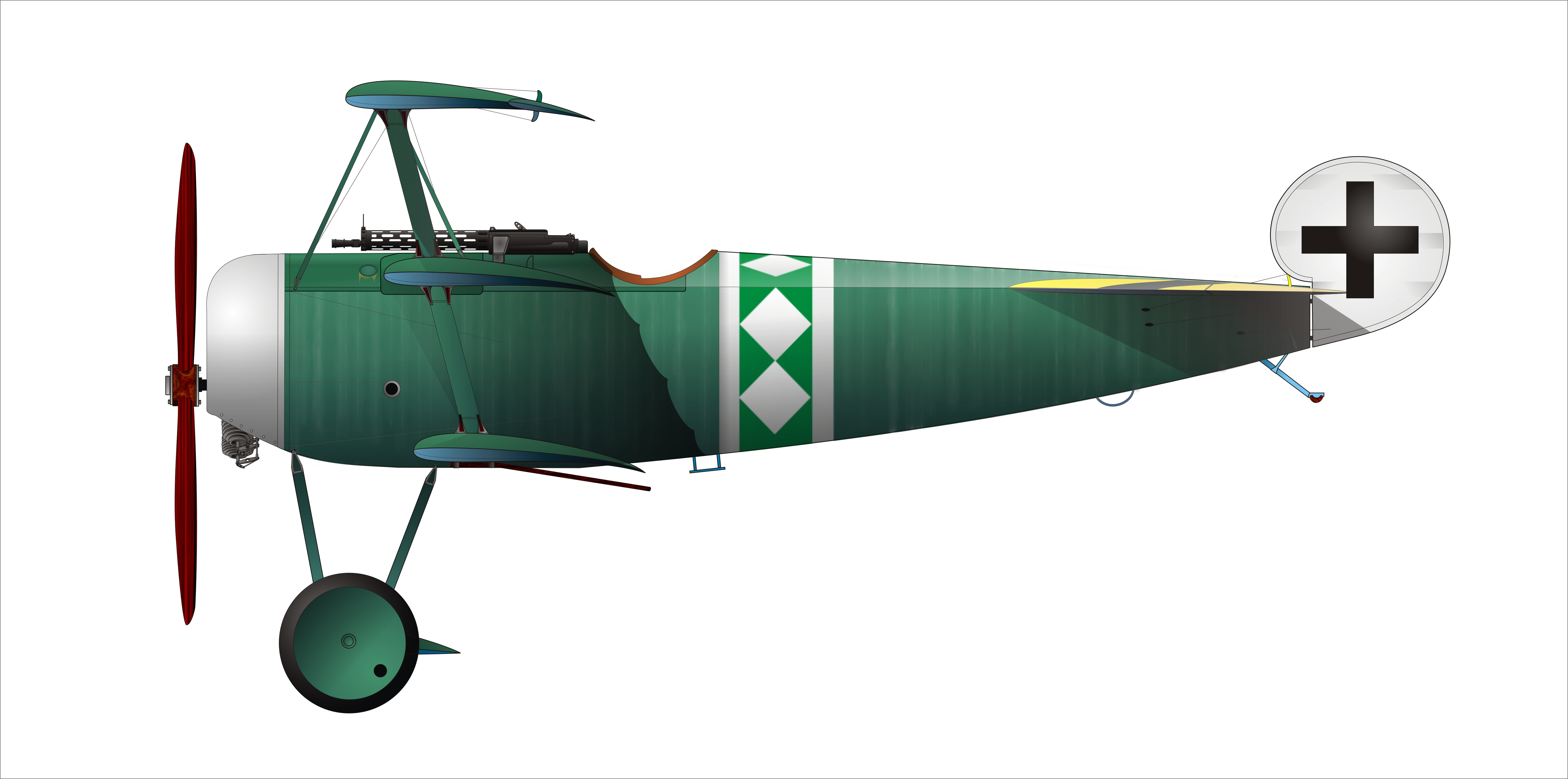
Hans Pippart flew a Fokker triplane (with duller livery than this) for four wins.

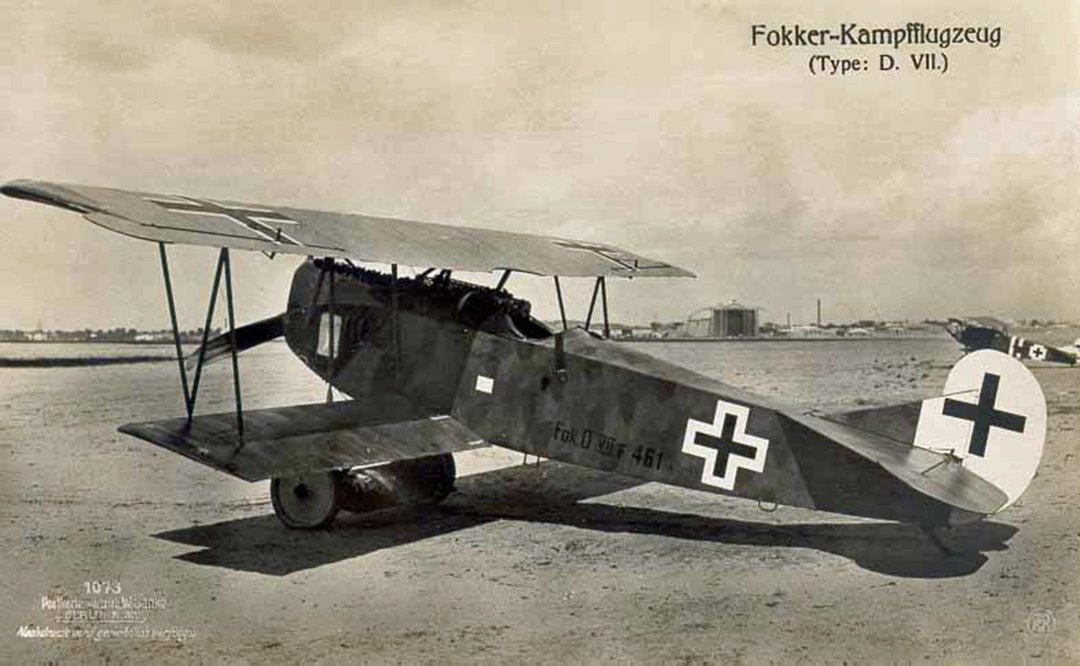
Example of Pippart's final mount, used for 12 victories, a Fokker D.VII.

Pippart scored his first win on 25 May 1917, after he had been assigned to Kampfstaffel 1 on 18 April. They were operating Roland D.IIs on the Eastern Front against the Russians.

By the end of 1917, despite flying on a quiet sector, he had six victories to his credit—two planes and four observation balloons—and was transferred to Jagdstaffel 13 on the Western Front on 4 December. On 21 February 1918, he took up his balloon busting again, downing a gas bag. On 30 March, a bullet through his craft's engine brought him down unharmed. By the time he left Jagdstaffel 13, he was a double ace. His six victories over balloons made him an ace on them alone. He had been decorated by both his native Baden and by Austria.

On 18 April 1918, he was reassigned to take the command of the Royal Prussian Jagdstaffel 19. However, it seems there must have been some lag in his transfer, as victory number ten is scored to his old squadron on 20 April. On 2 May, he scored his first victory flying a Fokker D.VII for his new squadron. That same day, he was decorated with the Knight's Cross with Swords of the Royal House Order of Hohenzollern. With four wins in May, one in June, and six in August, his score had soon grown to 21.

== His death ==
By now, Pippart was anxious to receive Germany's highest decoration, the Pour le Merite, as 20 victories made a fighter pilot eligible for the award. He was also eager to go on leave to get married. While waiting, he continued to fly combat. Pippart ended his career on 11 August 1918. He shot down a balloon, but was hit by anti-aircraft fire and found he had to abandon his airplane at an altitude of 150 feet. His parachute failed to open.

In his victory log, he was credited with seven enemy observation balloons destroyed, eight opposing fighter planes vanquished, and seven reconnaissance aircraft shot down.

Hans Martin Pippart was buried in his native Mannheim.
