= Jagdstaffel 14 =

Jasta 14
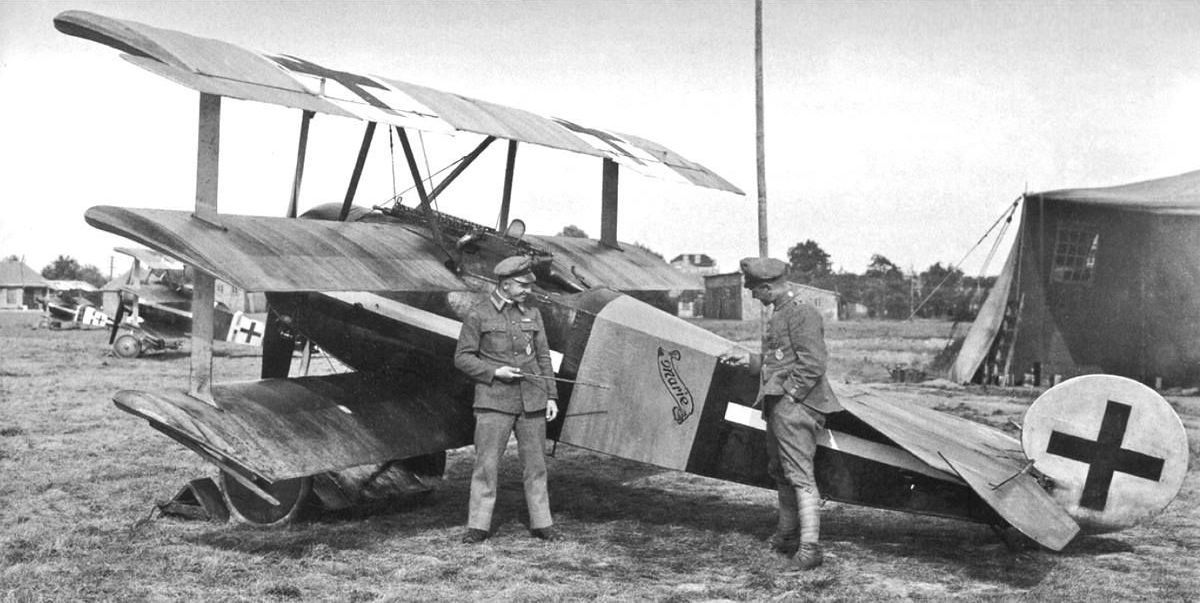
- A Jagdstaffel 14 Fokker Dr.I 489/17
- Active: 1916–1918
- Country: German Empire
- Branch: Luftstreitkräfte
- Type: Fighter squadron
- Engagements: World War I

Royal Prussian Jagdstaffel 14 was a "hunting group" (i.e., fighter squadron) of the Luftstreitkräfte, the air arm of the Imperial German Army during World War I. As one of the original German fighter squadrons, the unit would score 57 aerial victories (including five wins over enemy observation balloons) during the war. In turn, the Jasta paid a price of eight killed in action, five wounded in action, and three taken prisoner of war.

== History ==
Royal Prussian Jagdstaffel 14 was formed from a preceding ad hoc unit, Fokkerstaffel Falkenhausen, on 28 September 1916. It came into existence in the Armee-Abteilung A Sector. It served through war's end, before being disbanded as part of Germany's defeat.

== Commanding officers (Staffelführer) ==
1. Hauptmann Karl Krieg: 28 September 1916 – 14 October 1916
2. Oberleutnant Rudolf Berthold: 14 October 1916 – 12 August 1917 (WIA)
3. Leutnant Walter Höhndorf: 12 August 1917 – 5 September 1917 (KIA)
4. Leutnant Hans Werner: 5 September 1917 – 11 November 1918

== Aerodromes ==
1. Bühl, Saarburg: 28 September 1916 – 14 October 1916
2. Marchais, France: 14 October 1916 – 27 April 1917
3. La Neuville: 27 April 1917 – May 1917
4. Marchais: May 1917 – 5 November 1917
5. Boncourt: 5 November 1917 – 5 January 1918
6. Liesse: 5 January 1918 – 19 March 1918
7. Masny: 19 March 1918 – 11 April 1918
8. Phalempin: 11 April 1918 – 3 October 1918
9. Aertrycke: 3 October 1918 – 11 November 1918

== Notable members ==
Staffelführer Rudolph Berthold was one of Germany's leading aces of World War I, being in a tie for seventh place; he was awarded the Pour le Merite, Military Order of Saint Henry, and Iron Cross. Not far behind Berthold's 44 victories was Josef Veltjens, winner of 35 aerial duels, recipient of the Pour le Merite, Royal House Order of Hohenzollern, and Iron Cross. Paul Rothe won an Iron Cross as the squadron's preeminent balloon buster. Other squadron aces were Johannes Werner, Hans Bowski, and Herbert Boy.Joachim-Friedrich Huth claimed one victory [a balloon]; he would also lose part of his right leg in combat yet would be in the World War II Luftwaffe and retire as a Generalleutnant (Lieutenant General) in 1961.

== Aircraft ==
Original equipment supplied the squadron upon its inception was seven Fokker biplanes, two Fokker Eindekker monoplanes, and one Halberstadt biplane. Eventually, the unit would be one of only three squadrons operating independently of a wing that would be totally equipped with Fokker Dr.Is. Squadron marking was a black and white band running the length of a squadron plane's fuselage.

== Operations ==
When founded, Jasta 14 was in the Armee-Abteilung A Sector. When Germany's last great offensive kicked off on 21 March 1918, the squadron was supporting 17th Armee. In May 1918, the unit was switched to support of 6th Armee. They were transferred to help 4th Armee in September 1918.
