= Breguet 14 =

French WW1 bomber aircraft

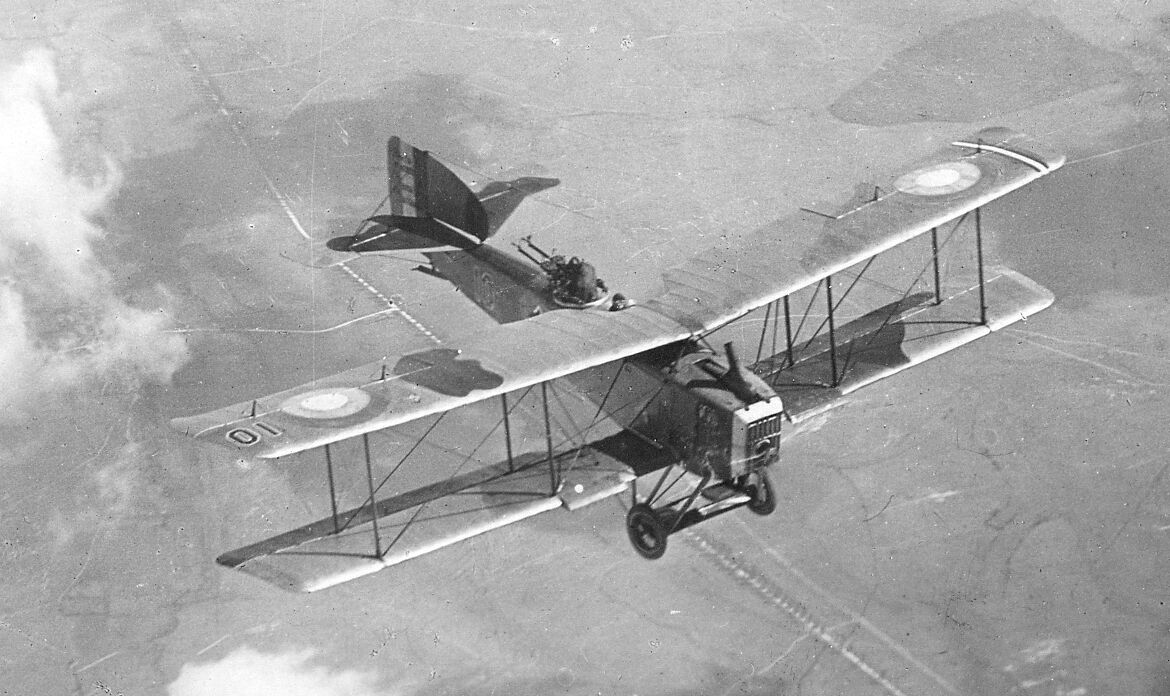

General information
- Type: Bomber and reconnaissance
- Manufacturer: Breguet
- Designer: Marcel Vuillierme
- Status: Retired
- Primary users: Aéronautique Militaire US Army Air Service; Polish Air Force; Royal Thai Air Force
- Number built: c. 8,000

History
- Manufactured: 1916–1928
- Introduction date: May 1917
- First flight: 21 November 1916
- Developed from: Breguet AV
- Variants: Breguet 16 and 17

The Breguet XIV (in contemporary practice) or Breguet 14 is a French biplane bomber and reconnaissance aircraft of World War I. It was built in very large numbers and production continued for many years after the end of the war.

The Breguet 14 was among the first mass-produced aircraft to use large amounts of aluminium, rather than wood or steel, in its structure. This allowed the airframe to be both lighter and stronger, making the aircraft fast and agile, and it was able to outrun some contemporary fighters.

== Development ==
=== Background ===
The Breguet 14 was designed by aviation pioneer and aeronautical engineer Louis Breguet. Breguet had already built a reputation for producing capable aircraft and for having innovative ideas, including the use of metal in aircraft construction. The outbreak of the First World War in 1914 led to Breguet-built aircraft being ordered by the military air services of several Triple Entente nations. He temporarily abandoned the preferred tractor configuration for a pusher design to satisfy the French general staff, who sought a clear forward view for the observer.

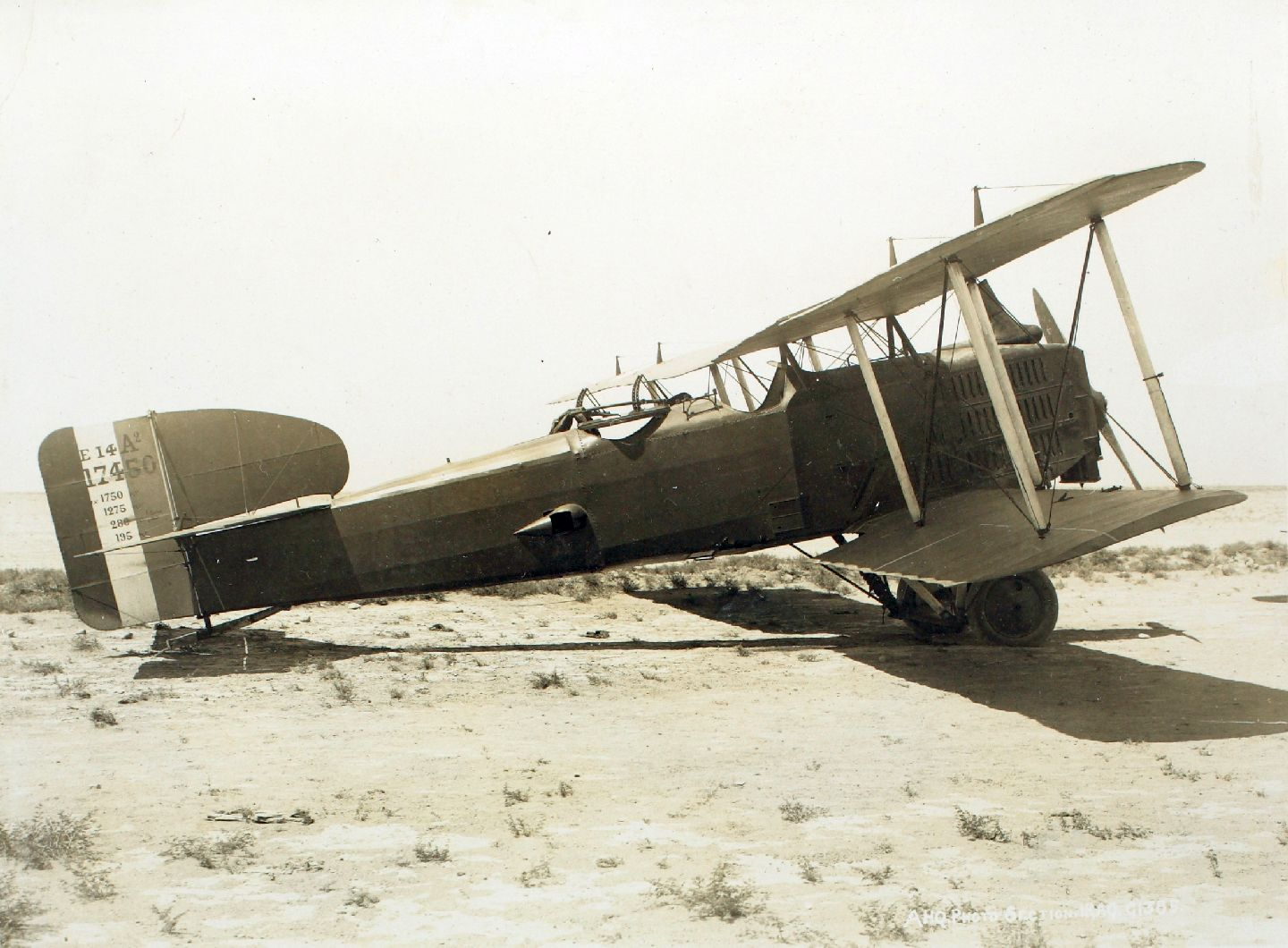
Renault powered Breguet XIV A.2 with prominent camera fairing on fuselage side for photo reconnaissance

In spite of the French official preference for pushers, Breguet remained a proponent of tractor aircraft. In June 1916, he began a new design for a military two-seater, the Breguet AV. The French Army's Section Technique de l' Aéronautique (STAé) recommended that Breguet use the Hispano-Suiza 8A V-8 engine of 130 kW (180 hp). Breguet determined that the Hispano-Suiza lacked sufficient power, and instead chose the Renault V-12 engine previously used in the Breguet Type V.

Two variants of the Breguet AV (Type XIII and Type XIV to the French authorities) were built. Both had a boxy shape that was complemented by a rectangular frontal radiator and the unusual negative or back stagger of its wings. It possessed a sturdy undercarriage, and had ailerons on the upper wing only. The lower wing had flaps along the entire trailing edges, that were forced into their raised position by the air, as the aircraft accelerated to its normal speed, being restricted from moving freely by a set of 12 adjustable rubber bungee cords.

The airframe's structure was constructed primarily of duralumin, an aluminium alloy which had been invented in Germany by Alfred Wilm only a decade previously. Many sections, such as the duralumin longerons and spacers, were attached using welded steel-tube fittings and braced using piano wire. The wing spars were rectangular duralumin tubes with either oak or ash shims at the attachment points, wrapped in a sheet steel sheath. The wooden box ribs had fretted plywood webs and ash flanges. The tail unit was built up from welded steel tube, while the elevators featured large horn balances. French officials were initially wary of the Type XIV's innovative materials due to a lack of experience with them.

=== Into flight ===
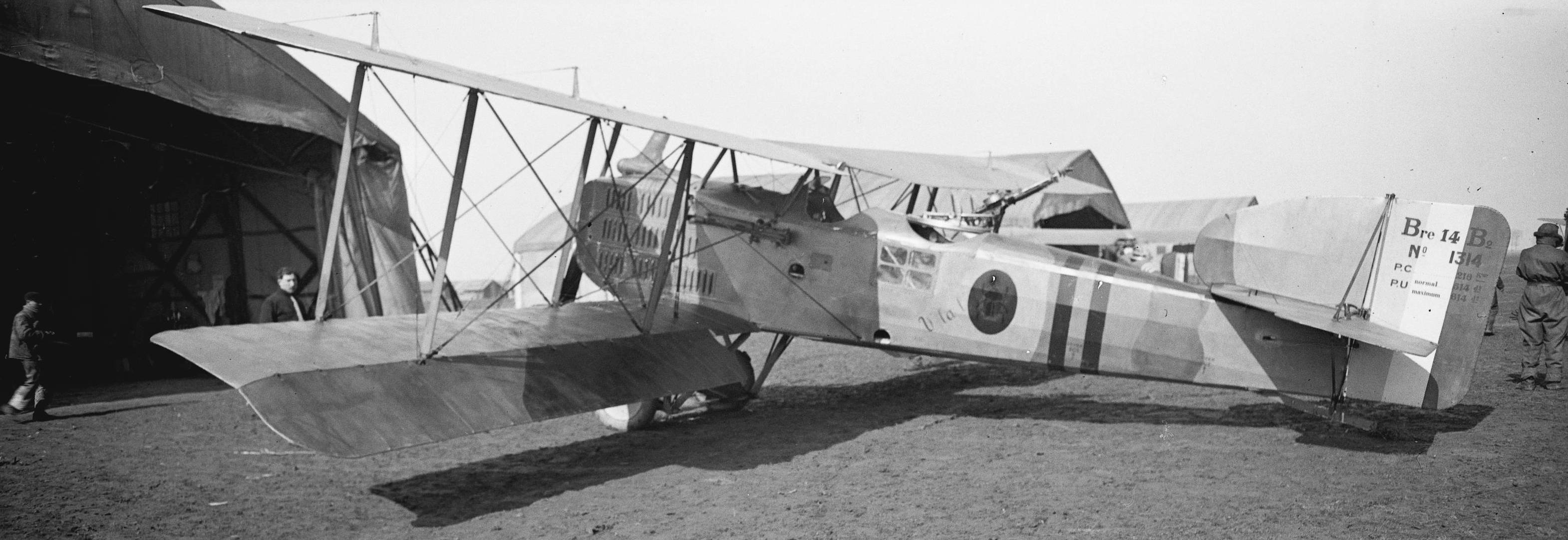
French Breguet XIV B.2 showing off the substantial flaps on the lower wings

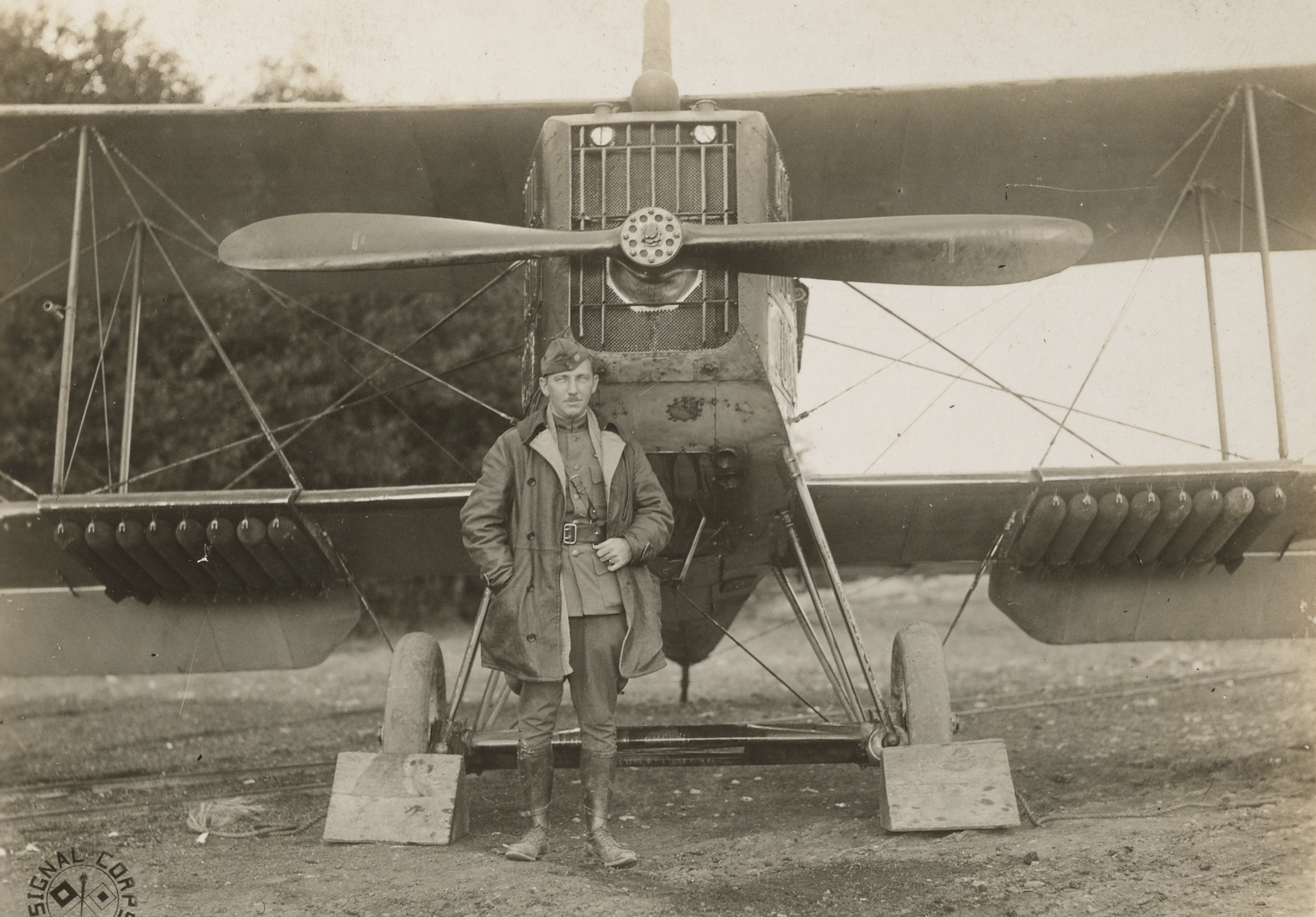
American Breguet showing off its full load of bombs

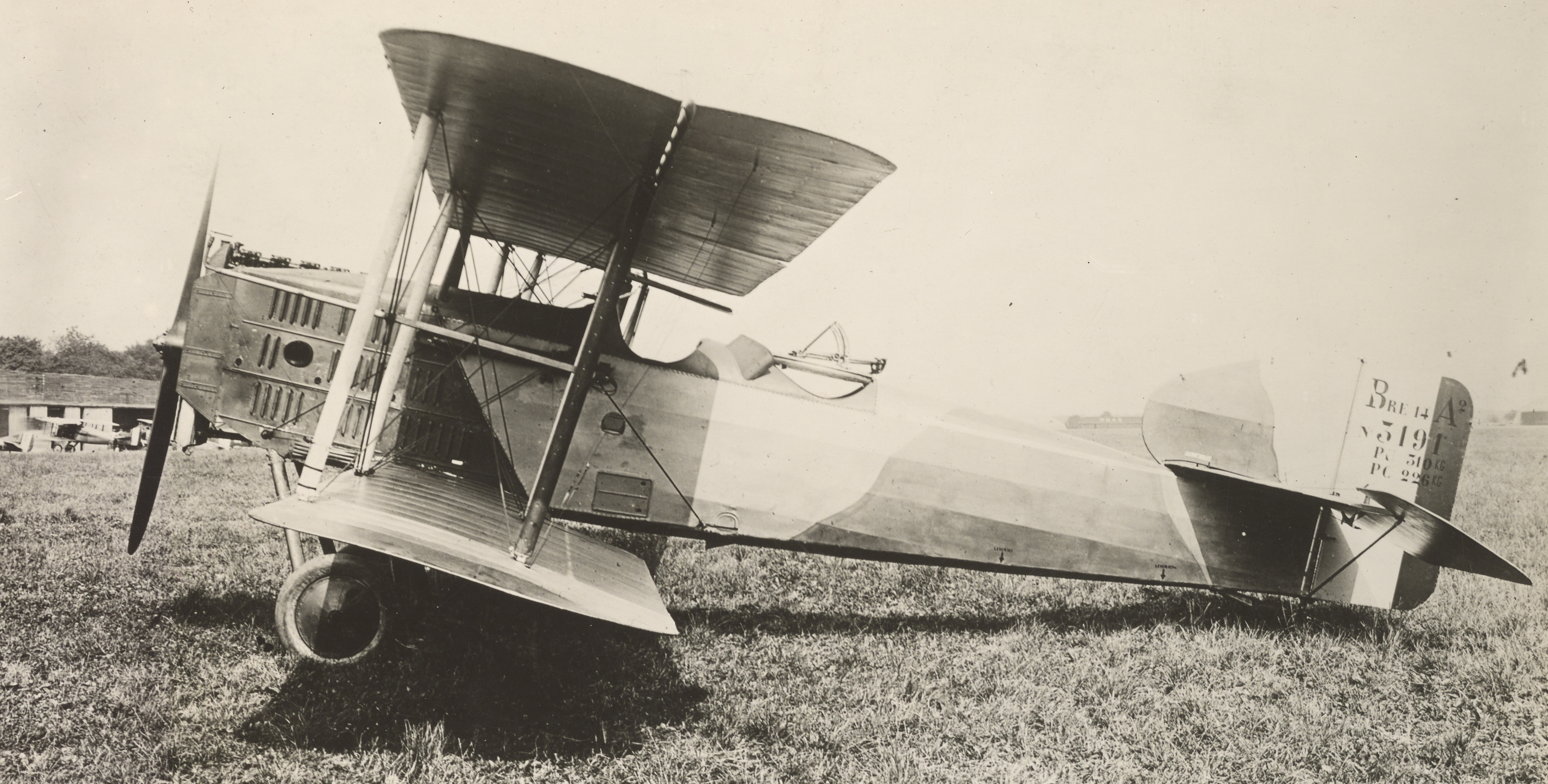
Fiat powered Breguet XIV A.2

Louis Breguet took the prototype into the air for the first time on 21 November 1916. In November 1916, the S.T.Aé. had issued requirements for four new aircraft types, and Breguet submitted the XIV for two of those - reconnaissance and bomber.

The prototype was passed to the S.T.Aé on 11 January 1917 for trials and was accepted to fill both roles. The report issued on 7 February 1917 from the trials stated that the prototype had attained a speed of 172 km/h (107 mph) at an altitude of 2,000 m (6,600 ft). On 22 February 1917, Breguet asked the S.T.Aé about initiating production and informed them on 2 March that jigs were ready. On 6 March 1917, the first official production order was received by Breguet, calling for 150 Breguet XIV A.2 reconnaissance aircraft and an additional order for 100 XIV B.2 bombers was received on 4 April. The A.2 was equipped with several cameras, while some also had radios. The lower wing of the 14 B.2 was fitted with Michelin-built bomb racks for thirty-two 115 mm (4.5 in) bombs. To avoid the bomb racks jamming the flaps, a forward extension of the wings was added, while transparent panels were added to the sides of the fuselage to aid in the use of the bomb sight.

By mid-1917, the French authorities ordered a substantial increase in production. Various other companies were contracted to manufacture the type. On 25 April, French aviation company Darracq was requested to manufacture 330 aircraft. On 8 June, 50 were ordered from Farman and on 18 June, Paul Schmitt was issued a contract to produce 200 aircraft. Some of the contractors were unable to commence quantity production of the Breguet 14 until 1918. Following the war, some aircraft were constructed in French military workshops in Indo-China, although these are likely to have been reliant on imported parts.

As an insurance against engine shortages, alternatives to the standard Renault powerplant were installed, both for experimental purposes and in production quantities. Aside from some used in France, many of the Belgian and American Breguet 14s were powered by the Fiat A.12 engine. An improved model of the standard engine, the Renault 12Ff, appeared in summer 1918 and was used on some late production aircraft. Another engine adopted, lighter but less powerful than the Renault unit, was built by French automotive company Lorraine-Dietrich. A number of late production B.2 models were equipped with the American Liberty engine. To distinguish these aircraft, they were designated Breguet XIV B.2 L.

Other minor variants of the Breguet 14 were flown in small numbers during the Great War; these included the XIV B.1 (Bombardement) long-range single-seat bomber, the XIV GR.2 (Grande Raid) long-range reconnaissance/bomber, the XIV H (Hydro) floatplane, the XIV S (Sanitaire) air ambulance and the XIV Et.2 (Ecole) trainer. Later variants, such as the XIVbis A.2 and XIVbis B.2, had improved wings. A variant with enlarged wings was produced as the XVI Bn.2 (Bombardement de nuit) night bomber. Further derivatives of the aircraft included the XVII C.2 (Chasse) two-seat fighter, which was only built in small numbers due to the end of the war. Production of the Breguet 14 continued long after the end of the war, only ending in 1926.

== Operational history ==
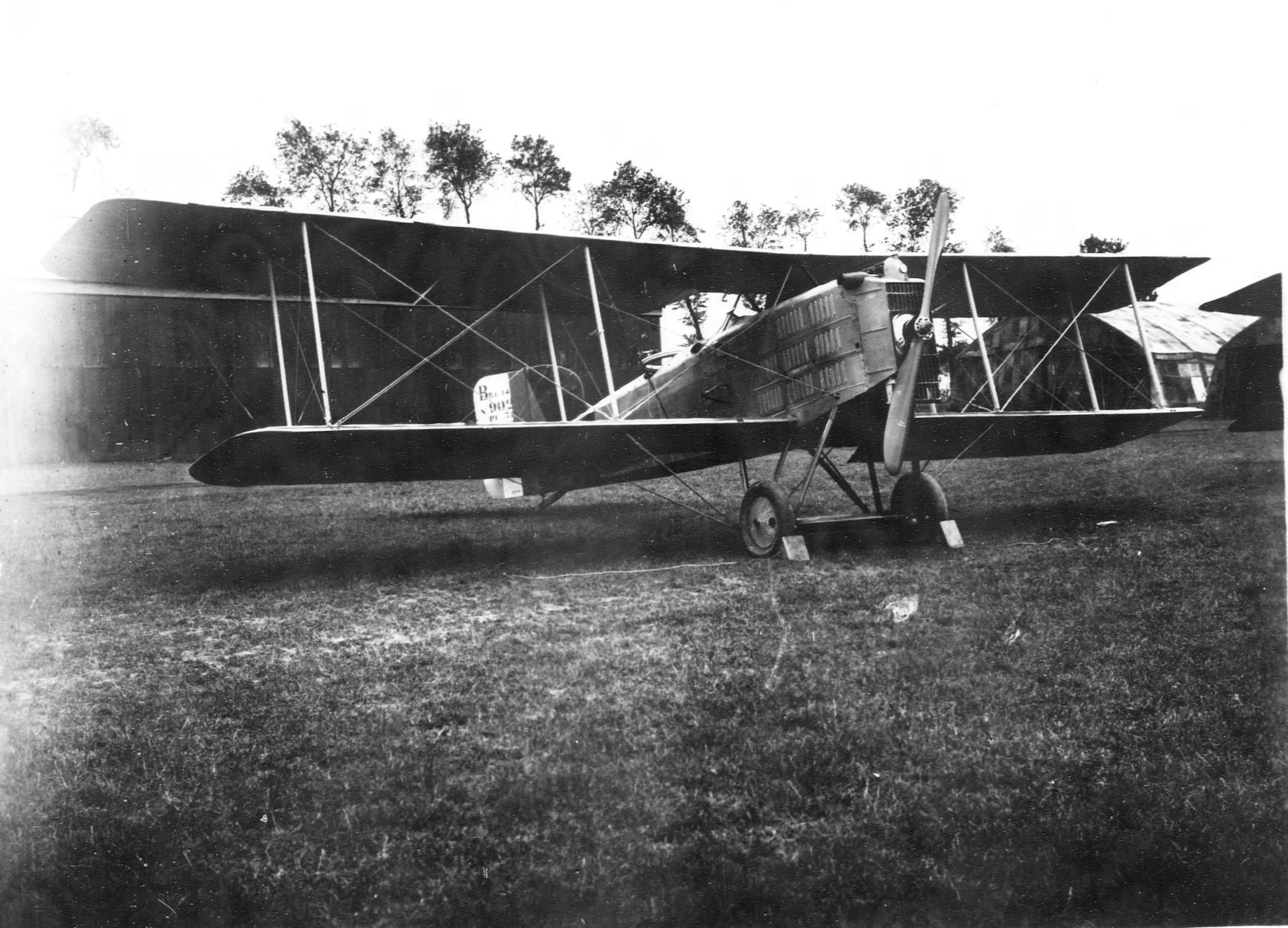
United States Army Air Service Breguet 14 in France, 1918

The Breguet 14 was used in large numbers from May 1917 onwards, and at its peak equipped at least 71 escadrilles, and was deployed on both the Western Front, where it participated in number major actions in which it typically acquitted itself well, and in the east, on the Italian front.

For its actions during the Battle of the Lys, the Section Artillerie Lourde, equipped with the type, received a citation and was further lauded for its actions during the Allied counter-attack to the German spring offensive. On 9 July 1918, Capitaine Paul-Louise Weiller shot down two enemy aircraft during one sortie while flying the type.

Following its introduction by the French, during 1918, the Breguet 14 was also ordered by the Belgian Army (40 aircraft) and the United States Army Air Service (over 600 aircraft). Around half the Belgian and U.S. aircraft were fitted with Fiat A.12 engines due to shortages of the original Renault 12F. Prior to the Armistice of 11 November 1918 the Breguet 14 was typically assigned to serve in both reconnaissance and bombing roles. By the end of the conflict, the type was reportedly responsible for having dropped over 1,887,600 kg (4,161,400 lb) of bombs.

A Breguet 14 played a role in one of the last acts of the war: during November 1918, one aircraft was used to transport a German military officer, Major von Geyer, from Tergnier and Spa. It was covered in large white flags of truce to avoid being attacked.

The type continued to be widely used after the war, equipping the French occupation forces in Germany and being deployed to support French troops in the colonies. A special version was developed for the harsh conditions encountered overseas, designated "14 TOE" (Théatres des Operations Extérieures). These saw service in putting down uprisings in Syria and Morocco, in Vietnam and in the French intervention in the Russian Civil War. The last trainer examples were not withdrawn from French military service until 1932.

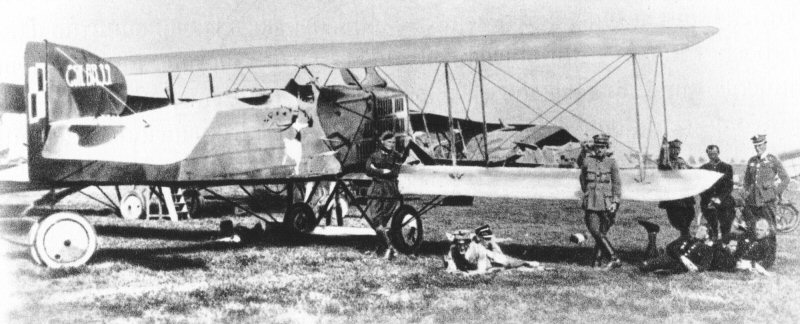
Polish Breguet 14 during the Kiev offensive

Other air arms using the type included Brazil (30), China (70), Czechoslovakia (10), Denmark (4), Finland (38), Greece (approximately 42), Japan (2), the Siamese Air Force (42), Uruguay (9) and Spain (approximately 180). The Polish Air Force used 158 Breguet 14s, about 70 of them being used in combat in the Polish-Soviet war. In Japan, Breguet 14s were licence-built by Nakajima. The type was also heavily used in various internal wars in China during the 1920s and 1930s.

Weeks after the signing of the Armistice, the Breguet 14 was used to conduct several long-distance flights to demonstrate its capabilities. On 26 January 1919, a double crossing of the Mediterranean was flown using the type by Lt Roget and Captaine Coli. On 5 April, Roget flew from Lyon to Rome and then to Nice. Roget and Coli later establish a new French long-distance record flying the Breguet 14, flying from Paris to Kenitra, Morocco, a distance of 1,900 km (1,200 mi) in 11 hours 15 minutes. Aviation pioneer Pierre-Georges Latécoère converted one example to conduct experimental in-flight refuelling operations.

After the war, Breguet manufactured dedicated civil versions of the Breguet 14. The 14 T.2 Salon carried two passengers in a specially modified fuselage. An improved version, the 14 Tbis, was built as both a land-plane and seaplane. The 14 Tbis also formed the basis of the improved 14 Tbis Sanitaire air ambulance version, and 100 mail planes custom-built for Latécoère's airline, Lignes Aeriennes Latécoère. After changing its name to "CGEA", the airline used, among others, 106 Breguet 14s for flights over the Sahara desert. The 18 T was a single 14 T re-engined with a Renault 12Ja engine, equipped to carry four passengers. When production finally ceased in 1928, the total for all versions built had exceeded 7,800 (according to other sources, 8,000 or even 8,370).

== Variants ==
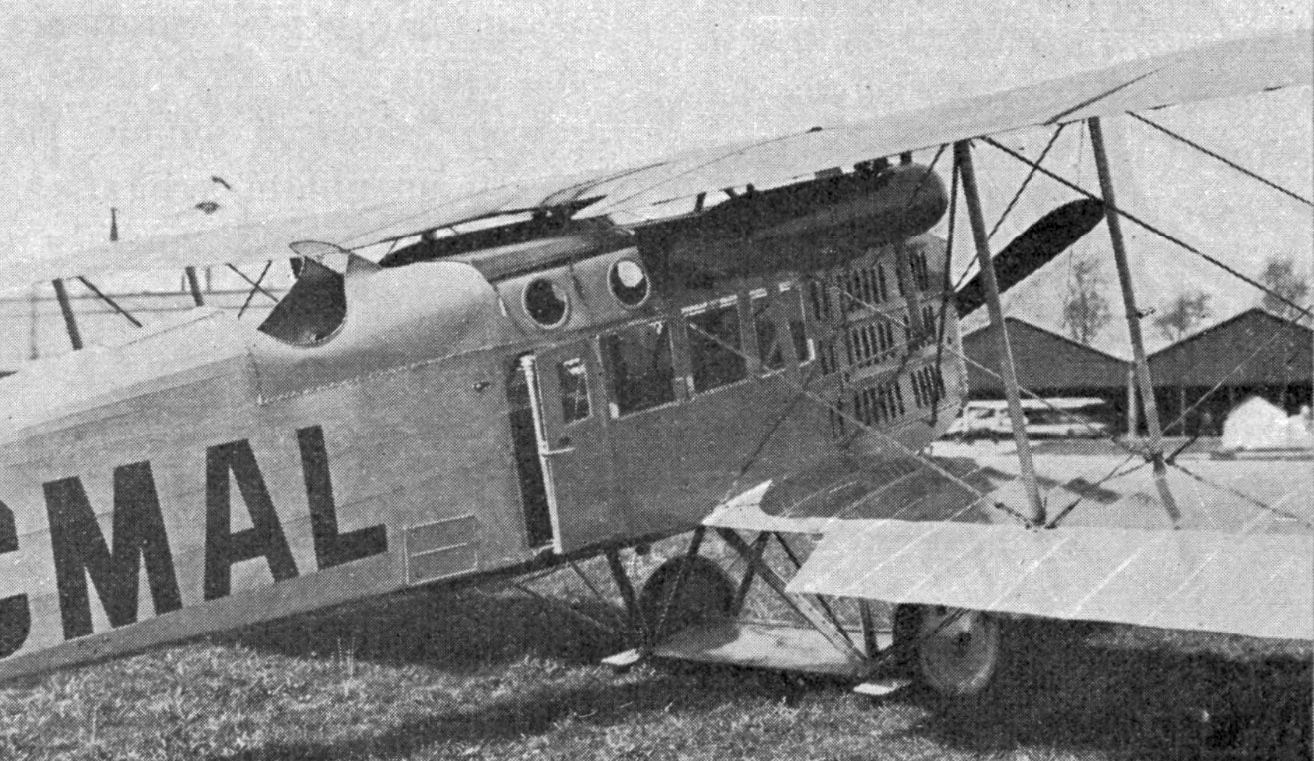
Breguet 14T bis Sanitaire photo from L'Aéronautique October 1921

Data from:

Breguet AV 1
(Given the STAé designation Breguet 13) Company designation of the first aircraft of the Breguet 13/14 family. Powered by a 263 hp (196 kW) Renault V-12 engine with short fuselage and all-flying rudder.
Breguet AV 2
(Given the STAé designation Breguet 14) Company designation of the second aircraft of the Breguet 13 / 14 family. Powered by a 263 hp (196 kW) Renault V-12 engine in a longer fuselage with fixed fin.
Breguet 13
AV 1 the first of the Breguet 14 family with a short fuselage and no fixed fin.
Breguet 14 A.2
Basic production variant to the two-seat Army co-operation specification (A.2), typically powered by a 300 hp (220 kW) Renault 12Fe V-12 engine.
Breguet 14 AP.2
High-altitude, long-range reconnaissance variant, powered by a 400 hp (300 kW) Liberty L-12 engine. One converted from an A.2
Breguet 14 AE
A single aircraft, (F-AEEZ), converted for use in the colonies.
Breguet 14/400
Postwar aircraft powered by 400 hp (300 kW) Lorraine-Dietrich 12Da V-12 engines. Seventy aircraft delivered to China and Manchuria.
Breguet 14 C
A single aircraft powered by a 450 hp (340 kW) Renault 12Ja V-12 engine for use as a postal aircraft in the United States.
Breguet 14 H
A floatplane version powered by a 320 hp (240 kW) Renault 12Fe, with a large central float and smaller floats under each wing. At least two were built, used in Indo-China.
Breguet 14 B.2
The two-seat bomber version.
Breguet 14 B.1
A single-seat bomber version: two were ordered for a planned raid on Berlin.
Breguet 14 floatplane
A twin float hydroplane version, tested at St Raphaël in 1924.
Breguet 14 S
(S – Sanitaire) Ambulance aircraft modified to carry two stretchers in the rear fuselage. (A later dedicated ambulance aircraft was also produced).
Nakajima B-6
Breguet 14 B.2 bombers licence-built in Japan by Nakajima, powered by 360 hp (270 kW) Rolls-Royce Eagle V-12 engines.
Yackey BRL-12 Transport
American conversion of a 14 B.2 with corrugated fuselage skins and floats.
B.Th.1
(Thai: บ.ท.๑) Royal Siamese Air Force designation for the Breguet 14 A and 14 B.

== Operators ==
Argentina

- Aeroposta Argentina
- Compañía Franco-Argentina de Transportes Aéreos SA

Belgium

- Belgian Air Force operated by the 2nd, 3rd, 5th escadrilles until the mid-1920s.
- SNETA

Brazil

- Aviação Militar do Exército Brasileiro operated 30 14A2 and 14B2 from 1920 until 1928.

China

- Nationalist Chinese Air Force operated 50 until 1932.

Czechoslovakia

- Czechoslovak Air Force obtained 10 Breguet 14s in 1919.

Denmark

- Danish Air Force operated several from 1920 until 1927.

El Salvador

- Salvadoran Air Force a single example was bought from France in the mid-1920s, but crashed in 1927 while delivering smallpox vaccine.

Estonia

- Estonian Air Force operated one aircraft only.

Finland

- Finnish Air Force received 22 between 1919 and 1921 and operated them until 1927.

France

- Armée de l'Air
- French Navy used the Breguet 14 for reconnaissance from 1922, with the type remaining in service until 1930.

Greece

- Royal Hellenic Air Force Beginning in November 1917, Breguet 14s equipped the 532 Bombing and reconnaissance squadron and from June 1918, the 533 Fighter squadron. The Breguet 14 served in the 1919-1924 Greco-Turkish war but was replaced by Breguet 19s in 1925.

Guatemala

- Guatemalan Air Force Three delivered, but returned unused after the instructor who accompanied them died.

Japan

- Imperial Japanese Army Air Force One 14 B.2 was purchased and a second one was built locally by Nakajima as the B-6.

Central Lithuania

- Army of Central Lithuania received two ex-Polish aircraft in 1920.

(Iran) Persia

- Iranian Air Force received two aircraft in 1924.

Paraguay

- Paraguayan Air Arm – one aircraft used in the Revolution of 1922

Poland

- Polish Air Force - three French escadrilles were redesignated as Polish and transferred with their aircraft to Poland in 1919. These were supplemented with an additional 70 aircraft which were eventually retired in 1924.

Portugal

- Portuguese Air Force operated 28 14 A.2s and a single 14 T from 1919 until 1931.

Romania

- Royal Romanian Air Force operated 20 14 B.2s until replaced in the mid-1920s

Serbia

- Serbian Air Force - During WW1 three French escadrilles operated in Serbia with Serbian crews, and their aircraft eventually transferred to Serbia - who used them until 1923

Soviet Union

- Soviet Air Force

Spain

- Spanish Air Force

Sweden

- Swedish Air Force - received one aircraft only in 1919, which was given a civil registration in 1923.

(Thailand) Siam

- Royal Siamese Air Force 40+ aircraft

Turkey

- Turkish Air Force

United States

- United States Army Air Service
  - 96th Aero Squadron

Uruguay

- Uruguayan Air Force

Kingdom of Yugoslavia

- Yugoslav Royal Air Force may have operated one ex-Serbian example.

== Survivors and replicas ==
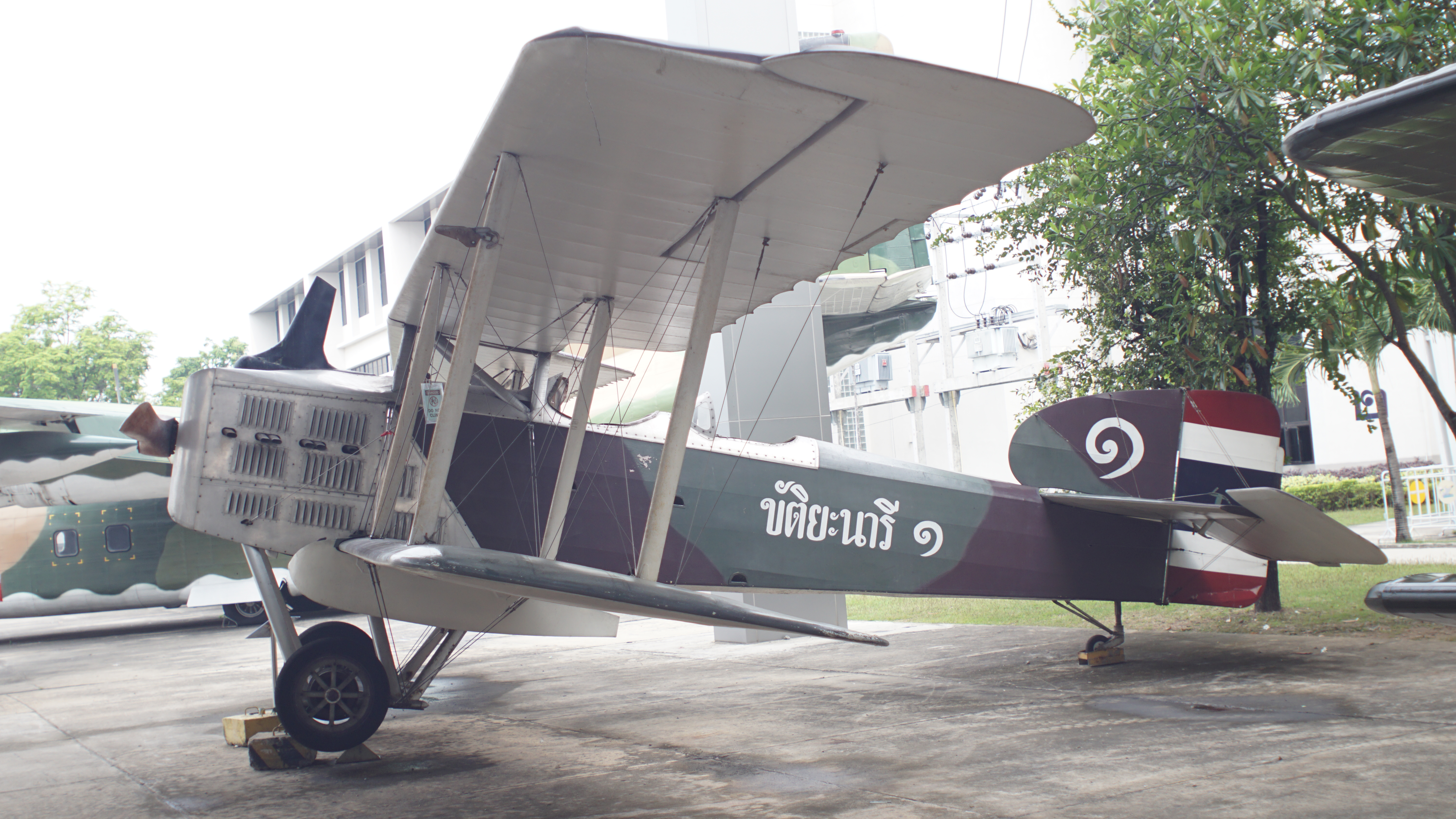
Replica Breguet 14 at the Royal Thai Air Force Museum

- Bre.2016 - Breguet 14 A.2 is on display at the Musée de l'air et de l'espace in Paris, France in French markings.
- 3C30 - The last survivor of 22 (or 30) examples bought shortly after the end of WW1, this Breguet 14 A.2 arrived in 1921, and was operational from 1922 until retired in 1927. It was on display following an extensive restoration at the Finnish Air Force Museum in Jyväskylä, Finland to its original Finnish markings.
- A replica Breguet 14 built in 1980 as F-AZBP, and which appeared in several movies has been on display at the Royal Thai Air Force Museum in Bangkok since 2012 in Siamese markings as B.TH1.
- A replica registered as F-AZBH is regularly flown on the French Airshow circuit, currently marked as an early aircraft, without camouflage, while it was previously marked as a Latécoère machine.
- A replica marked as Bre.2812 and carrying the markings of the US Air Service's 96th Aero Squadron is on display at the Omaka Aviation Heritage Centre in New Zealand.

== Specifications (14 B.2) ==
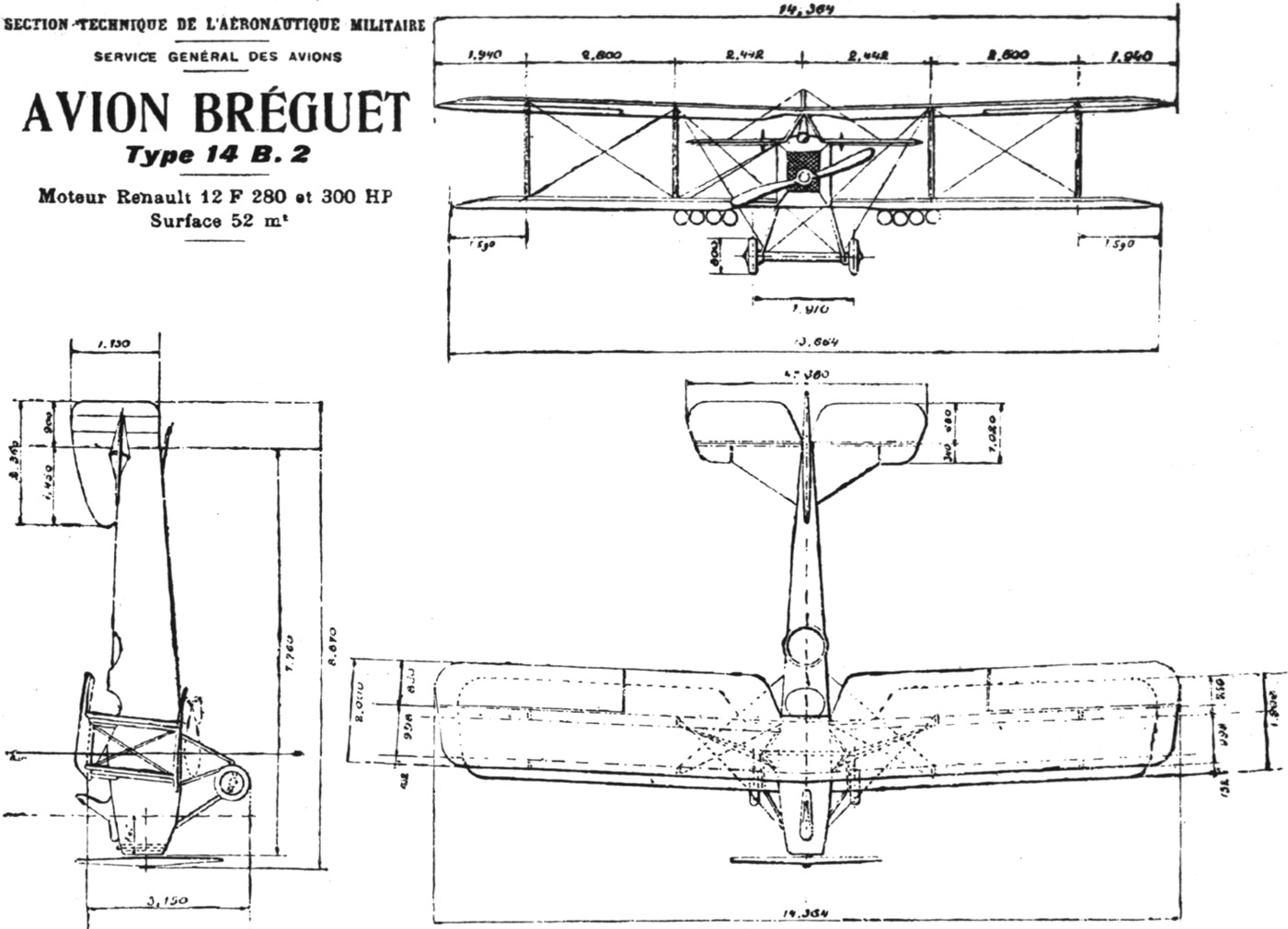
Breguet 14 B.2 drawing

Data from French aircraft of the First World War, Profile #157 :The Breguet 14

General characteristics

- Crew: Two
- Length: 8.870 m (29 ft 1 in)
- Upper wingspan: 14.364 m (47 ft 2 in) with original ailerons

14.86 m (48.8 ft) with balanced ailerons

- Lower wingspan: 13.664 m (44 ft 10 in) with original ailerons

13.284 m (43.58 ft) with balanced ailerons

- Height: 3.33 m (10 ft 11 in)
- Wing area: 50.2 m^{2} (540 sq ft) with original ailerons

48.5 m^{2} (522 sq ft) with balanced ailerons

- Airfoil: Eiffel 4.6%
- Empty weight: 1,017 kg (2,242 lb)
- Gross weight: 1,769 kg (3,900 lb)
- Powerplant: 1 × Renault 12Fcx V-12 water-cooled piston engine, 220 kW (300 hp)

Alternative engines

Renault 12Fcy 230 kW (310 hp)
Renault 12Fe 240 kW (320 hp) sometimes fitted with Rateau turbocharger
Renault 12Ff 260 kW (350 hp)
Renault 12K 300 kW (400 hp)
Fiat A.12 190 kW (260 hp)
Fiat A.14 450 kW (600 hp)
Lorraine-Dietrich 12Da 280 kW (370 hp)
Lorraine-Dietrich 12E 290 kW (390 hp)
Liberty L-12 300 kW (400 hp)
Panhard 12C 260 kW (350 hp)
Panhard 12D 250 kW (340 hp)
Rolls-Royce Eagle VIII 270 kW (360 hp) (Nakajima B-6)

- Propellers: 2-bladed Ratier série 34 fixed-pitch wooden propeller, 2.940 m (9 ft 8 in) diameter with Renault 12F engines

(2-bladed Ratier série 34 fixed-pitch wooden propeller with Liberty L-12 engine)

Performance

- Maximum speed: 195 km/h (121 mph, 105 kn)
- Endurance: 2 hours 45 minutes
- Service ceiling: 6,200 m (20,300 ft)
- Rate of climb: 4.867 m/s (958.1 ft/min)
- Time to altitude:

2,000 m (6,600 ft) in 9 minutes 15 seconds
3,000 m (9,800 ft) in 16 minutes 30 seconds
5,000 m (16,000 ft) in 47 minutes

- Wing loading: 32 kg/m^{2} (6.6 lb/sq ft) (at max. takeoff weight)
- Power/mass: 0.15 kW/kg (0.09 hp/lb) (at max. takeoff weight)

Armament

- Guns: 1 × fixed 7.7 mm (0.303 in) Vickers machine gun + 2 × flexible 7.7 mm (0.303 in) Lewis Gun on T.O.3 or T.O.4 mount for the observer
- Bombs: up to 355 kg (783 lb) of bombs, typically 32x 8 kg (18 lb) 115mm bombs

== See also ==
Related development

- Breguet 16
- Breguet 17

Aircraft of comparable role, configuration, and era

- Airco DH.4
- Airco D.H.9
- Armstrong Whitworth F.K.8
- Royal Aircraft Factory R.E.8
- Salmson 2

Related lists

- List of military aircraft of France
- List of bomber aircraft
