= Jagdstaffel 10 =

Jasta 10
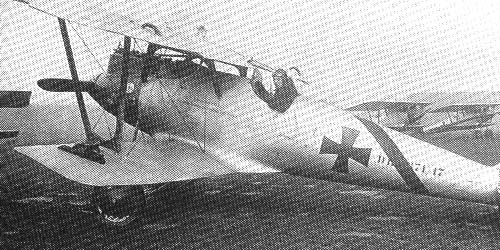
- Friedrich Rudenberg in his Pfalz D.III
- Active: 1916–1918
- Country: German Empire
- Branch: Luftstreitkräfte
- Type: Fighter squadron
- Part of: Jagdgeschwader 1
- Engagements: World War I

Royal Prussian Jagdstaffel 10 was a World War I "hunting group" (i.e., fighter squadron) of the Luftstreitkräfte, the air arm of the Imperial German Army during World War I. Jasta 10, in its brief existence, was credited with 118 enemy planes and 33 enemy observation balloons destroyed. In turn, it would lose twenty killed in action, another killed in a flying accident, ten wounded in action, and four held as prisoners of war.

== History ==
Royal Prussian Jagdstaffel 10 was founded from the pre-existing KEK 3 on 28 September 1916 at Phalempin. It was promptly dubbed "Jagdstaffel Linck", after its original commanding officer.

== Commanding Officers (Staffelführer) ==
1. Ludwig Linck: 21 September 1916 – 22 October 1916 (KIA)
2. Karl Rummelspacher: 23 October 1916 – 18 June 1917
3. Albert Dossenbach: 24 June 1917 – 3 July 1917 (KIA)
4. Ernst Freiherr von Althaus: 6 July 1917 – 30 July 1917
5. Werner Voss: 30 July 1917 – 23 September 1917 (KIA)
6. Ernst Weigand: 24 September 1917 – 25 September 1917 (KIA)
7. Max Kühn (Acting): 26 September 1917 – 27 September 1917
8. Hans Klein: 27 September 1917 – 19 February 1918 (WIA)
9. Hans Weiss (Acting): 27 March 1918 – 1 April 1918
10. Erich Löwenhardt (Acting): 1 April 1918 – 19 June 1918
11. Alois Heldmann (Acting): 19 June 1918 – 6 July 1918
12. Erich Löwenhardt: 6 July 1918 – 10 August 1918 (KIA)
13. Alois Heldmann (Acting): 10 August 1918 – 14 August 1918
14. Arthur Laumann: 14 August 1918 – 11 November 1918

== Duty stations (airfields) ==
1. Phalempin: 28 September 1916 – 27 October 1916
2. Jametz, near Stenay: 28 October 1916 – 12 December 1916
3. Angevillers: 12 December 1916 – Unknown
4. Leffincourt: Unknown – 1 May 1917
5. Bersée, Douai: 2 May 1917 – 24 May 1917
6. Heule, Courtrai: 25 May 1917 – 2 July 1917
7. Marckebeke: 2 July 1917 – 21 November 1917
8. Iwuy: 21 November 1917 – 20 March 1918
9. Awoingt: 20 March 1918 – 27 March 1918
10. Léchelle, Pas-de-Calais: 27 March 1918 – 3 April 1918
11. Harbonnières: 3 April 1918 – 12 April 1918
12. Cappy: 12 April 1918 – 13 April 1918
13. Lomme: 14 April 1918 – 21 May 1918
14. Etreux, Guise: 21 May 1918 – 26 May 1918
15. Puisieux-et-Clanlieu: 26 May 1918 – 31 May 1918
16. Rugny Ferme, Beugneux: 31 May 1918 – 18 July 1918
17. Monthussart Ferme: 18 July 1918 – 29 July 1918
18. Puisieux-et-Clanlieu: 29 July 1918 – 10 August 1918
19. Ennemain, Falvy: 10 August 1918 – 11 August 1918
20. Bernes: 12 August 1918 – 30 August 1918
21. Escaufourt: 30 August 1918 – 20 September 1918
22. Metz-Frescaty: 25 September 1918 – 8 October 1918
23. Marville: 9 October 1918 – 6 November 1918
24. Tellancourt: 7 November 1918 – 11 November 1918

== Notable personnel ==
Jasta 10 had thirteen aces serve in its ranks. Many of its commanding officers were notable aces, such as Althaus, Dossenbach, Heldmann, Klein, Laumann, Löwenhardt, Voss, and Weiss, but there were also noteworthy aces within the squadron who did not rise to its command, such as Paul Aue, Friedrich Friedrichs, Justus Grassmann, and Friedrich Schumacher.

== Aircraft and operations ==
Original equipment upon foundation was four Fokker E.IVs, Albatros D.IIs, Albatros D.IIIs, two Fokker D.IIs and a Halberstadt D.II. Later in the war, during the Summer of 1918, the unit operated Albatros D.Vs, Pfalz D.IIIs, Fokker D.VIIs, Fokker Dr.I triplanes, and a few Fokker D.VIIIs. The triplanes often had their cowlings painted black, with white facing.

The jasta's first victory was by Paul Aue on 25 March 1917, as it began its support of 5th Armee. Jasta 10 moved to support of 4 Armee in early 1917, near Courtrai. In June 1917, Jasta 10 joined the Flying Circus, with Jasta 4, Jasta 6, and Jasta 11 forming the new fighter wing. The Jasta supported various armies on several fronts as the tempo of the war increased.

Jasta 10 was disbanded after the end of the war.
