= Jagdstaffel 4 =

Jasta 4
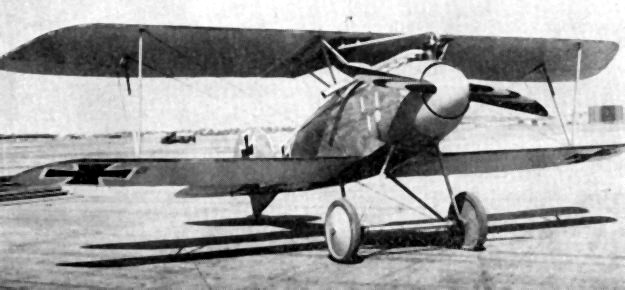
- Albatross D.III
- Active: 1916–1918
- Country: German Empire
- Branch: Luftstreitkräfte
- Type: Fighter squadron
- Engagements: World War I

Royal Prussian Jagdstaffel 4, commonly abbreviated to Jasta 4, was a "hunting group" (i.e., fighter squadron) of the Luftstreitkräfte, the air arm of the Imperial German Army during World War I. The unit would score 192 confirmed victories; in turn, it would suffer 11 killed in action, 9 wounded in action, and two taken prisoner of war. It was one of the units in the famed Flying Circus.

== History ==
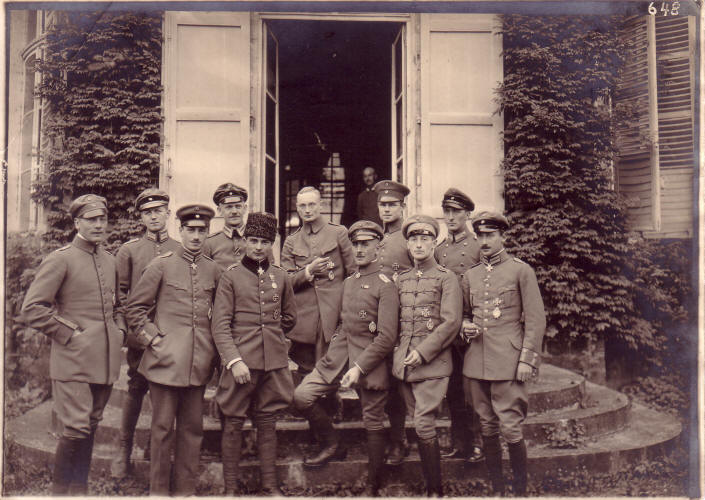
Jasta 4 at Vaux Castle, "This photo was taken to celebrate the bestowal of the Pour le Mérite to Oblt. Rudolf Berthold on 12 October 1916. From left to right are: Ltn. Alfred Lenz, Ltn. Karl Stehle, Lt. Höhndorf;, Vzfw. Hermann Margot, Oblt. Berthold, Ltn. Kralweski, Berthold, Leutnant Bernert, Oblt. Althaus, Ltn. Hans Malchow and Lt. Wilhelm Frankl."

Jasta 4 was founded on 25 August 1916, drawing personnel from FFA 23 and other two-seater reconnaissance units within 2 Armee, as well as from Kampfeinsitzerkommando Vaux and Armee-Flugpark Nr. 2. In June 1917, it switched to support and control of the 4 Armee. On 24 June 1917, it became part of the forming Jagdgeschwader I (JG I). Also during that summer, the unit suffered a partial leadership vacuum, with its commanding officer Kurt-Bertram von Döring double-tasked with command of JG 1 due to the wounding of its CO, Manfred von Richthofen.

Membership in the peripatetic Flying Circus kept Jasta 4 on the move, as they moved from hot spot to hot spot. During 1918, the Jasta operated for the fronts of 2 Armee, 6 Armee, 7 Armee, and 17 Armee. They ended the war on the 5 Armee front. Royal Prussian Jagdstaffel 4 passed into history on 16 November 1918, when it was disbanded at FEA 9, Darmstadt.

== Commanding officers ==
The following served as Staffelführer of Jasta 4:

- Hauptmann Rudolf Berthold: 25 August 1916 – 28 August 1916
- Oberleutnant Hans Joachim Buddecke: 28 August 1916 – 14 December 1916
- Oberleutnant Ernst Freiherr von Althaus: 14 December 1916 – February 1917
- Leutnant Wilhelm Frankl: February 1917 – 8 April 1917
- Oberleutnant Kurt-Bertram von Döring: 8 April 1917 – 6 July 1917
- Oberleutnant Oskar Freiherr von Boenigk (Acting): 6 July 1917 – 25 July 1917
- Oberleutnant Kurt von Döring: 25 July 1917 – 6 September 1917
- Oberleutnant Oskar von Boenigk (Acting): 6 September 1917 – 23 October 1917
- Oberleutnant Kurt von Döring: 23 October 1917 – 12 December 1917
- Leutnant de Reserves Kurt Wüsthoff (Acting): 12 December 1917 – 20 December 1917
- Oberleutnant Kurt von Döring: 20 December 1917 – 19 January 1918
- Leutnant de Reserves Kurt Wüsthoff: 19 January 1918 – 16 March 1918
- Leutnant Hans-Georg von der Osten: 16 March 1918 – 28 March 1918
- Leutnant de Reserves Johannes Janzen: 28 March 1918 – 3 May 1918
- Leutnant Viktor von Pressentin von Rautter (Acting): 4 May 1918 – 20 May 1918
- Leutnant de Reserves Ernst Udet: 20 May 1918 – 14 August 1918
- Leutnant de Reserves Egon Koepsch (Acting): 14 August 1918 – 19 September 1918
- Oberleutnant de Reserves Ernst Udet: 19 September 1918 – 22 October 1918
- Leutnant de Reserves Heinrich Maushake (Acting) : 22 October 1918 – 3 November 1918 (WIA)
- Leutnant de Reserves Egon Koepsch (Acting): 3 November 1918 – 11 November 1918

== Duty stations (airfields) ==
- Vaux: 25 August 1916 – 31 August 1916
- Roupy: 1 September 1916 – 11 December 1916
- Xivry-Circourt: 12 December 1916 – 9 February 1917
- Le Catelet: 10 February 1917 – 23 February 1917
- Douai: 24 February 1917 – 31 May 1917
- Ceune-Courtrai: 1 June 1917 – 1 July 1917
- Marckebeke: 2 July 1917 – 20 November 1917
- Lieu-Saint-Amand: 21 November 1917 – 25 March 1918
- Léchelle: 26 March 1918 – 2 April 1918
- Harbonnières: 3 April 1918 – 11 April 1918
- Cappy: 12 April 1918 – 19 May 1918
- Longchamps, Guise: 20 May 1918 – 25 May 1918
- Puisieux Ferme, Laon: 26 May 1918 – 30 May 1918
- Beugneux: 31 May 1918 – 17 July 1918
- Monthussart Ferme: 18 July 1918 – 29 July 1918
- Puisieux Ferme, Laon: 30 July 1918 – 9 August 1918
- Ennemain, Falvy: 10 August 1918 – 11 August 1918
- Bernes: 11 August 1918 – 30 August 1918
- Busigny-Escaufourt: 30 August 1918 – 27 September 1918
- Metz-Frescaty: 28 September 1918 – 8 October 1918
- Marville: 9 October 1918 – 6 November 1918
- Tellancourt: 7 November 1918 – 10 November 1918
- Aschaffenburg: 10 November 1918

== Personnel ==
Besides the Staffelführer aces that led the squadron, a number of other notable aces served and scored with Jasta 4. They include:

- Hans Klein
- Fritz Anders

== Aircraft and operations ==
Upon formation, the Jagdstaffel was equipped with Halberstadt D.II and Fokker E.III fighters. By February 1917, it was operating Albatros D.IIs. It also operated Pfalz D.IIIs. Squadron markings during this time included black and white bands around the fuselages in addition to national markings. In early and mid-1918, it had Fokker Triplanes on strength, reportedly striped red and turquoise on wings and fuselages.

The squadron also reportedly operated, at some time, Albatros D.IIIs, Albatros D.Vs, Halberstadt D.Vs, and Fokker D.VIIs.
