= Alois Heldmann =

- Born: 2 December 1895; Grevenbrück, Lennestadt, German Empire
- Died: 1 November 1983 (aged 87); Grevenbrück, Lennestadt
- Military career
- Allegiance: German Empire; Nazi Germany
- Branch: Luftstreitkräfte; Luftwaffe
- Service years: 1915–1918; 1933–1946
- Rank: Colonel
- Unit: FA 57, FA 59, FA(A) 256, Jasta 10
- Awards: Royal House Order of Hohenzollern, Iron Cross
- Other work: Served as colonel in the Luftwaffe

Colonel Alois Heldmann was a World War I flying ace credited with 15 confirmed aerial victories (plus three unconfirmed) while he was a Leutnant. He later joined the nascent Luftwaffe in 1933 and was a flying school inspector until the end of World War II.

== Early life and service ==
Alois Heldmann's was born on 2 December 1895 in Grevenbrück, 100 kilometres (62 mi) east of Cologne. He was studying engineering until the war began. Heldmann joined the Imperial German Army on 3 January 1915, originally as an infantryman on the Russian Front. Shortly thereafter, he transferred to aviation duty.

== Flying service ==
After switching to aviation, Heldmann served in a two-seater aerial reconnaissance unit, FA 57, beginning in August 1915. He transferred to FA 59, which also operated two-seaters. In his Eastern Front dutie, he served in Serbia and Bulgaria. He transferred fronts and moved to France. He was a well experienced pilot by the time he was promoted into the officers' ranks in 1917 as a Leutnant. He joined the Royal Prussian Jagdstaffel 10 on 24 June 1917 and was given a Pfalz D.III to fly. He used the Pfalz for his first five wins, beginning 22 July 1917. He then upgraded to a Fokker D.VII, which bore his initials painted on the top wing; its nose was yellow, its tail a checkerboard. He scored steadily throughout the last eight months of the war, with his last victory five days before the war's end. Twice he rose to temporary command of the squadron, from 19 June to 6 July 1918, and from 10 to 14 August. Heldmann survived the war.

== After World War I ==
Heldmann returned to being an engineer after the war. He joined the Luftwaffe in 1933. Having risen to the rank of colonel, he became an inspector of a flying school. He served throughout World War II and was subsequently imprisoned by Allied forces until 1946. He then resided in Bad Aibling, Germany. Alois Heldmann died on 1 November 1983 in Grevenbruck.

== Honors and awards ==
=== World War I ===
- Iron Cross both First and Second Class
- Knight's Cross of the Royal House Order of Hohenzollern

== Bibliography ==
- Franks, Norman; Bailey, Frank W.; Guest, Russell. Above the Lines: The Aces and Fighter Units of the German Air Service, Naval Air Service and Flanders Marine Corps, 1914–1918. Grub Street, 1993. ISBN 0-948817-73-9, ISBN 978-0-948817-73-1.
- Franks, Norman. Albatros Aces of World War 1: Part 1 of Albatros Aces of World War I. Osprey Publishing, 2000. ISBN 1-85532-960-3, ISBN 978-1-85532-960-7.
- Franks, Norman; VanWyngarden, Greg. Fokker D VII Aces of World War 1, Part 1. Osprey Publishing, 2003. ISBN 1-84176-533-3, ISBN 978-1-84176-533-4.
- Van WynGarden, Greg. Pfalz Scout Aces of World War 1. Osprey Publishing, 2006. ISBN 1-84176-998-3, ISBN 978-1-84176-998-1.
