= Rudolf Berthold =

German fighter pilot

- Rudolf Berthold c. 1918. The clutched gloves conceal his paralyzed hand.
- Born: 24 March 1891; Ditterswind, Kingdom of Bavaria, German Empire
- Died: 15 March 1920 (aged 28); Harburg, Hamburg, Weimar Republic
- Burial place: Invalidenfriedhof Cemetery, Berlin, Germany
- Military career
- Allegiance: German Empire
- Branch: Luftstreitkräfte
- Service years: 1910–1919
- Rank: Hauptmann (Captain)
- Nickname: "Iron Eagle"
- Unit: FFA 23,
- Commands: KEK Vaux, Jagdstaffel 4, Jagdstaffel 14, Jagdstaffel 18, Jagdgruppe 7 Jagdgeschwader II,
- Conflicts: World War I; Latvian War of Independence; Kapp Putsch (DOW)
- Awards: -Prussia: Pour le Mérite; Iron Cross: 2nd class; Iron Cross: 1st class -Saxonia: Military Order of St. Henry, Class: Knight's Cross -Bavaria: Order of Military Merit: 4th class Royal House Order of Hohenzollern with Swords

Hauptmann Oskar Gustav Rudolf Berthold (24 March 1891 – 15 March 1920) was a German flying ace of World War I. Between 1916 and 1918, he shot down 44 enemy planes—16 of them while flying one-handed.

In postwar Germany, Berthold organized a Freikorps and fought in the Latvian War of Independence. Upon return in 1920, Berthold refused to disarm and together with his Freikorps joined the Kapp Putsch with the goal to overthrow the German national government in Berlin and establish an autocratic government in its place. Berthold died of gunshot wounds during fighting in Harburg on 15 March 1920.

== Early life and entry into military ==
Oskar Gustav Rudolf Berthold was born on 24 March 1891, in Ditterswind, Kingdom of Bavaria in the German Empire. He was the sixth child of Oberförster (Head Forester) Oskar Berthold. The young child, familiarly known as Rudolf, was the first born to Helene Stief Berthold, Oskar's second wife. Oskar's first wife, Ida Anne Hoffmann Berthold, died in childbirth, leaving as survivors a daughter and three sons. Rudolf was followed by three younger brothers, two of whom survived to adulthood.

Rudolf's father was employed by a local nobleman, Oskar Freiherr von Deuster; Rudolf grew up roving the baron's great estate. Early in September 1897, Rudolf began his education. By the time he had completed his studies at the Neues Gymnasium Bamberg (New Secondary School for the Humanities) in nearby Bamberg at age 14, he had adopted a personal motto from Horace: "It is sweet and fitting to die for one's Fatherland." Rudolf moved to Schweinfurt's Königliches Humanistische Gymnasium (Royal Secondary School for Humanities) for sixth level classes. In late 1909, he transferred to the Altes Gymnasium (Old Secondary School) in Bamberg to better fit himself for military service. He graduated on 14 July 1910, with a reputation for being fearless, cheerful, and studious.

Berthold's military career began when he joined the 3rd Brandenberg Infantry Regiment in Wittenberg. He served a year and a half's training as a Fähnrich (Officer Candidate) before being accepted by its officers for commissioning as a leutnant.

Der Fliegertruppe (The Flying Troop) became an official part of the German Imperial Army on 1 October 1912. Berthold learned to fly at his own expense in 1913, qualifying as a pilot in September. He trained at the Halberstädter Flugzeugwerke (Halberstadt Aircraft Factory) on dual-control Bristol types; one of his fellow students was Oswald Boelcke. After informing his family he had a "special assignment" to a flying school, Berthold underwent military flight training during July 1914.

== World War I ==
=== 1914 ===
The outbreak of World War I disrupted the young aviator's progress. On 1 July, Berthold was recalled from his schooling to rejoin his infantry regiment. After a fortnight's refresher course in soldierly skills, he was returned to flying training. On 17 July 1914, he was officially transferred out of the 3rd Brandenbergers to aerial service. His infantry refresher course had aborted his pilot training, and he had to settle for duty as an aerial observer. On 1 August, he entrained for the Royal Saxon Air Base at Grossenhain.

By 7 August, Berthold was assigned to Feldflieger-Abteilung 23 (Field Flier Detachment 23, FFA 23), supporting the German 2nd Army. By 9 August, FFA 23 was encamped at Monschau near the Belgian border. On 15 August, Berthold was chosen for the unit's first reconnaissance mission. Two days later, his pilot strayed off-course; Bertholdt and his pilot landed, lost. They evaded French cavalry, to direct retrieval of their DFW biplane. In his diary, Berthold noted his decision to complete pilot's training.

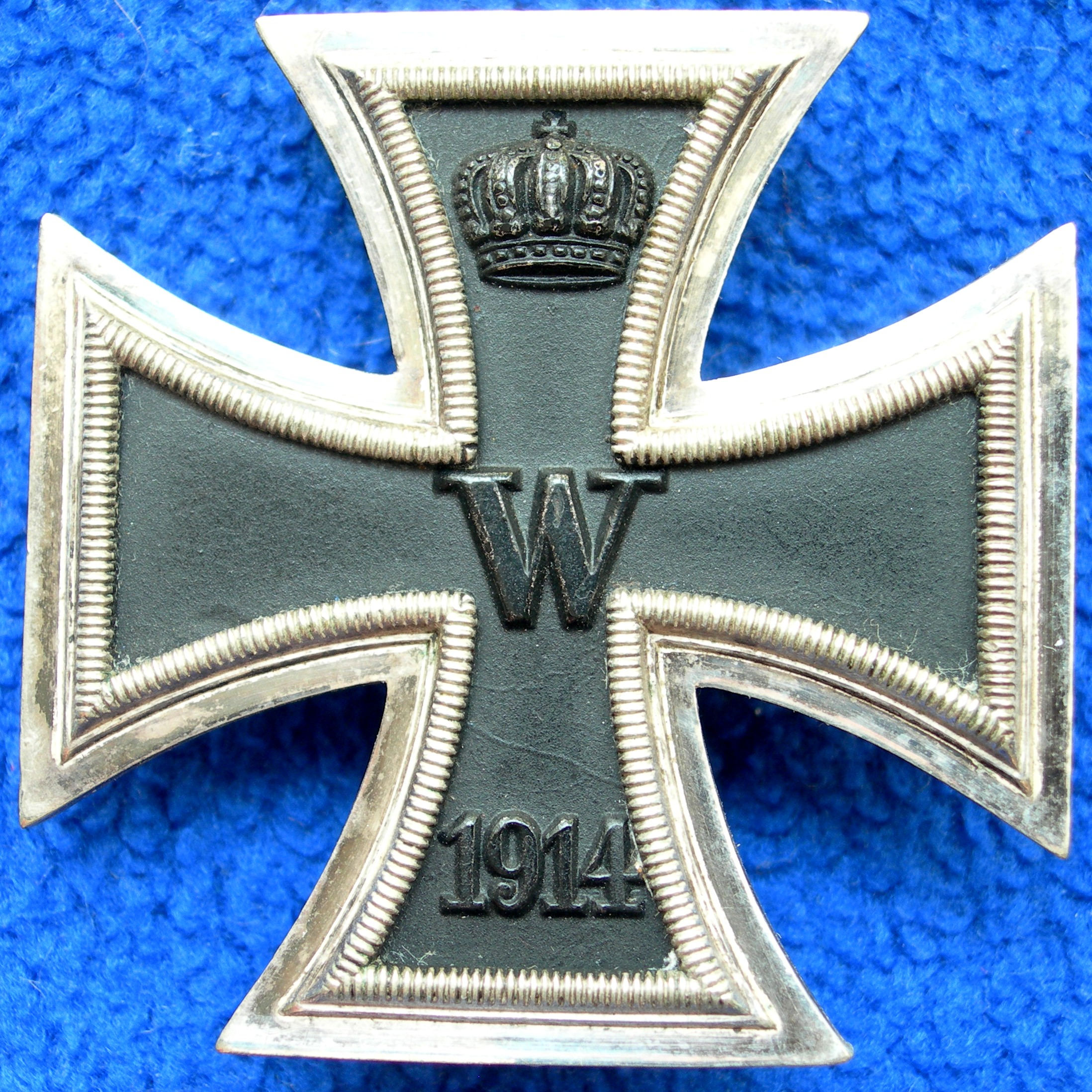
A First Class Iron Cross from 1914

Berthold was also the observer on flights on 1 and 3 September. He saw panicked French troops retreating across the Marne River. Later in the month, he discovered the French counter-thrust between the German 1st and 2nd Armies. German staff officers' disbelief led to Berthold personally briefing Generaloberst Karl von Bülow on the situation. Bülow moved his troops to higher ground; the First Battle of the Aisne began. General Bülow had received the initial Second Class Iron Cross for the 2nd Army; he personally awarded the second one to Berthold on 13 September.

On 4 October, Berthold was awarded the Iron Cross, First Class by General Bülow. Again, Berthold received his award second only to Bülow. As November's winter weather limited combat flying, Berthold arranged to continue his pilot's training at a nearby flight park. He became friends with a fellow student, Hans Joachim Buddecke.

=== 1915 ===
Berthold finally qualified as a military pilot on 18 January 1915. He arranged Buddecke's transfer into FFA 223. Berthold was assigned an observer, Leutnant Josef Grüner, for flying reconnaissance sorties; they quickly became friends. In June, they were finally supplied with machine guns for their aircraft; Berthold could cease futile assaults on the enemy with his pistol. At about the same time, Berthold was laid up for a fortnight with dysentery. FFA 223 was re-equipped with AEG G.II bombers in August. The twin-engine giant was armed with two swiveling machine guns and manned by a pilot and two gunners. The unit also received its first single-seat fighter with a synchronized gun, a Fokker Eindecker.

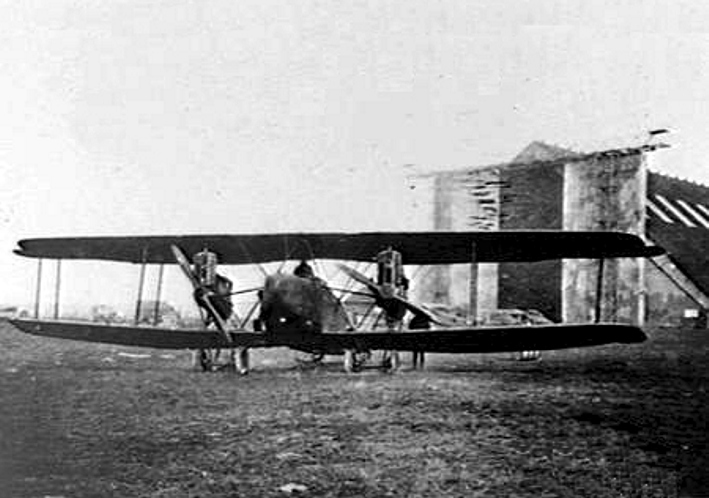
Berthold fought his first aerial combats in an AEG G.II bomber such as this.

Berthold knew he could cross the lines searching for opponents in the AEG G.II, while the Eindecker was restricted to patrolling behind German lines. Berthold took command of the big bomber, and left the Eindecker to Buddecke. This decision sped Buddecke on his way to being a member of the first wave of German aces that included Oswald Boelcke, Max Immelmann, and Kurt Wintgens. Meanwhile, Berthold damaged his original G.II in a landing accident on 15 September, and had to return to piloting an old two-seater.

Shortly thereafter, he returned to Germany to pick up a replacement G.II. By 1 October, he was using it as a gunship for air defense missions, as well as for bombing. On 6 November, one of those missions turned deadly; a British Vickers F.B.5 gunner mortally wounded Grüner. Berthold was depressed by his friend's death, and sent on home leave. In early December, Buddecke was seconded to the Turkish Air Force and Berthold fell heir to his Eindecker. He accompanied Ernst Freiherr von Althaus when the latter shot down enemy planes on both 5 and 28 December 1915.

=== 1916 ===
As the Germans pioneered use of aircraft with synchronized guns, they began to group the new aerial weapons into ad hoc units to protect reconnaissance and bombing aircraft. These new units were dubbed Kampfseinsitzer Kommando (Single-seater fighter detachment). On 11 January, Kampfseinsitzer Kommando Vaux formed near FFA 223; Berthold was placed in charge. Even as the pioneering fighter units formed, on 14 January, the British Royal Flying Corps (RFC) Headquarters directed that any reconnaissance craft crossing into German-held territory be escorted by at least three protective aircraft.

On 2 February, Berthold and Althaus shot down a French Voisin LA apiece. It was Berthold's first aerial victory. He scored another three days later. Then, on 10 February, Berthold was himself downed, with a punctured fuel tank and a slightly wounded left hand. He was rewarded with one of the 12 Military Merit Orders awarded to aviators during the war.

Berthold continued flying a bomber on missions as well as to patrol in his fighter. After he scored another victory, he was again honored by his native Kingdom of Bavaria, this time with the Knight's Cross of the Military Order of Saint Henry on 15 April.

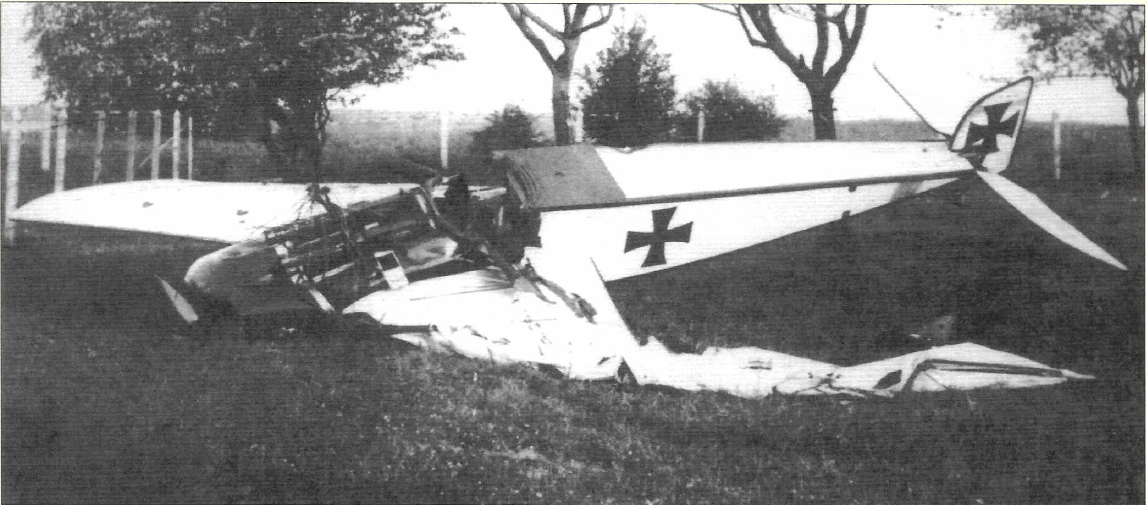
Berthold's Pfalz E.IV plane crash 25 April 1916

On 25 April, Berthold made an emergency landing after enemy bullets crippled his Fokker's engine. He took off again in a Pfalz E.IV. He reawakened two days later in Kriegslazarett 7 (Military Hospital 7) in Saint-Quentin. Besides a badly broken left leg, Berthold had suffered a broken nose and upper jaw, with attendant damage to his optic nerves. He was prescribed narcotic painkillers for chronic pain. At that time, German military doctors used three narcotics as remedies—opium, morphine, and codeine. Doctors prescribed cocaine to counteract the somnolence of these three depressant drugs. Berthold's exact prescription is unknown.

Eventually, although Berthold's eyesight returned, he was unable to fly for four months, but nevertheless remained in command of KEK Vaux. Between the message traffic brought to him, and the accounts of his visiting subordinates, he learned of ongoing casualties. His brother Wolfram had been killed in action as an infantryman on 29 April. Max Immelmann perished in battle on 18 June. After Immelmann's death, Germany's highest scoring ace, Oswald Boelcke, was grounded for fear that his loss would be disastrous to morale. In the meantime, Berthold was scheduled to be evacuated back to Germany. Instead, in late July, he commandeered a car and returned to his unit. Unable to fly, he could still command. He made his orderly help him bend his knee and flex strength back into his withered leg.

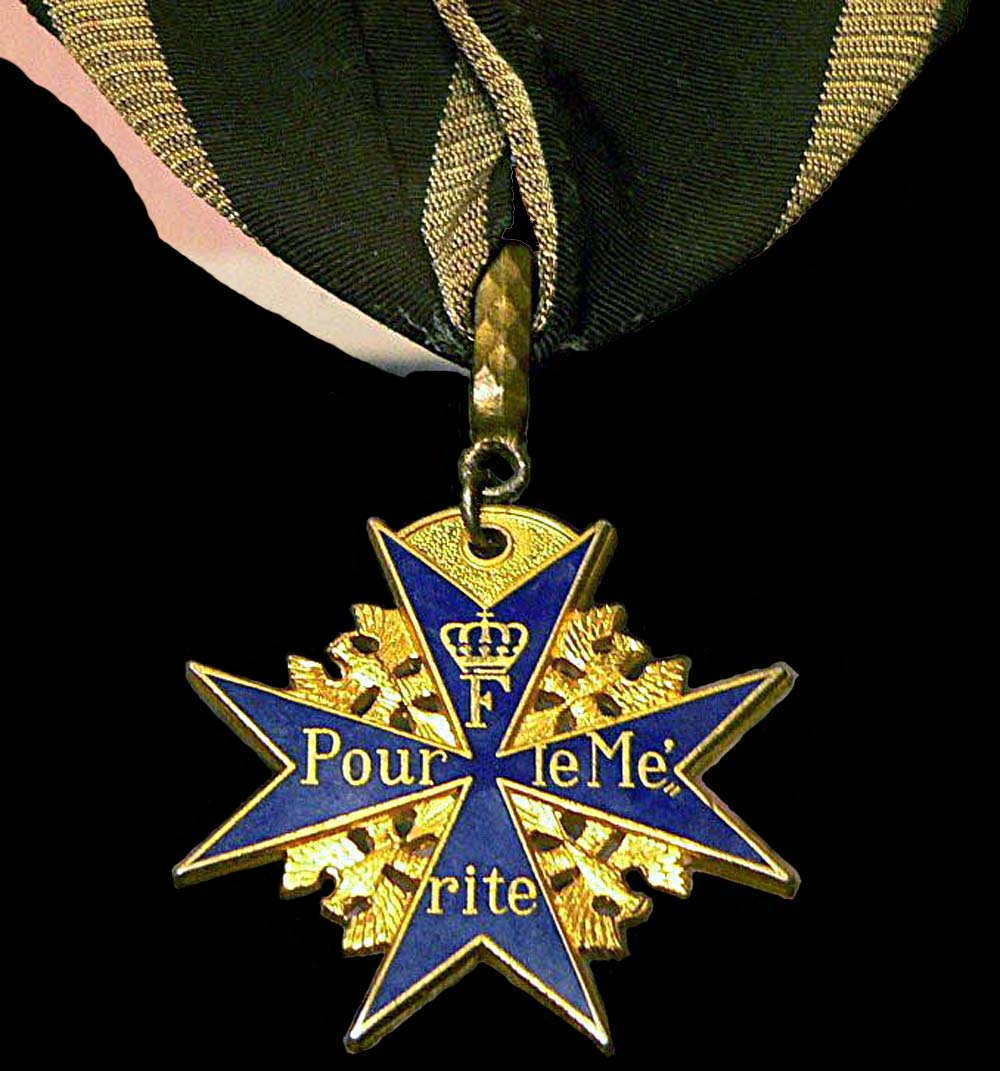
Rudolf Berthold was awarded the Blue Max on 12 October 1916.

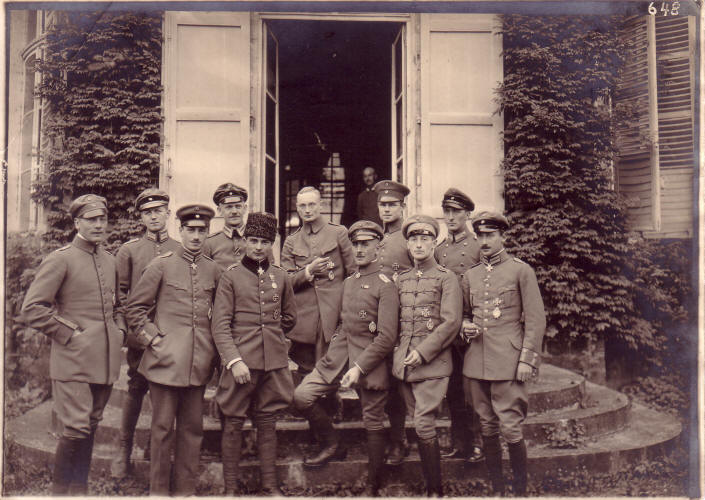
"This photo was taken to celebrate the bestowal of the Pour le Mérite to Oblt. Rudolf Berthold on 12 October 1916. From left to right are: Ltn. Alfred Lenz, Ltn. Karl Stehle, Ltn. Walter Höhndorf, Vzfw. Hermann Margot, Oblt. Hans-Joachim Buddecke, Ltn. Kralweski, Berthold, Ltn. Fritz Otto Bernert, von Althaus, and Ltn. Hans Malchow."

On 24 August, Berthold scored his sixth victory, although he had to be helped into his fighter. The next day, KEK Vaux became Jagdstaffel 4 (Fighter Squadron 4) under Berthold's command; the new unit started with a starred roster—Wilhelm Frankl, Walter Höhndorf, and Ernst Freiherr von Althaus were early members—all fated to become prominent aces. On 27 August, Berthold received the Royal House Order of Hohenzollern. Berthold was very near attaining the Prussian Pour le Merite for eight victories. After disallowed claims on two occasions, on 26 September, Berthold was finally credited with his eighth victory. He received his Blue Max, considered Imperial Germany's supreme award for valor, on 12 October 1916. His was only the tenth award for aviators. Five of the other living recipients attended the 16 October celebration of the award, including Buddecke, Althaus, Frankl, Höhndorf, and Kurt Wintgens. The following day, Berthold's was assigned as Staffelführer (Squadron Commander) of Jagdstaffel 14 (Fighter Squadron 14).

Jagdstaffel 14 was newly formed when Berthold took command at Sarrebourg, Lorraine. Its motley assortment of fighters included two Fokker E.IIIs, a Halberstadt D.II, and seven Fokker D.IIs. It had had no success when it was still the ad hoc Fokker Kampstaffel Falkenhausen. Berthold took advantage of being in a quiet sector, and trained his troops hard. He brought in new Albatros D.I and Albatros D.II replacement fighter aircraft, and renovated the officers' mess. In mid-December, following the unit's first victory, they were inspected by Kaiser Wilhelm II and Crown Prince Wilhelm.

=== 1917 ===
In January, Berthold and his squadron were subordinated to Armee-Abteilung A (Army Division A). Anticipating the future need for air protection, Berthold made an unheeded plea for amassing air power into larger units, and supported his proposal with detailed professional analysis. In February, Jagdstaffel 14 scored only two victories. However, it was slated to move to more active duty in Laon, and began to rearm with Albatros D.III fighters. Berthold flew to Laon to find there were no quarters for his men. He was adamant that he would not move his squadron until quarters were furnished. In mid-March, a convoy of trucks hauled the squadron 200 kilometers (124 mi) to Marchais, France. They began operations on 17 March.

Berthold had an Albatros D.III prepared as his assigned aircraft. Its guns were test-fired to check its synchronization gear. It was painted with his personal insignia of a white-winged sword of vengeance on either side of the fuselage. By September, his entire squadron had adopted his basic scheme of royal blue fuselages and scarlet cowlings, plus additional personal insignia. On 24 March, Berthold resumed his successful air assaults and was credited with four more victories by mid-April. On 24 April he engaged a French Caudron R.9 until driven back to base by a bullet through his right shin. This wound added more chronic pain to his misery, and caused him to convalesce at home from 23 May to 15 June. By now, his narcotics addiction was an open secret to his pilots.

From reports, Berthold determined that his squadron's performance declined, and believed this was due to the lack of in-air leadership. In early August, he returned to his old training facility in Grossenhain and wrangled a medical clearance from its doctor. Berthold returned to his unit to await the paperwork, to discover that he was being transferred to command Jagdstaffel 18 (Fighter Squadron 18) in Harelbeke, Belgium, on 12 August. On 18 August, Berthold was finally certified to resume flying. Before Berthold's arrival, Jagdstaffel 18 had had little success; their new commander promptly emphasized training even as they flew combat missions. Shortly after assuming command, Berthold again pitched his idea of using fighters en masse; 4th Armee headquarters responded by grouping Jagdstaffelen 18, 24, 31, and 36 into the ad hoc Jagdgruppe 7 with Berthold in command. He shot down a SPAD on 21 August, raising his tally to 13. It was the beginning of a string of 16 aerial victories. During September he scored 14 more victories, bringing his tally to 27. On 2 October he scored his 28th victory, his final one of the year.

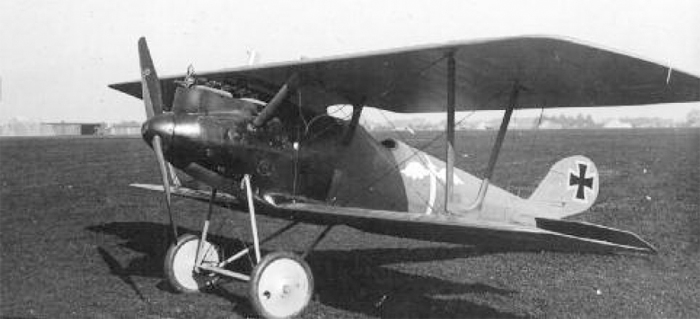
Berthold's Pfalz D. III plane

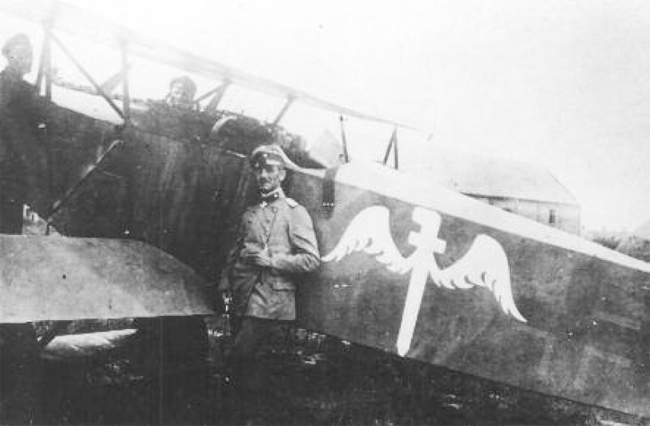
Berthold's beside his Fokker D.VII which would have been painted with scarlet cowling and a royal blue fuselage bearing a winged sword emblem.

During a dogfight on 10 October, a British bullet ricocheted within the cockpit of Berthold's aircraft and entered his arm at an angle that pulverized his right humerus. Berthold overcame the handicap of half-severed ailerons and remained conscious long enough to make a smooth one-handed landing at the Jagdstaffel 18 home airfield. He passed out after his safe arrival. His unconscious body was lifted from his Fokker and rushed 5 kilometers (3 mi) to the field hospital in Courtrai.

The Coutrai hospital lacked the facilities to heal such a complex injury; however, it sufficed to keep him alive. It was three weeks before the wounded ace was stable enough to be transferred. On 31 October, he was shipped back to Germany. His pilots alerted his elder sister, Franziska, who was a nursing supervisor in Viktoria-Lazarett (Victoria Hospital), Berlin. She arranged for her brother's diversion to the Berlin clinic of one of Germany's pre-eminent surgeons, Doctor August Bier, pioneer of cocaine usage in spinal anesthesia. Berthold entered the clinic on 2 November 1917. He was there for four months and Doctor Bier labored to save the mangled arm from amputation. Meantime, counter to Berthold's wishes, Oberleutnant Ernst Wilhelm Turck assumed Berthold's dual commands of Jagdstaffel 18 and Jagdgruppe 7. Berthold spent his convalescent leave learning to write with his left hand. He believed, "If I can write, I can fly." Meantime, his right arm remained paralyzed as it slowly healed and he remained dependent on narcotics.

=== 1918 ===
==== Return to duty ====
By February, Berthold could get out of bed. In mid-month, he volunteered to return to command of Jagdgruppe 7. On 1 March, he reported to the medical office of Flieger-Ersatz-Abteilung 5 (Replacement Detachment 5) in Hannover. He was returned to command of Jagstaffel 18, but denied permission to fly. On 6 March, with his arm in a sling, he rejoined his old squadron at its new duty station. Within two days, on 8 March, Berthold had arranged for Hans-Joachim Buddecke's transfer into the unit to lead it in the air. Two days later, Buddecke was killed in action.

On 16 March, Rudolf Berthold was transferred to command Jagdgeschwader II (Fighter Wing 2) to replace Hauptmann Adolf Ritter von Tutschek, killed in action the previous day. The new wing had been copied from the pioneering Jagdgeschwader II; it was crucial to the German spring offensive that was to be launched on 21 March. Berthold was in a tenuous and stressful situation. He had suffered the loss of his best friend, left his familiar old squadron, was taking command of an unfamiliar and newly formed larger unit, and was not on flight status. His solution to his dilemma was to take advantage of a loophole. Customarily, a Luftstreitkräfte commander being transferred swapped a small cadre of his unit into his new assignment. Berthold designated Jagdstaffel 15 (Fighter Squadron 15) the wing's Stab Staffel (command squadron). Then he effected a wholesale exchange of Jagdstaffel 18 people and aircraft into Jagdstaffel 15. In turn, Jagdstaffel 15 personnel and airplanes moved to Jagdstaffel 18, completing the trade. Berthold then departed for Buddecke's funeral in Berlin on 22 March. He returned to his new assignment two days into the new German offensive, to find that the infantry divisions his wing was supposed to support were complaining about their lack of air cover. Jagdgeschwader II's performance improved under its grounded commander's guidance, as the Germans advanced 65 kilometers (40 mi) in eight days.

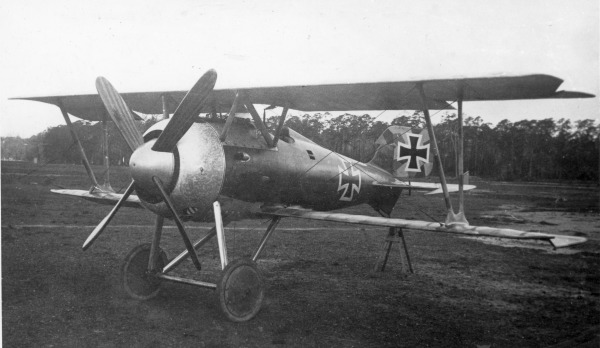
The avidly awaited but disappointing Siemens-Schuckert D.III

On 6 April, nine Siemens-Schuckert D.III fighters began to arrive. Despite high expectations for the craft because of its superior performance, it suffered engine failures after only seven to ten hours usage. The type was rapidly withdrawn from the wing. Meanwhile, Berthold had his men begin repainting the wing's aircraft with a common background marking. The wing's craft had standard dark blue paint applied to the fuselage, a la Jagdstaffel 15. However, instead of also copying a scarlet nose from them, the other squadrons each sported their own hue on the cowlings. Jagdstaffel 12 had white cowlings; Jagdstaffel 13 had dark green ones; Jagdstaffel 19 settled on yellow. To these markings, pilots added their own personal insignia.

On the night of 12 April, French artillery directed by a reconnaissance aircraft began shelling the Jagdgeschwader 2 airfield. By the following morning the airfield and its equipment had been hit over 200 times by shellbursts. Though no one was killed, damage was such that the wing was essentially out of action for the next three weeks, as it changed airfields and re-equipped.

In the meantime, Berthold fretted,

"And I will fly again…even if they must carry me to the airplane."

He kept his sister apprised of his medical condition. On 25 April, he wrote,

"…a bone splinter protruded from my lower wound. My very capable medical orderly came immediately with a pair of tweezers, and with much skill and force, he removed it…. I passed out during this violent procedure. The pains were horrific. But the lower wound is beginning to close. Only the upper wound still festers very heavily. When the bone fragment was being withdrawn it broke into pieces, as the opening was too small and the splinter was snagged in the flesh, and so he had to probe and extract each piece."

Franziska Berthold wrote of her brother,

"…his vigor was gone. The constant discharge from his wounds and the nerve pain wore down the body more and more. In order to work…he had to be given drugs."

During this inactive stretch, Berthold outlined his intended use of the wing in a memorandum to headquarters. He outlined an air defense warning net posted forward to alert his wing, and he pleaded for a transport column to maintain the unit's mobility. Aside from this memo, he planned personnel changes in his new wing. He felt that the squadron commanders were plotting to have him replaced. By 18 May, the last of them had been replaced. The wing's score improved for that month, totaling 19 victories.

==== Return to aerial combat ====
Berthold had often flown a Pfalz D.III in preference to the Albatros D.V. In May 1918, the new Fokker D.VII entered service. Berthold borrowed one of the new machines from Jagdgeschwader 1 (Fighter Wing 1) for a surreptitious test flight. He liked its lightness on the controls, remarking hopefully that he could even fly it with his damaged right arm. On the morning of 28 May, he mounted a brand-new Fokker D.VII and for the first time, led his air wing into combat. Although it was a ground-support mission, he took the opportunity to score his 29th victory. The following day, he downed two more enemy aircraft, despite a malfunctioning gun synchronizer that nearly shot away his own propeller and caused a crash-landing. Berthold's drug addiction did not handicap him in the air. Georg von Hantelmann, one of his pilots, noted that despite his undiminished martial skills, his morphine addiction made him temperamentally erratic. Nevertheless, his subordinates remained loyal to him.

Berthold's victory tally increased by half a dozen victories during June. Meantime, on 18 June, Berthold again advised his sister of his ongoing medical problems.

"My arm has gotten worse. It is rather swollen and infected underneath the open wound. I believe the bone splinters are forcibly pushing themselves out, because the swollen area is very hard. The pain is terrific. During my air battle yesterday…I screamed loudly in pain."

He took a break until 28 June, when he scored his 37th victory. That night, he wrote his sister,

"The arm is still not good. Since the lower wound has opened up again, the pain has subsided a bit and the swelling has gone down. I have screamed in pain, sometimes frantically. It seems to have been only a bone splinter…" "...it got stuck in the old, scarred wound, then the fun began for me....as the scar popped open...the pus sprayed out in a high arc...."

His festering wound was not his only stressor. As summer's heat came on, the engines of the Fokker Triplanes of Jagdstaffel 12 began overheating, aggravated by the lack of genuine castor oil for lubrication. Occasionally, the lack of replacement Triplanes grounded the squadron, and hampered its sister squadron, Jagdstaffel 13. New Fokker D.VIIs arrived in the wing, but only sufficed to re-equip Jagdstaffel 15. By mid-June, the triplanes of Jagdstaffel 12 were deemed unserviceable. Jagdstaffel 19 had only partially rearmed with new Fokker D.VIIs. The understrength wing also suffered fuel shortages. To remain operational, fuel and lubricants were channeled to the most useful craft, the D.VIIs. On 19 June, Jagdstaffel 12 and Jagdstaffel 19 had no usable aircraft, and the wing was reduced to half strength or below. The bereft squadrons would slowly restock with D.VIIs after the triplanes were removed from the wing. Relief finally came on 28 June, when a shipment of 14 Fokker D.VIIs arrived and were divided between Jagdstaffel 12 and Jagdstaffel 19.

Berthold fought on, scoring two more victories in July. However, now that he had re-equipped his fighter wing, influenza grounded all but three pilots from Jagdstaffel 19 by 6 July. Berthold scored three more victories in early August, raising his tally to 42. On 10 August, he led 12 of his pilots into battle against a vastly superior force of British aircraft. He shot down a Royal Aircraft Factory SE.5a fighter for his 43rd victory and an Airco DH.9 bomber for his 44th. When he tried to pull away from the DH.9 at 800 meters (2,625 ft) altitude, his controls came loose in his hand. His attempt to use a parachute failed because it required the use of both hands. His Fokker crashed into a house in Ablaincourt with such force that its engine fell into the cellar. German infantrymen plucked him from the rubble and rushed him to hospital. His right arm was rebroken at its previous fracture. Rudolf Berthold would never fly again.

On 12 August, Berthold once again checked himself out of a hospital. He arrived at the Jagdstaffel 15 officers' mess coincidentally with the newly appointed wing commander. Berthold stared down Rittmeister Heinz Freiherr von Brederlow, who was senior to him, and announced, "Here I am the boss." Once Brederlow departed, Berthold took to bed, stating he would run the fighter wing from there. On the 14th, Kaiser Wilhelm II personally ordered the ace to take sick leave, and appointed Berthold's deputy commander, Leutnant Josef Veltjens, to take command of the wing. On 16 August, Berthold returned to Doctor Bier's clinic, being treated there through early October. Once his pains were alleviated, he went home to recuperate. The war ended while he was convalescing.

== Post-war ==
In early 1919, Berthold was medically cleared to return to duty. On 24 February, he assumed the command of Döberitz Airfield in Berlin. He soon had the airfield functioning smoothly when it was shut down. In April 1919, Berthold then put out a call for volunteers to form a Freikorps militia. Around 1,200 men joined the Fränkische Bauern-Detachment Eiserne Schar Berthold (Franconian Farmer's Detachment: Iron Troop Berthold), mostly from his native Franconia. They were trained by late May. The government under president Friedrich Ebert utilized the Freikorps units to quell socialist and communist uprisings, such as against members of the Spartacus League. In August, Berthold's Freikorps moved to fight in the Baltic states. In September, the Freikorps became part of the Iron Division in Lithuania. Contrary to the Entente's intention to reinforce the attack on the Bolsheviks, the German Freikorps units pursued their own political objectives aimed at overthrowing the Latvian government of Kārlis Ulmanis (1877-1942) in Riga, establishing German supremacy and their own state. The Freikorps' Eastern campaigns were characterised by anti-Slavic racism and excesses of violence towards civilians who were suspected to be communists.

Under the terms of the Treaty of Versailles, which came into effect on 10 January 1920, Germany was required to reduce its land forces to a maximum of 100,000 men, who were to be only professional soldiers, not conscripts. The initial deadline was set for March 1920. Freikorps units were to return and expected to be disbanded. The militias perceived this as a betrayal. The last three weeks of 1919 Berthold and his Freikorps spent encamped on the German-Lithuanian border before their return to Germany.

On 1 January 1920, Berthold and his troops entrained at Memel for Stade, to the west of Hamburg. They arrived with 800 men with 300 rifles and a handful of machine-guns. They were scheduled to disarm on 15 March 1920. However, on 13 March, parts of the military attempted the Kapp Putsch with the goal to undo the German Revolution of 1918–1919, overthrow the Weimar Republic, and establish an autocratic government in its place. It was supported by parts of the Reichswehr, as well as nationalist and monarchist factions.

Berthold's men commandeered a train and crew from striking rail workers and moved to join the coup. This initially failed due to the refusal of the democratically minded railway workers in Stade to provide a train. The following day, "with brutal use of force and death threats, which also extended to the family members of the railway officials" - according to the district president of Stade - the soldiers forced the provision of a train. Slowed by doused signals along the rail line, they got as far as Harburg, Hamburg on the evening of 14 March; there they bivouacked in Heimfelder Middle School.

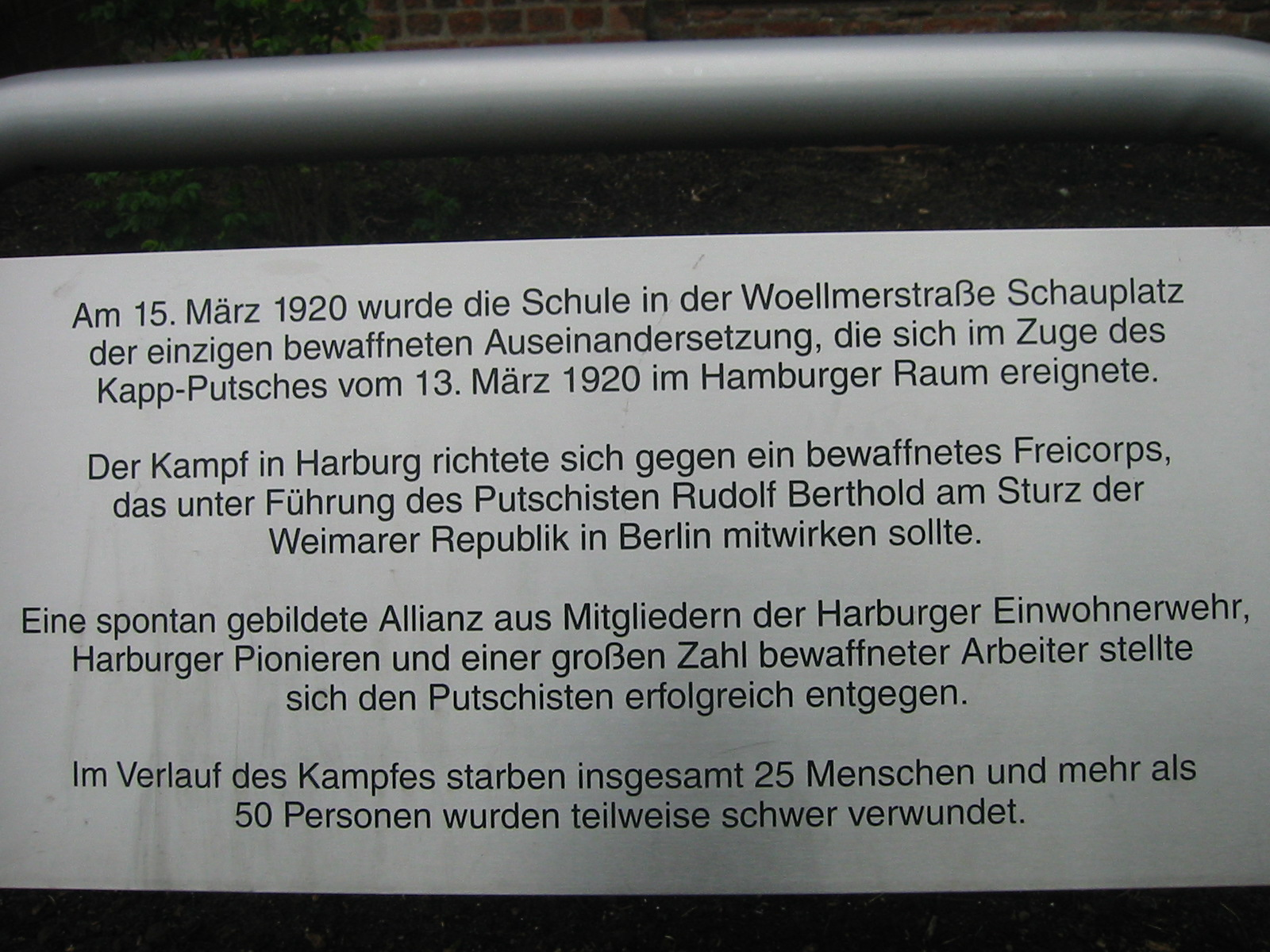
Commemorative plaque at the school Woellmerstrasse in Hamburg Heimfeld. (Note: Am 15. März 1920 wurde die Schule in der Woellmerstraße Schauplatz der einzigen bewaffneten Auseinandersetzung, die sich im Zuge des Kapp-Putsches vom 13. März 1920 im Hamburger Raum ereignete. Der Kampf in Harburg richtete sich gegen ein bewaffnetes Freicorps, das unter Führung des Putschisten Rudolf Berthold am Sturz der Weimar Republik in Berlin mitwirken sollte. Eine spontan gebildete Allianz aus Mitgliedern der Harburger Einwohnerwehr, Harburger Pionieren und einer großen Zahl bewaffneter Arbeiter stellte sich den Putschisten erfolgreich entgegen. Im Verlauf des Kampfes starben insgesamt 25 Menschen und mehr als 50 Personen wurden teilweise schwer verwundet. Translation: On 15 March 1920 the school in the Woellmer street was the scene of the only armed conflict which occurred in the course of the Kapp Putsch of 13 March 1920 in the Hamburg area. The fight in Harburg was targeted against an armed Freicorps, which participated under the leadership of the rebel Rudolf Berthold in an attempt to overthrow the Weimar Republic in Berlin. A spontaneously formed alliance of members of the military population of Harburg, Harburg pioneers and a large number of armed workers successfully turned against the rebels. During the course of the battle a total of 25 people died and more than 50 people were wounded, some seriously.)

The Independent Socialist government of Harburg anticipated the imminent arrival of the Freikorps by arresting the commander of local Pionier-Bataillon 9 (Pioneer Battalion 9), the remaining 900 trained soldiers declared themselves loyal to the republic. A spontaneously formed alliance of members of the citizen's defense of Harburg, pioneers and a large number of armed workers then formed to face the Freikorps, and converged on the middle school. Meanwhile, mayor Heinrich Denicke offered safe passage out of town to the Freikorps if they would disarm. Berthold refused. After noon, when a crowd had gathered, a machine gun fired over their heads to clear an exit passage out of the school. The defense alliance shot back. In the ensuing firefight, the Freikorps shot indiscriminately into the crowd, causing civilian casualties. Several people were wounded, while 13 members of the defense alliance and three Freikorps combatants were killed. An additional eight Freikorps fighters were summarily executed after being captured. The school grounds were encircled. The Freikorps was besieged.

By late afternoon, Freikorps ammunition was running low. Calling a truce, Berthold negotiated a safe passage for those of his men who would disarm. At about 18:00 hours, the Freikorps filed out of the schoolhouse to disarm. A crowd of unarmed onlookers who had not been part of the negotiations were outraged by the civilian casualties, and they started kicking and beating the members of the Freikorps. Berthold tried to flee into a nearby pub but was dragged out by the angry crowd. He pulled a handgun to defend himself, which was taken from him and used to shoot him twice in the head and four times in the body as the crowd beat him.

According to Kilduff's biography of Berthold, his remains were taken to the Wandsbeke hospital, in a Hamburg suburb. Two of his old fliers who lived in Hamburg rushed to the hospital. They stayed with Berthold's body until Franziska arrived from Berlin. Berthold's Pour le Merite, Iron Cross First Class, and Pilot's Badge were retrieved from a garbage dump in Harburg before she arrived.

== Funeral and aftermath ==
Rudolf Berthold was buried on 30 March 1920. Although pallbearers were customarily of the same rank as the deceased, his family requested that sergeants from his Freikorps do the honors. On Berthold's first gravestone, since destroyed, was allegedly the memorial: "Honored by his enemies, killed by his German brethren". However, a literal translation of the inscription is "slain in the brother fight for the freedom of the German lands". After receiving complaints about lynch law justice, the Stade police investigated Berthold's murder. In February 1921, two men were tried and acquitted of the killing.

== Legacy ==
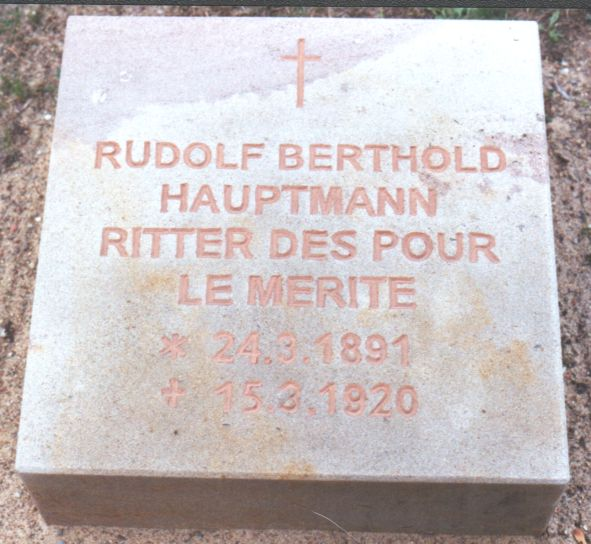
The new grave stone on the Invalids' Cemetery.

When the Nazis rose to power, Berthold was celebrated as a martyr. City streets were named for him in Bamberg and Wittenberg, among others. In addition, various myths started circulated about his death. Such as that Berthold was strangled with the ribbon of his Pour le Merite or that he was decapitated, highlighting the supposed brutality of the defenders of the republic. Another example of this posthumus martyrization is the account of Hans Wittmann, member of the Freikorps:

In the dirt of the street lay, lifeless, Hauptmann Berthold, his shoes and his overcoat robbed from him, his face crushed into a formless mass by the mob's feet, his paralyzed arm torn out of its socket, his bloody body punctured by gunshot wounds...

After 1945, the streets lost the Berthold name. The Invalidenfriedhof lay near the dividing line between East Berlin and West Berlin. According to Peter Kilduff, Tombstones were removed from many graves in 1960, including Berthold's, so that communist border guards preventing escapes from East Berlin had a better view of the boundary. Berthold's stone disappeared. However, after Germany's reunification, private donors raised the funds for a simple marker to be placed on his grave in 2003.

== Honors and awards ==
- Prussian Iron Cross
  - 13 September 1914: Second Class award
  - 4 October 1914: First Class award
- 18 January 1915: Prussian military pilot badge
- 29 February 1916: Bavarian Military Merit Order, 4th class
- 8 April 1916: Saxony's Knight's Cross of the Military Order of Saint Henry
- 27 August 1916: Prussia's Knight's Cross with Swords of the House Order of Hohenzollern
- 12 October 1916: Prussian Pour le Merite
