= Fokker Scourge =

Period of aerial battle of the First World War

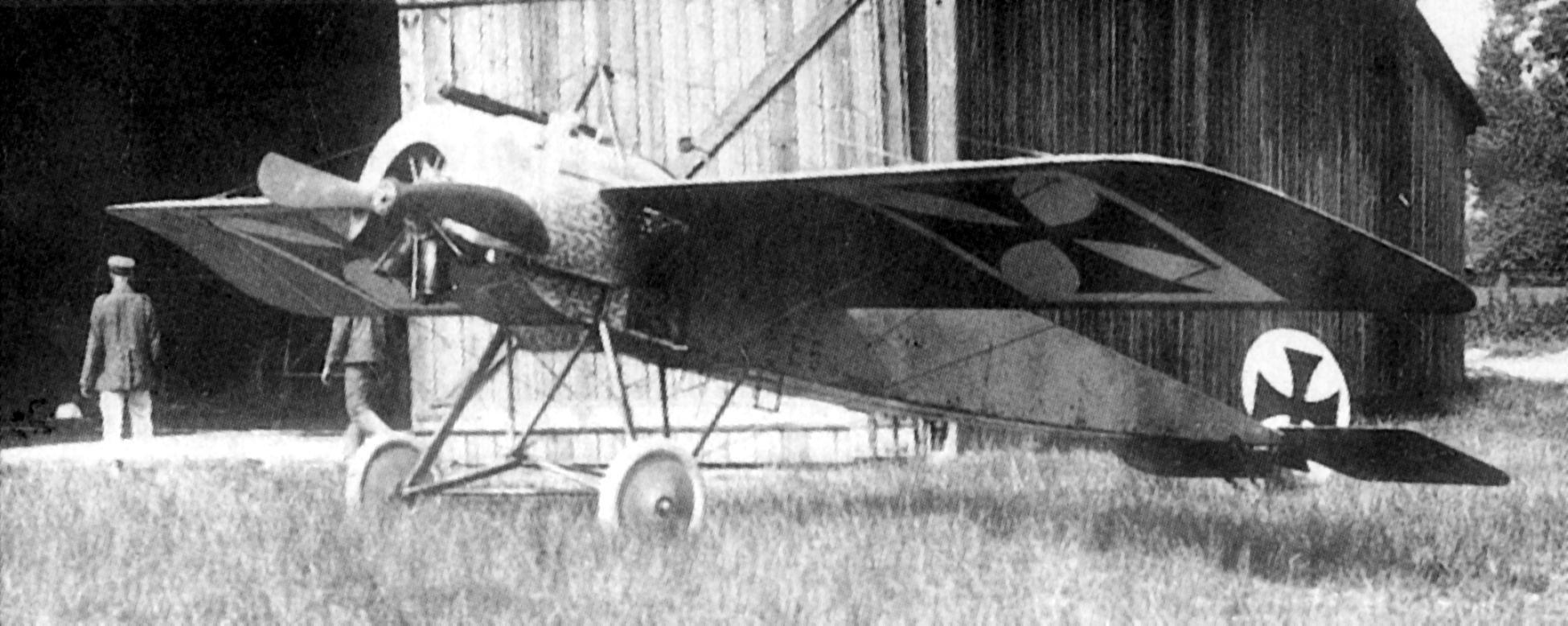
Kurt Wintgens' Fokker M.5K/MG "E.5/15" Eindecker, flown by him on 1 July 1915, in the first successful aerial engagement in an aircraft fitted with a synchronised machine gun

The Fokker Scourge (Fokker Scare) occurred during the First World War from July 1915 to early 1916. Imperial German Flying Corps (Die Fliegertruppen) units, equipped with Fokker Eindecker (Fokker monoplane) fighters, gained an advantage over the Royal Flying Corps (RFC) and the French Aéronautique Militaire.

The Fokker was the first service aircraft to be fitted with a machine gun synchronised to fire through the arc of the propeller without striking the blades. The tactical advantage of aiming the gun by aiming the aircraft and the surprise of its introduction were factors in its success.

This period of German air superiority ended with the arrival in numbers of the French Nieuport 11 and British Airco DH.2 fighters, which were capable of challenging the Fokkers, although the last Fokkers were not finally replaced until August–September 1916.

The term "Fokker Scourge" was coined by the British press in mid-1916, after the Eindeckers had been outclassed by the new Allied types. Use of the term coincided with a political campaign to end a perceived dominance of the Royal Aircraft Factory in the supply of aircraft to the Royal Flying Corps, a campaign that was begun by the pioneering aviation journalist C. G. Grey and Noel Pemberton Billing M.P., founder of Pemberton-Billing Ltd (Supermarine from 1916) and a great enthusiast for aerial warfare.

== Background ==
=== Early air warfare ===
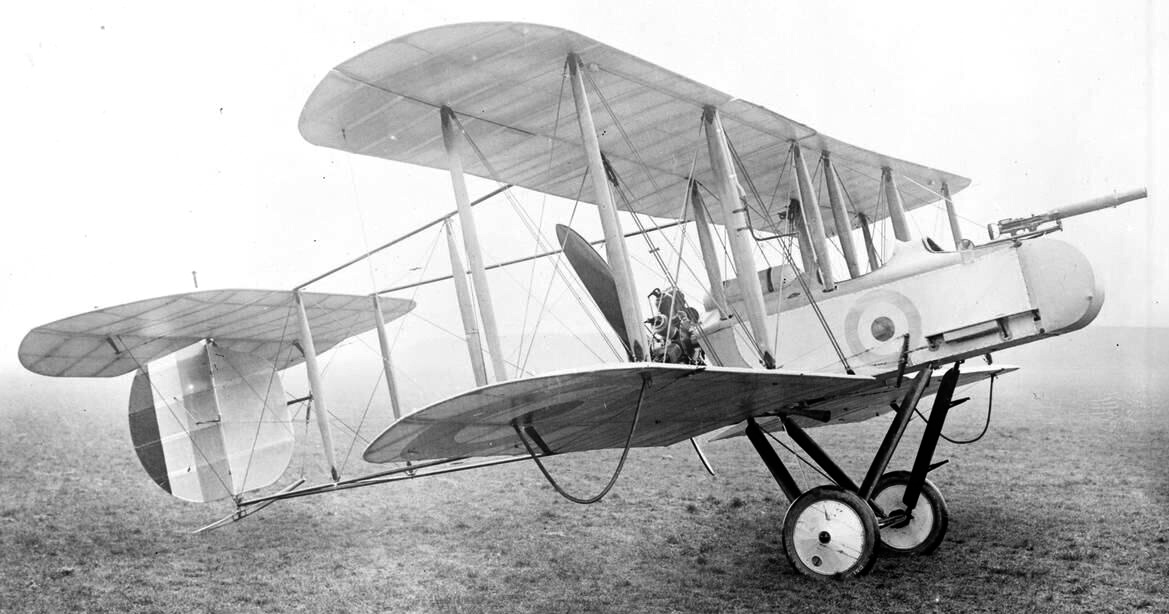
Vickers "gunbus" biplanes had the engine behind the pilot which gave an unobstructed field of fire for the machine gun

As aerial warfare developed, the Allies gained a lead over the Germans by introducing machine-gun armed types such as the Vickers F.B.5 Gunbus fighter and the Morane-Saulnier L. By early 1915, the German Oberste Heeresleitung (OHL, Supreme Army Command) had ordered the development of machine-gun-armed aircraft to counter those of the Allies. The new "C" class, armed two-seaters and twin-engined "K" (later "G") class aircraft such as the AEG G.I were attached in ones and twos to Feldflieger Abteilungen (FFA) artillery-observation and reconnaissance detachments for "fighter" sorties, mostly the escort of unarmed aircraft.

On 18 April 1915, the Morane-Saulnier L of Roland Garros was captured, after he was forced to land behind the German lines. From 1 April, Garros had destroyed three German aircraft in the Morane, which carried a machine-gun firing through the propeller arc. Saulnier had failed to develop a synchroniser and with Garros, as an interim solution, fitted metal wedges to the propeller; bullets that hit the blades were deflected by them. Garros burned his aircraft but this failed to conceal the nature of the device and the significance of the deflector blades. The German authorities requested several aircraft manufacturers, including that of Anthony Fokker, to produce a copy.

=== Synchronisation gear ===
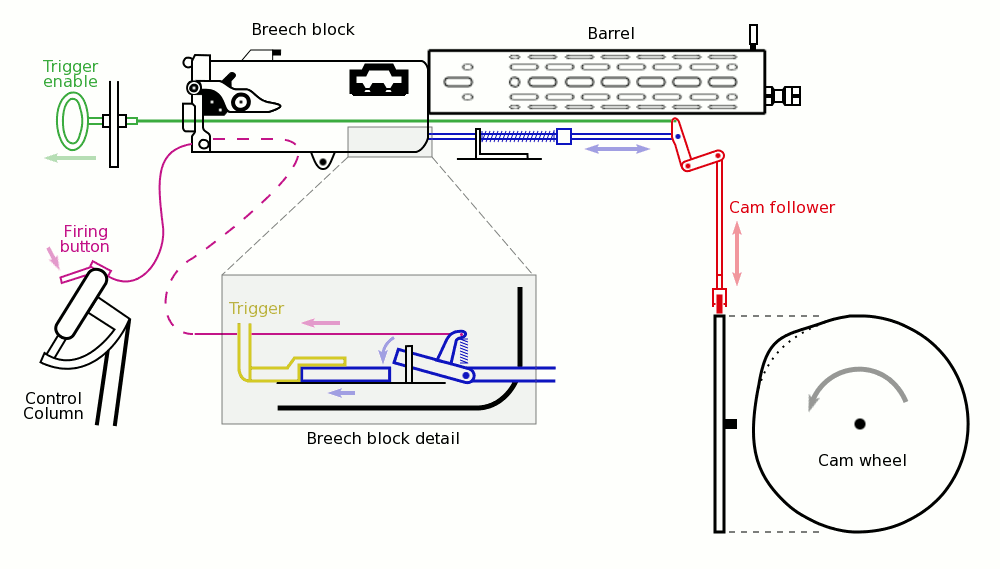
Diagram of Fokker's "Stangensteuerung" synchronisation mechanism

The Fokker company produced the Stangensteuerung (push rod controller), a genuine synchronisation gear. Impulses from a cam driven by the engine controlled the timing of the machine-gun for its fire to be limited to the intervals between the propeller blades' travel past the barrel. Unlike earlier proposed gears, the Stangensteuerung was fitted to an aircraft and proved effective. In a postwar biography, Fokker claimed that he produced the gear in 48 hours but it was probably designed by Heinrich Lübbe, a Fokker Flugzeugbau engineer. Among several pre-war patents for similar devices was that of Franz Schneider, a Swiss engineer who had worked for Nieuport and the German LVG company.

The device was fitted to the most suitable Fokker type, the Fokker M.5K (military type name "Fokker A.III"), of which A.16/15, assigned to Otto Parschau, became the prototype of the Fokker Eindecker series of fighter designs.* Fokker demonstrated A.16/15 in May and June 1915 to German fighter pilots, including Kurt Wintgens, Oswald Boelcke and Max Immelmann. The Fokker, with its typical Morane controls, an over-sensitive balanced elevator and dubious lateral control, was difficult to fly; Parschau, who was experienced on Fokker A types, converted pilots to the new fighter. The early Eindeckers were attached to FFAs, in ones and twos, to protect reconnaissance machines from Allied machine-gun-armed aircraft.

== Operational service ==
=== Service début ===
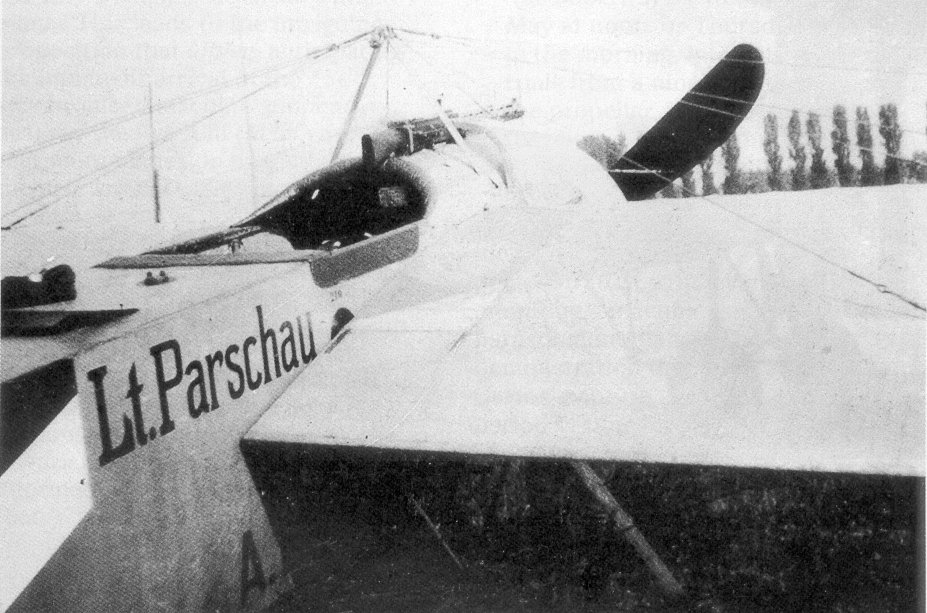
Otto Parschau's "green machine" (A.16/15, factory s/n 216) with a Stangensteuerung synchroniser; the "prototype" Fokker Eindecker.

Fokker Eindecker E.5/15, the last of the pre-production series, is believed to have been first flown in action by Kurt Wintgens of FFA 6. On 1 and 4 July 1915, he reported combats with French Morane-Saulnier L (Parasols), well over the French lines. The claims were not confirmed but research has shown that the first claim matches French records of a Morane forced down on 1 July near Lunéville, with a wounded crew and a damaged engine, followed three days later by another. By 15 July, Wintgens had moved to FFA 48 and scored his first confirmed victory, another Morane L. Parschau had received the new E.1/15 (Fokker factory serial 191), the initial example of the five Fokker M.5K/MG service test examples for the Eindecker line of aircraft, when the A.16/15 (green machine), he had flown since the beginning of the war, was returned to the Fokker Flugzeugbau factory in Schwerin–Gorries for development.

By the end of July 1915, about fifteen Eindeckers were operational with various units, including the five M.5K/MGs and about ten early production E.I airframes. The pilots flew the new aircraft as a sideline, when not flying normal operations in two-seater reconnaissance aircraft. Boelcke, in FFA 62, scored his first victory in an Albatros C.I on 4 July. M.5K/MG prototype airframe E.3/15, the first Eindecker delivered to FFA 62, was armed with a Parabellum MG14 gun, synchronised by the unreliable first version of the Fokker gear. At first, E.3/15 was jointly allocated to him and Immelmann when their "official" duties permitted, allowing them to master the type's difficult handling characteristics and to practice shooting at ground targets. Immelmann was soon allocated a very early production Fokker E.I, E.13/15, one of the first armed with the lMG 08 (a lightened version of the MG08 Spandau) machine-gun, using the more reliable production version of the Fokker gear.

=== The Scourge begins ===
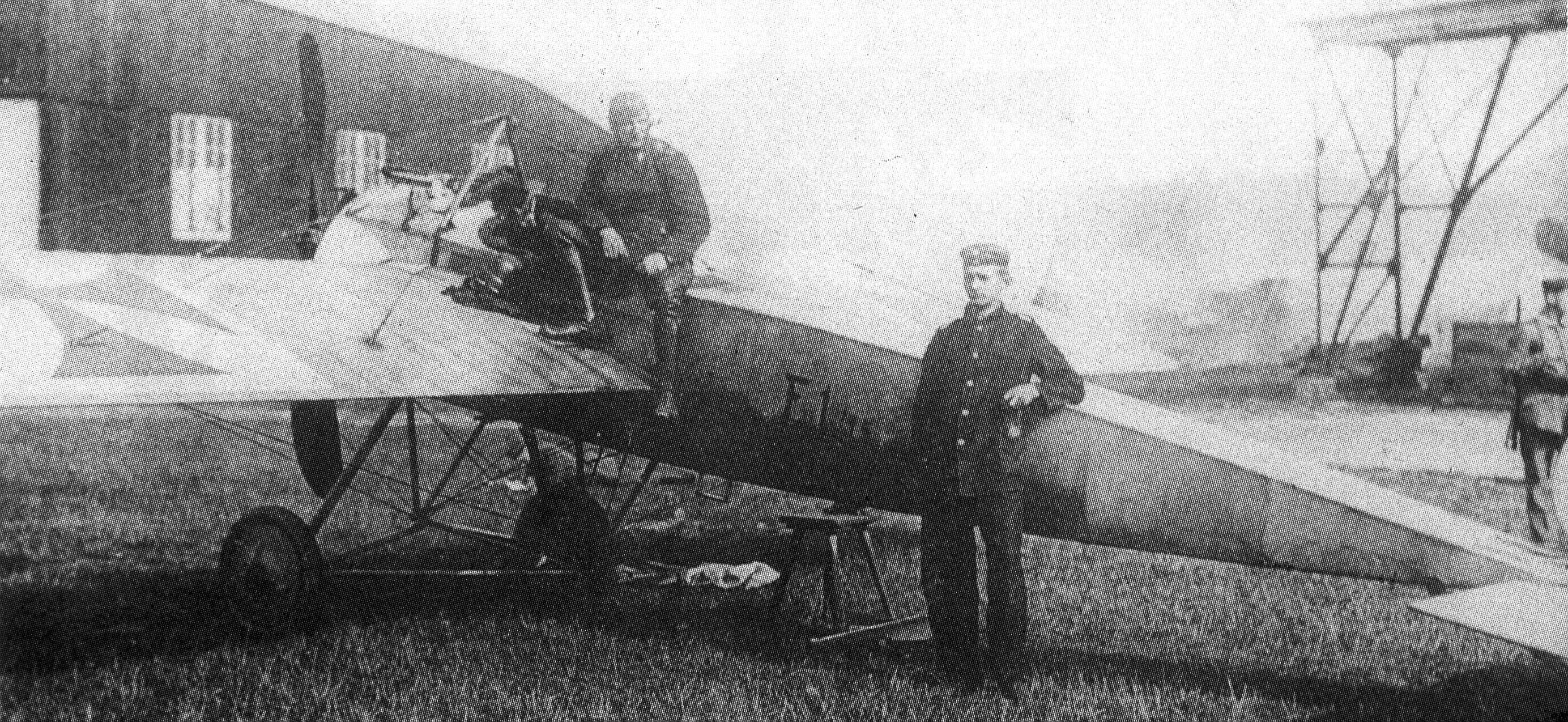
Otto Parschau's second Eindecker, E.1/15, with experimental "mid-wing" modification which became standard on production E.Is

The Fokker Scourge is usually considered by the British to have begun on 1 August, when B.E.2cs of 2 Squadron Royal Flying Corps (RFC) bombed the base of FFA 62 at 5:00 a. m., waking the German pilots, including Boelcke (most likely, still with E 3/15) and Immelmann (flying E 13/15), who were quickly into the air after the raiders. Boelcke suffered a jammed gun but Immelmann caught up with a B.E.2c and shot it down. This aircraft was flown as a bomber, without an observer or Lewis gun, the pilot armed only with an automatic pistol. After about ten minutes of manoeuvring (giving the lie to exaggerated accounts of the stability of B.E.2 aircraft) Immelmann had fired 450 rounds, which riddled the B.E. and wounded the pilot in the arm. By late October, towards the end of the Battle of Loos, more Fokkers (including the similar Pfalz E-type fighters, which were also called Fokkers by Allied airmen) were encountered by RFC pilots and by December, forty Fokkers were in service.

In the new fighters, pilots could make long, steep dives, aiming the fixed, synchronised machine-gun by aiming the aircraft. The machine gun was belt-fed, unlike the drum-fed Lewis guns of their opponents, who had to change drums when in action. The Fokker pilots took to flying high and diving on their quarry, usually out of the sun, firing a long burst and continuing the dive until well out of range. If the British aircraft had not been shot down, the German pilot could climb again and repeat the process. Immelmann invented the Immelmann turn, a zoom after the dive, followed by a roll when vertical to face the opposite way, after which he could turn to attack again.

RFC aircraft losses (June 1915 to January 1916)
Month	Total
June	6
July	15
August	10
September	14
October	12
November	16
December	17
January	30
Total	120

The mystique acquired by the Fokker was greater than its material effect and in October, RFC HQ expressed concern at the willingness of pilots to avoid combat. RFC losses were exacerbated by the increase in the number of aircraft at the front, from 85 to 161 between March and September, the hard winter of 1915–1916 and some aggressive flying by the new German "C" type two-seaters. Boelcke and Immelmann continued to score, as did Hans Joachim Buddecke, Ernst von Althaus and Rudolph Berthold from FFA 23 and Kurt von Crailshein of FFA 53. The "official" list of claims by Fokker pilots for the second half of 1915 was no more than 28, many of them over French aircraft. Thirteen aeroplanes had been shot down by Immelmann or Boelcke and the rest by seven other Fokker pilots. January 1916 brought thirteen claims, most of them against the French, followed by twenty more in February, the last month of the "scourge" proper. Most of the victories were scored by aces rather than the newer pilots flying the greater number of Fokkers. Allied casualties had been light by later standards but the loss of air superiority to the Germans, flying a new and supposedly invincible aircraft, caused dismay among the Allied commanders and lowered the morale of Allied airmen. In his memoir Sagittarius Rising (1936), Cecil Lewis wrote,

Hearsay and a few lucky encounters had made the machine respected, not to say dreaded by the slow, unwieldy machines then used by us for Artillery Observation and Offensive Patrols.

On 14 January, RFC HQ issued orders that until better aircraft arrived, long and short-range reconnaissance aircraft must have three escorts flying in close formation. If contact with the escorts was lost, the reconnaissance must be cancelled, as would photographic reconnaissance to any great distance beyond the front line. Sending the B.E.2c into action without an observer armed with a Lewis gun also became less prevalent. The new tactic of concentrating aircraft in time and space had the effect of reducing the number of reconnaissance sorties the RFC could fly.

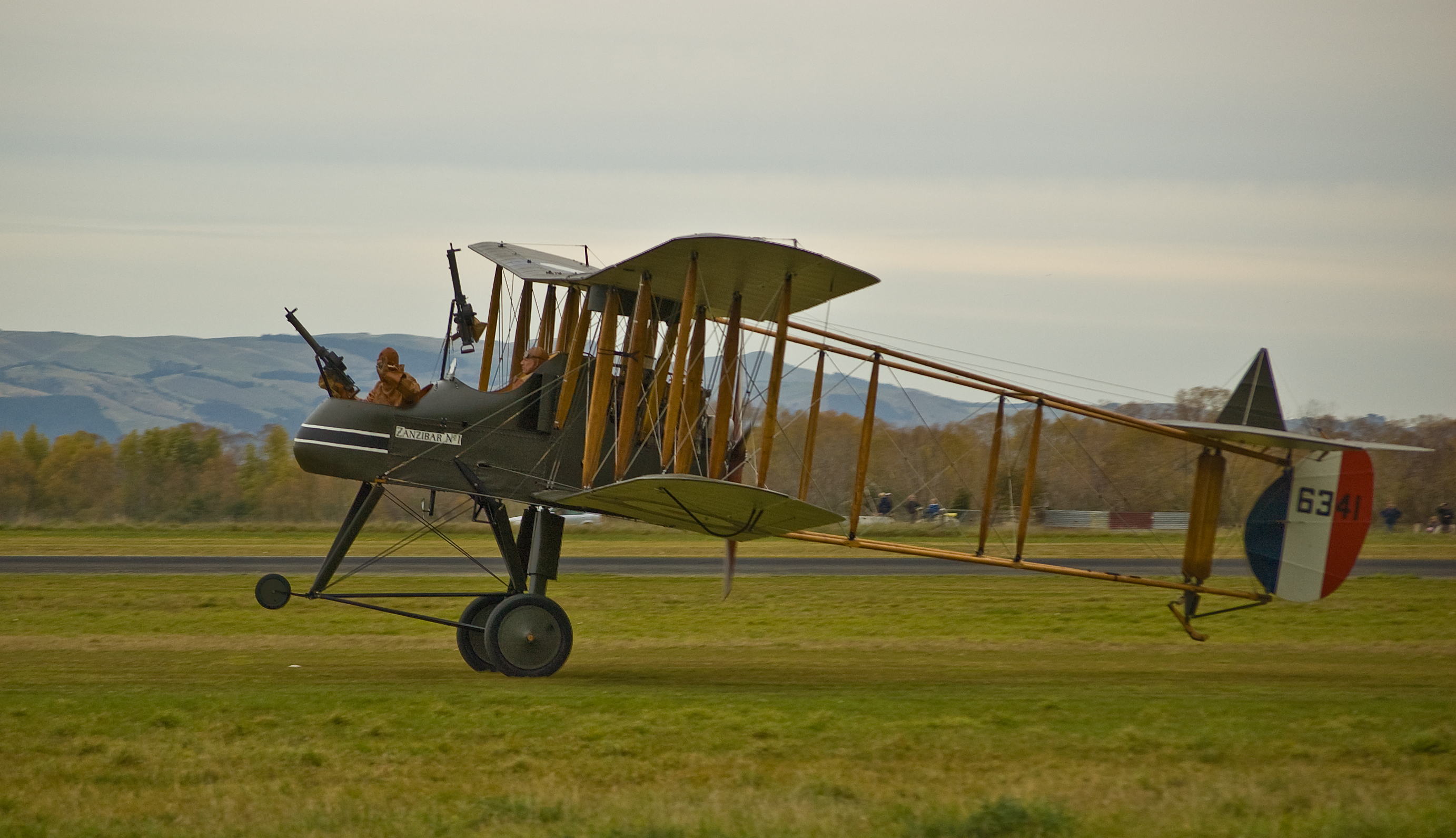
Reproduction FE2b, Masterton, New Zealand, 2009

New defensive formations were devised; a II Wing RFC method was for the reconnaissance aircraft to lead, escorted on each side 500 ft (150 m) higher, with another escort 1,000 ft (300 m) behind and above. On 7 February, on a II Wing long-range reconnaissance, the observation pilot flew at 7,500 ft (2,300 m); a German aircraft appeared over Roulers (Roeselare) and seven more closed in behind the formation. West of Torhout (Thourout) two Fokkers arrived and attacked at once, one diving on the reconnaissance machine and the other on an escort. Six more German aircraft appeared over Cortemarck (Kortemark) and formed a procession of fourteen aeroplanes stalking the British formation. None of the German pilots attacked and all the British aircraft returned, only to meet two German aircraft coming back from a bombing raid, which opened fire and mortally wounded the pilot of one of the escorts. The British ascribed their immunity to attack during the 55-minute flight to the rigid formation which the two Fokkers were unable to disrupt.

On 7 February, a 12 Squadron B.E.2c., was to be escorted by three B.E.2cs, two F.E.2s and a Bristol Scout from 12 Squadron and two more F.Es. and four R.E. aeroplanes from 21 Squadron. The flight was cancelled due to bad weather but twelve escorts for one reconnaissance aircraft demonstrated the effect of the Fokkers in reducing the efficiency of RFC operations. British and French reconnaissance flights to get aerial photographs for intelligence and artillery ranging data had become riskier, in spite of German fighters being forbidden to fly over Allied lines (to keep the synchronisation gear secret). This policy, for various reasons, prevailed for most of the war; the rarity of German fighters appearing behind the Allied lines limited the degree of air superiority they were able to attain.

=== End of the Scourge ===
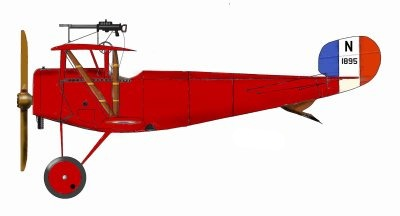
The red Nieuport 11 of Jean Navarre, Guardian of Verdun

The scourge waned during the Battle of Verdun (21 February – 20 December 1916). The Germans tried to impose an air barrage (Luftsperre) which concealed much of the German preparation for the offensive from French aerial reconnaissance. During March and April increasing numbers of the new French Nieuport 11 fighters were sent to Verdun. Organised in specialist fighter squadrons (escadrilles de chasse) the Nieuports could operate in formations larger than the singletons or pairs normally flown by the Fokkers, quickly regaining air superiority for the Aéronautique Militaire.

British F.E.2b pusher aircraft had been arriving in France from late 1915 and in the New Year began to replace the older F.B.5s. The pilot and observer had a good view forwards from their cockpits and the observer could also fire backwards over the tail. 20 Squadron, the first squadron equipped with the F.E., arrived in France on 23 January 1916, for long-range reconnaissance and escort flying. The new aircraft lacked the speed to pursue the Fokkers and had limited manoeuvrability but the F.E.s became formidable opponents, particularly when flying in formation.

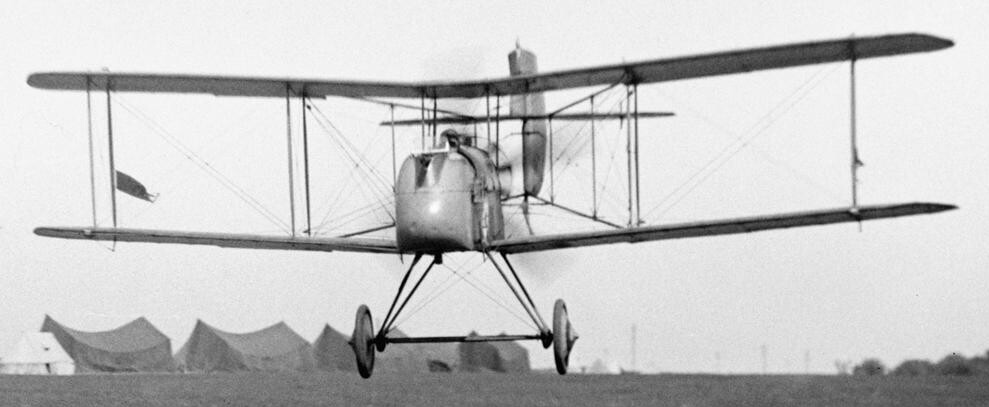
D.H.2 taking off from airfield at Beauval, France

The Airco DH.2, a single-seat fighter, began to arrive at the front in February 1916. This aircraft had a modest performance but its superior manoeuvrability gave it an advantage over the Eindecker, especially once the Lewis gun was fixed to point in the direction of flight. On 8 February, 24 Squadron (Major Lanoe Hawker) arrived with D.H.2s and began patrols north of the Somme; another six D.H.2 squadrons followed. On 25 April, two of the D.H. pilots were attacked and found that they could out-manoeuvre the Fokkers; a few days later, without opening fire, a D.H. pilot caused a Fokker to crash onto a roof at Bapaume. The Nieuports proved even more effective when the first Nieuport 16s in British service were issued to 1 and 11 Squadrons in April.

By March 1916, despite frequent encounters with Fokkers and the success of Eindecker aces, the scourge was almost over. The bogey of the Fokker Eindecker as a fighter was finally laid in April, when an E.III landed by mistake at a British aerodrome. The captured aircraft was found not to have the superior performance it had been credited with. The first British aircraft with a synchronisation gear was a Bristol Scout, which arrived on 25 March 1916 and on 24 May the first Sopwith 1½ Strutter aircraft were flown to France by a flight of 70 Squadron.

=== End of the Eindecker ===
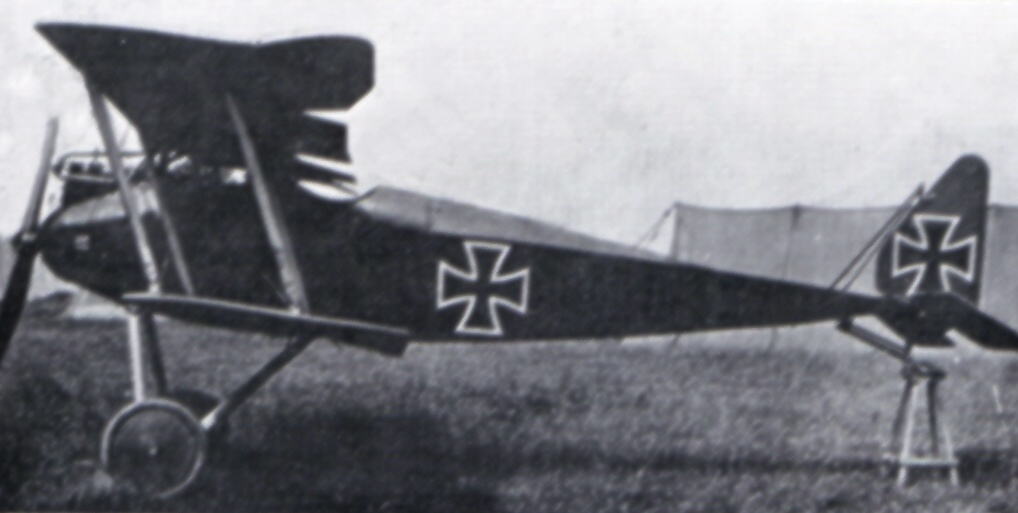
Halberstadt D.II, said to be one of Boelcke's aircraft

The effect of the new Allied types, especially the Nieuport, was of considerable concern to the Fokker pilots; some even took to flying captured examples. Idflieg was sufficiently desperate to order German firms to build Nieuport copies, of which the Euler D.I and the Siemens-Schuckert D.I were built in small numbers. New D type single-seat, biplane fighters, particularly the Fokker D.II and Halberstadt D.II, had been under test since late 1915 and the replacement of the monoplanes with these types began by mid-1916.

In February 1916, Inspektor-Major Friedrich Stempel began to assemble Kampfeinsitzer Kommando (KEK, single-seat battle units). The KEK were units mostly of two to four fighters, equipped with Eindeckers and other types which had served with FFA units during the winter of 1915–1916. By July 1916, KEK had been formed at Vaux, Avillers, Jametz and Cunel near Verdun as well as other places on the Western Front, as Luftwachtdienst (aerial guard service) units, consisting only of fighters. In late May, German air activity on the British front decreased markedly, while the commander of the new Luftstreitkräfte, Oberst (Colonel) Hermann von der Lieth-Thomsen, reorganised the German air service. The fighters of the KEK were concentrated into fighter squadrons (Jagdstaffeln) the first of which, Jagdstaffel 2 (Jasta 2) went into action on the Somme on 17 September. By this time, the last of the Eindeckers, long outmoded as front line fighters, had been retired.

== Aftermath ==
=== Analysis ===
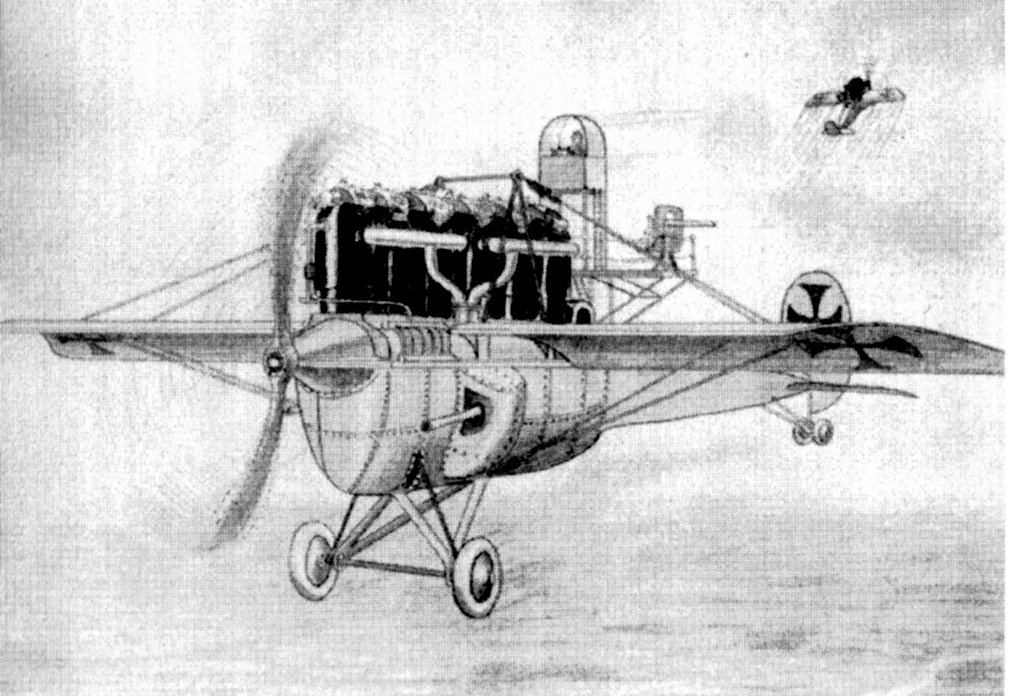
Caricature of Fokker Eindecker published in Flight for 3 February 1916, satirising exaggerated accounts of its capabilities in other publications.

Among British politicians and journalists who grossly exaggerated the material effects of the "Scourge" were the eminent pioneering aviation journalist C. G. Grey, founder of The Aeroplane, one of the first aviation magazines and Noel Pemberton Billing, a Royal Naval Air Service (RNAS) pilot, notably unsuccessful aircraft designer and manufacturer and a Member of Parliament from March 1916. Their supposed object was the replacement of the B.E.2c with better aircraft but it took the form of an attack on the RFC command and the Royal Aircraft Factory. C. G. Grey had orchestrated a campaign against the Royal Aircraft Factory in the pages of The Aeroplane, going back to its period as the Balloon Factory, well before it had produced any heavier-than-air aircraft.

Before the unsuitability of the B.E.2c for aerial combat was exposed by the first Fokker aces, criticism was not primarily aimed at the technical quality of Royal Aircraft Factory aircraft but because a government body was competing with private industry. When the news of the Fokker monoplane fighters reached him in late 1915, Grey was quick to blame the problem on orders for equipment that the latest developments had rendered obsolete. Grey did not suggest alternative aircraft, even supposing that the rapid development of aviation technology during the war could have been foreseen. Pemberton Billing also blamed the initially poor performance of British aircraft manufacturers on what he saw as the favouritism shown by the RFC, an arm of the British Army, towards the Royal Aircraft Factory, which, while nominally civilian, was also part of the army. Pemberton Billing claimed that,

... hundreds, nay thousands of machines have been ordered which have been referred to by our pilots as "Fokker Fodder" ... I would suggest that quite a number of our gallant officers in the Royal Flying Corps have been rather murdered than killed.

Even among writers who recognised the hysteria of this version of events, this picture of the Fokker Scourge gained considerable currency during the war and afterwards. In 1996 Peter Grosz wrote,

The epithet Fokker Fodder was coined by the British to describe the fate of their aircraft under the guns of the Fokker monoplanes, but given [its] acknowledged mediocrity, it comes as something of a shock to realise how abysmal the level of British aircraft performance, pilot training and aerial tactics must have been....

=== Subsequent operations ===
The period of Allied air superiority that followed the Fokker Scourge was brief; by mid-September 1916, the first twin-Spandau armed Albatros D.I fighters were coming into service. The new aircraft were again able to challenge Allied aircraft, culminating in "Bloody April" during the Battle of Arras (9 April – 16 May 1917). In the next two years, the Allied air forces gradually overwhelmed the Luftstreitkräfte in quality and quantity, until the Germans were only able to gain temporary control over small areas of the Western Front. When this tactic became untenable, development of new aircraft began, which led to the Fokker D.VII. The new aircraft created another Fokker Scourge in the summer of 1918 and as a condition of the Armistice, Germany was required to surrender all of its Fokker D.VIIs to the Allies.
