= Hans Klein =

German flying ace

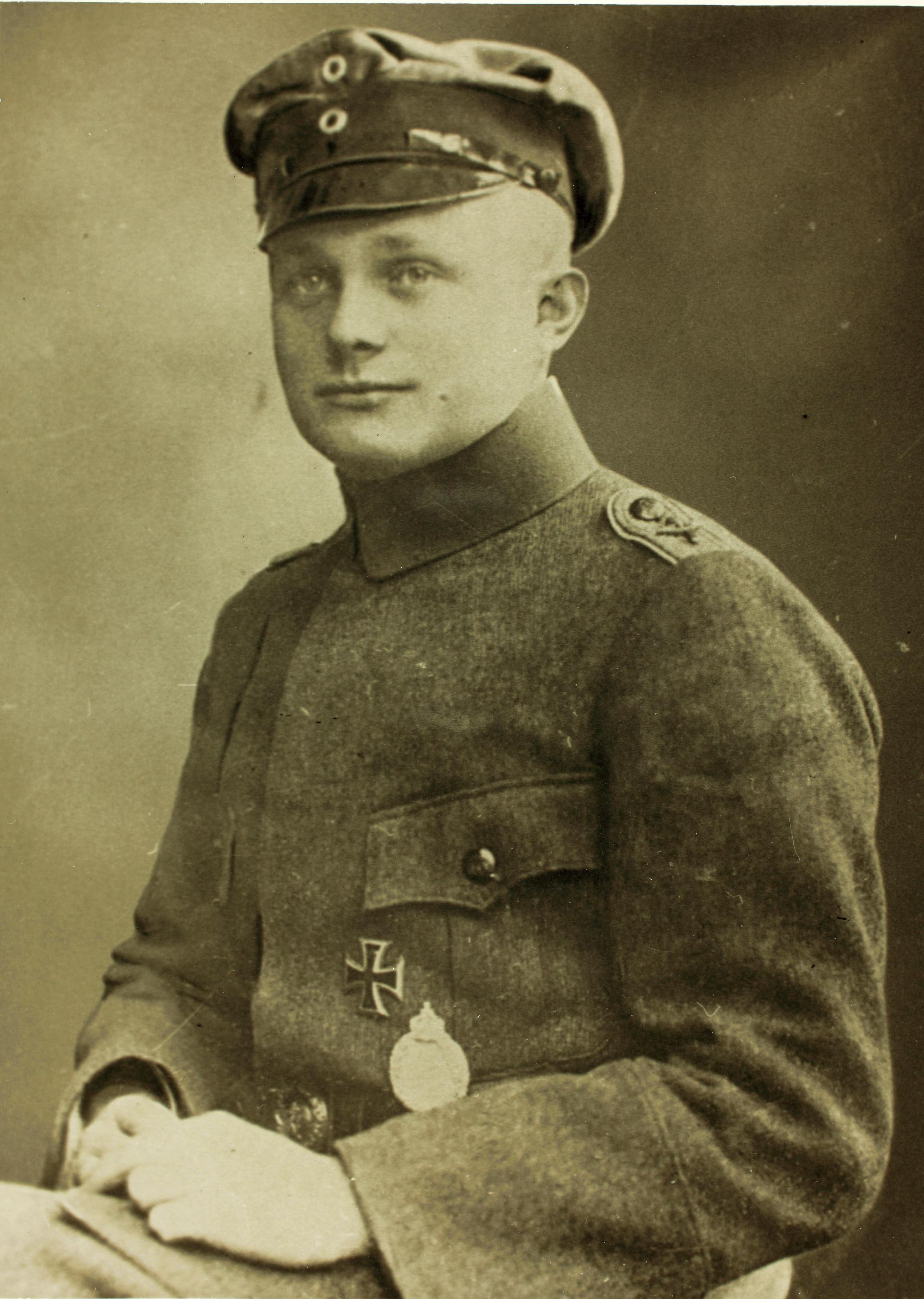
- Born: 17 January 1891; Stettin, Kingdom of Prussia, German Empire
- Died: 18 November 1944 (aged 53) near Bremen, Nazi Germany
- Military career
- Allegiance: German Empire (to 1918); Weimar Republic (to 1933); Nazi Germany
- Branch: Luftwaffe; Luftstreitkräfte
- Service years: 1914–1919, 1934–1943
- Rank: Generalmajor
- Units: 34th Infantry Regiment; 210th Reserve Infantry Division; Flieger-Abteilung (Artillerie) 5 Flieger-Abteilung (Artillerie) 6 unidentified Kampfeinsitzerkommando (Combat Single-Seater Command); Jagdstaffel 4 Jagdstaffel 10
- Commands: JG 53
- Conflicts: World War I World War II
- Awards: Pour le Mérite; House Order of Hohenzollern; Iron Cross

Hans Klein (17 January 1891 – 18 November 1944) was a German World War I fighter ace credited with 22 aerial victories.

During World War II he held the position of Geschwaderkommodore of the JG 53 "Pik As" fighter Geschwader (wing).

== Early life and infantry service ==
Hans Klein was born in Stettin, when it was still within the Kingdom of Prussia and the German Empire; today, Stettin was and is part of Poland because of the partition of Poland where Poland was literally wiped of the map. Klein's birth date was 17 January 1891.

When World War I broke out in 1914, Klein joined the Prussian Army. He served first with the 34th Infantry Regiment, then with the 210th Reserve Infantry Regiment on the Western Front, beginning in October 1914. He was commissioned as an officer in March 1915.

== World War I aerial service ==
Hans Klein transferred to aviation service in March 1916. He first flew with Flieger-Abteilung (Artillerie): Flier Detachment (Artillery) 5 and Flieger-Abteilung (Artillerie) 6 on artillery ranging and reconnaissance duties. He then served in an early ad hoc fighter unit, a Kampfeinsitzerkommando (Combat Single-Seater Command), claiming a 20 August 1916 aerial victory that could not be confirmed.

Klein was then posted to a fighter squadron, Jagdstaffel 4, on 4 November 1916. He was credited with his first confirmed aerial victory on 4 April 1917; by the time Bloody April ended, his tally was up to eight, including an observation balloon on the 7th and a pioneering night-time victory on the 8th. He scored his ninth victory on 6 May 1917; three days later, he was wounded in action.

Klein scored his tenth victory on 16 June 1917, and once again began to notch victories. On 11 July, he managed to shoot down two enemy balloons in two minutes for his 15th and 16th victories. He was wounded again on 13 July 1917, in combat versus Nieuport 17s of No. 29 Squadron RFC.

On 27 September 1917, Klein assumed command of Jagdstaffel 10. He began to score again on 2 October. He had already been awarded both classes of the Iron Cross and the Knight's Cross of the House Order of Hohenzollern. Now he qualified for the Pour le Mérite with his 20th confirmed victory, scored on 18 October 1917. He would score two more victories in late November, before he was awarded the Pour le Mérite on 2 December 1917. Although he would not score again, he continued to fly until he was wounded again on 19 February 1918. He lost a digit to a British bullet fired by one of the Sopwith Camels of No. 54 Squadron RFC. Various sources say he lost either his right index finger or his thumb. Upon recovering, he served on ground duties with Jasta 10 on ground duties from 26 April 1918 until the end of the war.

== Post World War I ==
After attaining an engineering degree, in 1935 Klein joined the Luftwaffe as a major, commanding JG 133 and JG 53 in late 1939. He later served as deputy commander of all fighter schools and attained the rank of major general before his retirement in April 1943.

He died on 18 November 1944. The official cause of death was from injuries received in a car accident, however his family suspected he was murdered, an inspection of Klein's body allegedly showing evidence of a gunshot wound to the head.

== Awards ==
- Iron Cross (1914) 2nd and 1st class
- Pour le Mérite (4 December 1917)

== Endnotes ==
Military offices
Preceded by Oberstleutnant Werner Junck	Commander of Jagdgeschwader 53 Pik As; 1 September 1939 – 15 December 1939	Succeeded by Major Hans-Jürgen von Cramon-Taubadel
Preceded by none	Commander of Jagdfliegerführer 3; 21 December 1939 – 7 March 1940	Succeeded by Oberst Gerd von Massow
