= Friedrich Friedrichs =

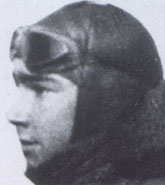
- Born: 21 February 1895; Spork, Westphalia, Germany
- Died: 15 July 1918 (aged 23); Arcq, France
- Military career
- Allegiance: German Empire
- Branch: Infantry, then flying service
- Service years: ca 1915–1918
- Rank: Leutnant
- Nickname: Fritz
- Unit: FA(A) 264, Jasta 10
- Awards: Royal House Order of Hohenzollern, Iron Cross

Leutnant Friedrich Friedrichs (21 February 1895 – 15 July 1918) was a World War I fighter ace credited with 21 confirmed victories.

Undaunted by an early invaliding by infantry combat during early World War I, Friedrichs switched to aviation. After serving reconnaissance duty, he moved to being a fighter pilot with Jagdstaffel 10. He shot down 11 enemy observation balloons, making him a top balloon buster; he also shot down 10 enemy airplanes. He was killed in action on 15 July 1918 when his Fokker D.VII burst into flames in midair.

== Early life and military service ==
Friedrich "Fritz" Friedrichs was born in Spork, Westphalia, in western Germany, on 21 February 1895. His father was a customs official. Friedrichs attended Hermann-Tast Gymnasium. He received his diploma in 1914. He was interested in a medical career.

He volunteered for service in the German Imperial Army's Infantry Regiment No. 85 on 14 August 1914. On 9 October, he went to the front. He served with them until seconded to officer training in Munich. Upon graduation on 23 September 1915, he was commissioned a lieutenant in the reserves and posted to Infantry Regiment No. 32. During its campaign in Serbia, he was hit by shellfire and wounded so seriously that he was declared unfit for further duty because of permanent damage to his left leg.

== Aerial service ==
Friedrichs then transferred to the Luftstreitkräfte. He underwent training from 1 October 1916 through 20 February 1917. He undertook aviation training at Cologne and Paderborn before learning artillery observation at Jüterbog. In June, having trained as both observer and pilot, he was posted to FA(A) 264, an artillery observation squadron. While serving with them, he won both classes of the Iron Cross.

Pfalz D.III
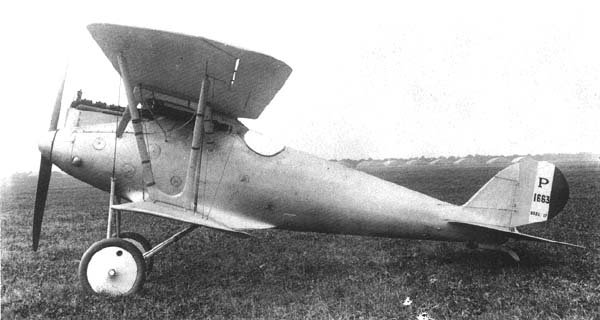
- Friedrichs flew this type without success when first assigned to fly fighters.

On 4 January 1918, he began a week's fighter training at Jastashule. Upon completion, he moved up to Royal Prussian Jagdstaffel 10, a part of Jagdgeschwader 1, to fly a Pfalz D.III.

His first claim, on 18 March 1918, went unconfirmed. Three days later, he became a balloon buster, blasting one of the floating observation posts at Ruyalcourt, France, in the vicinity of the Somme. He scored once more in March, downing a SE.5a on the 27th.

Friedrichs had no successes in April. He shot down a D.H.9 on 3 May, and a Sopwith Camel on the 15th. Three days later, he began a string of six consecutive victories over observation balloons that ended on 8 June 1918. This brought his count to ten. He ran off nine more triumphs that month, including four more balloons. He had one confirmed win, over a Nieuport 28 on 2 July, and an unconfirmed claim on 8 July.

== Killed in action ==
On 15 July, an unexpected hazard caught up with Friedrichs. His aircraft caught fire in midair. It seems most probable that the incendiary bullets loaded on his airplane spontaneously ignited and set his Fokker D.VII on fire. Friedrichs parachuted out of the conflagration, but the parachute's harness and lines entangled in the plane's tail and Friedrichs fell to his death.

Friedrich Friedrichs had already been awarded the Knight's Cross with Swords of the Hohenzollern House Order. He had also been recommended for the Pour le Mérite. Reportedly, it was awarded on 20 July, five days after his death. However, the rolls of the order do not list him as a recipient.
