= Friedrich Schumacher =

- Born: Unknown
- Died: Unknown
- Military career
- Allegiance: Germany
- Branch: Aviation
- Rank: Vizefeldwebel
- Nickname: Fritz
- Unit: Jagdstaffel 10
- Awards: Iron Cross

Vizefeldwebel Friedrich Schumacher was a World War I flying ace credited with five aerial victories.

== Biography ==
Schumacher joined Jagdstaffel 10 in March 1918 but was sidelined by illness from 4 April to 6 May, missing a month at the front. On his return he had five confirmed claims (three observation balloons and two French-flown SPADs) before being wounded on 24 July 1918.
