= Justus Grassmann =

German flying ace

- Born: c. 1895–96
- Died: 2 November 1961
- Military career
- Allegiance: Germany
- Branch: Luftstreitkräfte
- Rank: Leutnant
- Units: Flieger-Abteilung (Flier Detachment) 32; Jagdstaffel 10 (Fighter Squadron 10)
- Awards: Royal House Order of Hohenzollern; Iron Cross First Class

Lieutenant Justus Grassmann (c. 1895–96 – 2 November 1961) was a World War I flying ace credited with ten aerial victories—seven enemy airplanes and three observation balloons.

== Aerial service ==
Grassmann originally served with Flieger-Abteilung (Flier Detachment) 32. He joined Jagdstaffel 10 (Fighter Squadron 10) 10 at the age of 21, on 17 October 1917. He did not score his first win until 5 June 1918; however, he continued to score until November 5, just before the Armistice. He is believed to have shot down and wounded William Samuel Stephenson, (a Canadian pilot, code named "Intrepid" for his later work with British intelligence) on 28 July, ending his combat career.
