= Paul Aue =

German flying ace

- Born: 7 October 1891; Söbringen, Kgr. Sachsen
- Died: 1945 (after 16 April); Soviet prison camp
- Military career
- Allegiance: German Empire; Nazi Germany
- Branch: Aviation
- Rank: Oberst
- Units: Kampfgeschwader der Oberste Heeresleitung 5 (Tactical Bomber Wing 5); Jagdstaffel 10 (Fighter Squadron 10)
- Conflicts: World War I; Western Front; World War II; Eastern Front
- Awards: Kingdom of Saxony War Merit Cross
- Other work: Served in World War II

Oberst Paul Aue was a World War I flying ace from the Kingdom of Saxony in the German Empire. Partial records of his early aviation career credit him with 10 aerial victories. He would join the nascent Luftwaffe during the 1930s and serve Germany through World War II. He died in a Soviet prison camp in 1945.

== Early life ==
Paul Aue was born on 7 October 1891 in Söbringen, Kingdom of Saxony. He matured into a small man; some sources even call him "diminutive".

== World War I ==
In 1916, Aue served with Kampstaffel 30 of Kampgeschwader 5. Flying a two-seater reconnaissance plane, Aue and his observer managed to down a similar craft, a Royal Aircraft Factory BE.2c, on 25 October 1916. Aue was then credited with two more victories before being transferred to Jasta 10 that same month.

He scored his—and his new squadron's—first victory on 25 March 1917. He struck again on 7 June, wounding a British Spad VII pilot, and driving pilot and plane into captivity. Aue was wounded in action on 19 September 1917 while piloting a Pfalz D.III. During a dogfight at 3,000 meters with two dozen British Royal Naval Air Service planes from Naval 10 Squadron above Roulers, France the German sergeant ace was hit by three English bullets, one of them an explosive round. Though he refused to leave his unit, his wounds kept him out of action until February 1918; he would not score another victory until 3 May 1918, when he shot down a Bristol F.2 Fighter, killing the pilot and wounding the gunner. It would be his last victory while flying the Pfalz, as Jasta 10 was upgrading to Fokker D.VIIs.

On 16 June 1918, Aue attacked and destroyed an enemy observation balloon for his seventh confirmed win. He went on to shoot down three more enemy fighter planes, his last victory coming on 4 September 1918.

== Between the wars ==
Paul Aue joined the nascent Luftwaffe during the 1930s.

== World War II ==
On 1 November 1939, Oberst Paul Aue was appointed to command of Blindflugschule 1 of the Luftwaffe. Blindflugschule 1's ("Blind Flying School 1")'s airfield was shared with a formation of Messerschmitt Me 163 rocket planes. Aue would head the school until 16 April 1945, when the school disbanded. He was captured by the Soviet Army, and died in a prisoner of war camp.

== List of aerial victories ==
Details of Paul Aue's victories are incomplete. An attempt to collate these details and produce a complete victory list appears below.

Please include a source/citation for any additions.

See also Aerial victory standards of World War I

No.	Date/time	Aircraft	Foe	Result	Location	Notes
1	25 October 1916	Reconnaissance two-seater	Royal Aircraft Factory BE.2c	Confirmed		
2			Enemy aircraft	Confirmed		
3			Enemy aircraft	Confirmed		
4	25 March 1917	Pfalz D.III	Nieuport serial number 3418	Confirmed	Champs, France	Jasta 10's first victory
—	23 May 1917 @ 2115 hours	Pfalz D.III	Sopwith Triplane	Unconfirmed	Carvin, France	
—	27 May 1917 @ 0810 hours	Pfalz D.III	Royal Aircraft Factory SE.5	Unconfirmed		
5	7 June 1917	Pfalz D.III	Spad VII serial number B1524	Confirmed	Menen, Belgium	British pilot and aircraft captured
—	7 June 1917	Pfalz D.III	Spad	Unconfirmed	Coucou	
6	3 May 1918 @ 1215 hours	Albatros D.V	Bristol F.2 Fighter	Confirmed	Proyart, France	Aue's first victory after serious wounding
7	16 June 1918 @ 0645 hours	Fokker D.VII	Observation balloon	Confirmed	Villers-Cotterêts, France	
8	19 August 1918 @ 0900 hours	Fokker D.VII	Sopwith Camel	Confirmed	Southwest of Puisieux, France	
9	29 August 1918 @ 0955 hours	Fokker D.VII	Sopwith Camel	Confirmed	Estrées, France	
10	4 September 1918 @ 1130 hours	Fokker D.VII	Spad	Confirmed	Montfaucon, France	

== Honors ==
Paul Aue is known to have earned the following honors:

Kingdom of Saxony: Silver Military Order of Saint Henry awarded on 24 April 1917
Kingdom of Saxony: Gold Military Order of Saint Henry awarded during July 1918
Iron Cross First Class
Silver Friedrich August Medal

Paul Aue also may have been awarded two other decorations:

Saxon Honor Cross with Crown and Swords
Saxon War Merit Cross
