= Ernst Freiherr von Althaus =

German flying ace

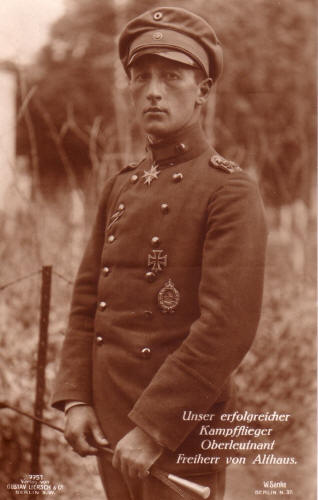
- Born: 19 March 1890; Coburg, Kingdom of Bavaria, Germany
- Died: 29 November 1946 (aged 56)
- Military career
- Allegiance: German Empire
- Branch: Imperial German Army; Luftstreitkräfte
- Service years: 1909 – 1918
- Rank: Oberleutnant (First Lieutenant)
- Nicknames: Hussar Althaus; Altstiefel (Old Shoe)
- Units: 1st Saxon Husaren-Regiment Nr. 18; Flieger-Abteilung 23 (Flier Detachment 23); Kampfeinsitzerkommando Sivry (Combat Single-Seater Command Sivry); Kampfeinsitzerkommando Jamitz (Combat Single-Seater Command Jamitz); Kampfeinsitzerkommando Vaux (Combat Single-Seater Command Vaux); Jagdstaffel 14 (Fighter Squadron 14)
- Commands: Jagdstaffel 10 (Fighter Squadron 10); Jastaschule II (Fighter School 2)
- Conflicts: World War I
- Awards: Prussia: Pour le Mérite; Royal House Order of Hohenzollern; Iron Cross First and Second Class; Saxony: Military Order of Saint Henry; Saxe-Ernestine: Saxe-Ernestine House Order; Brunswick: War Merit Cross Second Class; Hesse: General Honor Decoration
- Other work: Director of County Court of Berlin during World War II

Oberleutnant Ernst Freiherr von Althaus (19 March 1890 – 29 November 1946) was a German flying ace in World War I, credited with nine confirmed aerial victories, as well as eight unconfirmed ones. He was one of the original Fokker Eindecker pilots who became known collectively as the Fokker Scourge.

== Early life and infantry service ==
Ernst Freiherr von Althaus was born in Coburg; he was the son of the adjutant to the Duke of Saxe-Coburg-Gotha. He joined the 1st Saxon Husaren-Regiment Nr. 18 as an ensign in Grossenhain in 1909. He was promoted to Leutnant in 1911, and was serving in that Hussar unit at the outbreak of war.

At the start of World War I, Althaus led his unit into battle. In an early action, he led a patrol of 15 hussars into a French village occupied by the enemy and captured twenty-two prisoners. For this feat, on 27 January 1915, he was awarded his native Bavaria's highest decoration for valor, the Knight's Cross of the Military Order of St. Henry. In April 1915, he transferred to the Fliegertruppen and trained at Fliegerersatz-Abteilung 6 (Replacement Detachment 6) at Grossenhain.

== Aerial service ==
See also Aerial victory standards of World War I

Althaus was promoted to Oberleutnant on 6 August 1915 before being posted to Feldflieger Abteilung 23 (Field Flier Detachment 23) on 20 September. While in this detachment, he served with two other future flying aces: Rudolf Berthold and Hans-Joachim Buddecke. While serving with Feldflieger Abteilung 23, Althaus was temporarily assigned to ad hoc fighter formations known as Kampfeinsitzerkommando (Combat Single-Seater Commands), which were named after their location.

Althaus began flying combat missions in early October, flying an example of the world's first dedicated fighter airplane, the Fokker Eindecker. All three of these nascent aces were part of the Fokker Scourge.

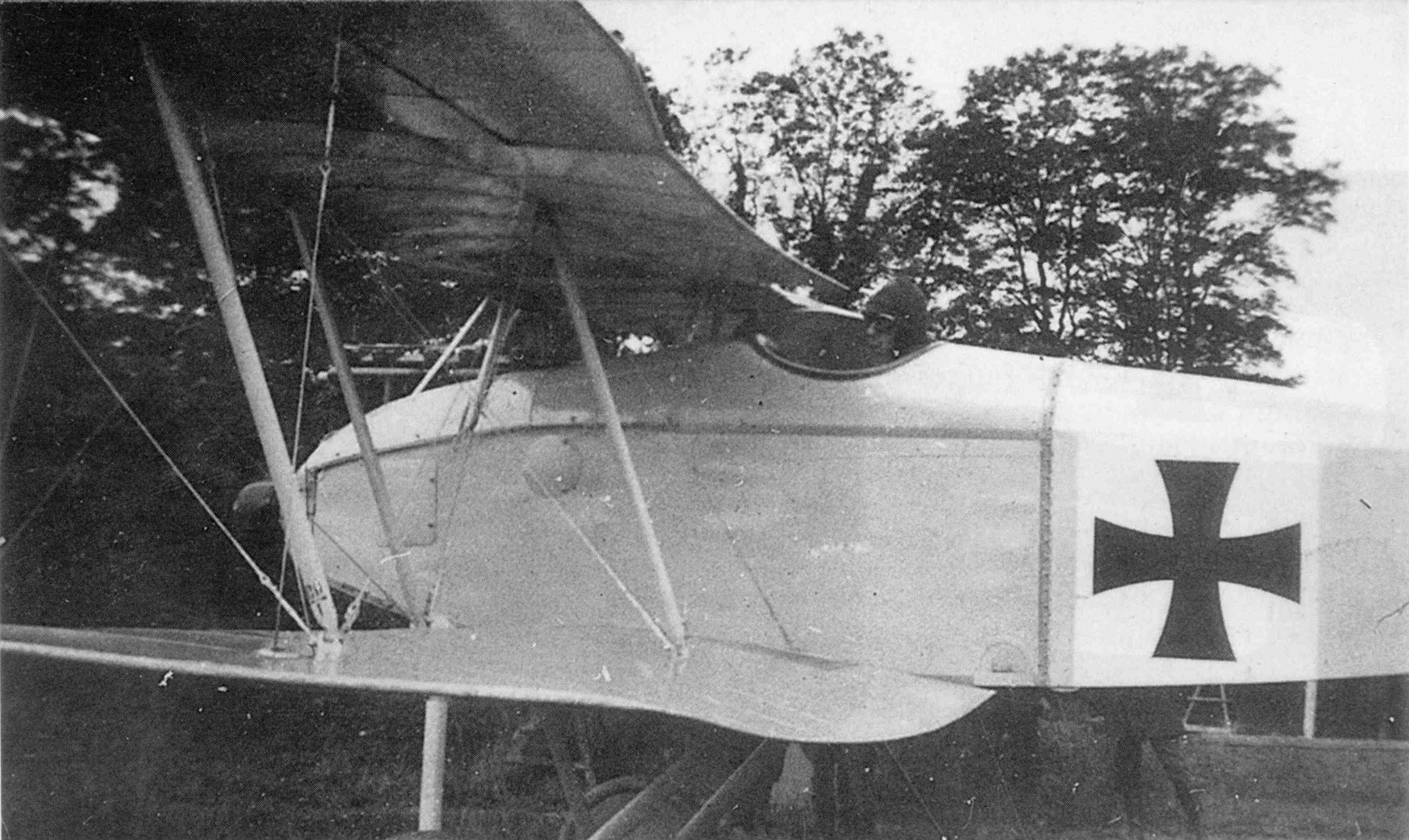
Here Althaus is seen in his Halberstadt D.II.

Althaus flew with three Kampfeinsitzerkommandos, but had success only with Kampfeinsitzerkommando Vaux. On 3 December 1915, he shot down a Royal Aircraft Factory BE.2c near Roye. In February 1916, he scored twice more, again in March, and on 30 April became an ace. He was wounded in the process. During his stay in hospital, he met the nurse who would become his wife.

During the early summer of 1916, he was awarded the Royal House Order of Hohenzollern. On 22 July 1916, he notched his eighth win, thus earning the Pour le Mérite. He continued with KEK Vaux when it became Jasta 4, and was wounded in action with them on 4 March 1917. Althaus then transferred to Jasta 14. Manfred von Richthofen personally requested Althaus's transfer to Jasta 10. Althaus took command on 6 July 1917. He made a splash, marking his Albatros D.V's chrome yellow fuselage with the five dots and a dash that denoted the Morse Code for his nickname initials of 'H A'.

He scored one last victory, after a year's break, on 24 July 1917. However, four days before, at the Red Baron's request, he had relinquished command of Jagdstaffel 10 to Werner Voss. Althaus's failing eyesight caused his removal from command and combat; he also seems to have been regarded as a scandalous gambler. He shifted to command of Jastaschule II, but that assignment was also ended by his diminishing vision. In a reversal of the usual system of transfers, Althaus shifted back into the command of an infantry company at Verdun. After a battle in which his company was reduced to fifteen men, he was captured by the American Army on 15 October 1918. He was repatriated in September 1919.

== Post World War I ==
Althaus studied law. He became a lawyer despite his total loss of vision by 1937. He did well enough that during World War II, he rose to become Landgerichtsdirektor (Director) of the County Court of Berlin. In 1945, he served briefly as an interpreter for the Allied armies. He died in the following year.

== Decorations and awards ==
- Pour le Mérite: Awarded 21 July 1916
- Knight's Cross of the Royal House Order of Hohenzollern with Swords: Summer 1916
- Knight's Cross of the Military Order of St. Henry: 27 January 1915
- Iron Cross of 1914, 1st and 2nd class
- Knight's Cross of the Ducal Saxe-Ernestine House Order with Swords
- War Merit Cross, 2nd class (Brunswick)
- General Honor Decoration (Hesse)
