= Léchelle, Pas-de-Calais =

Léchelle
- Commune
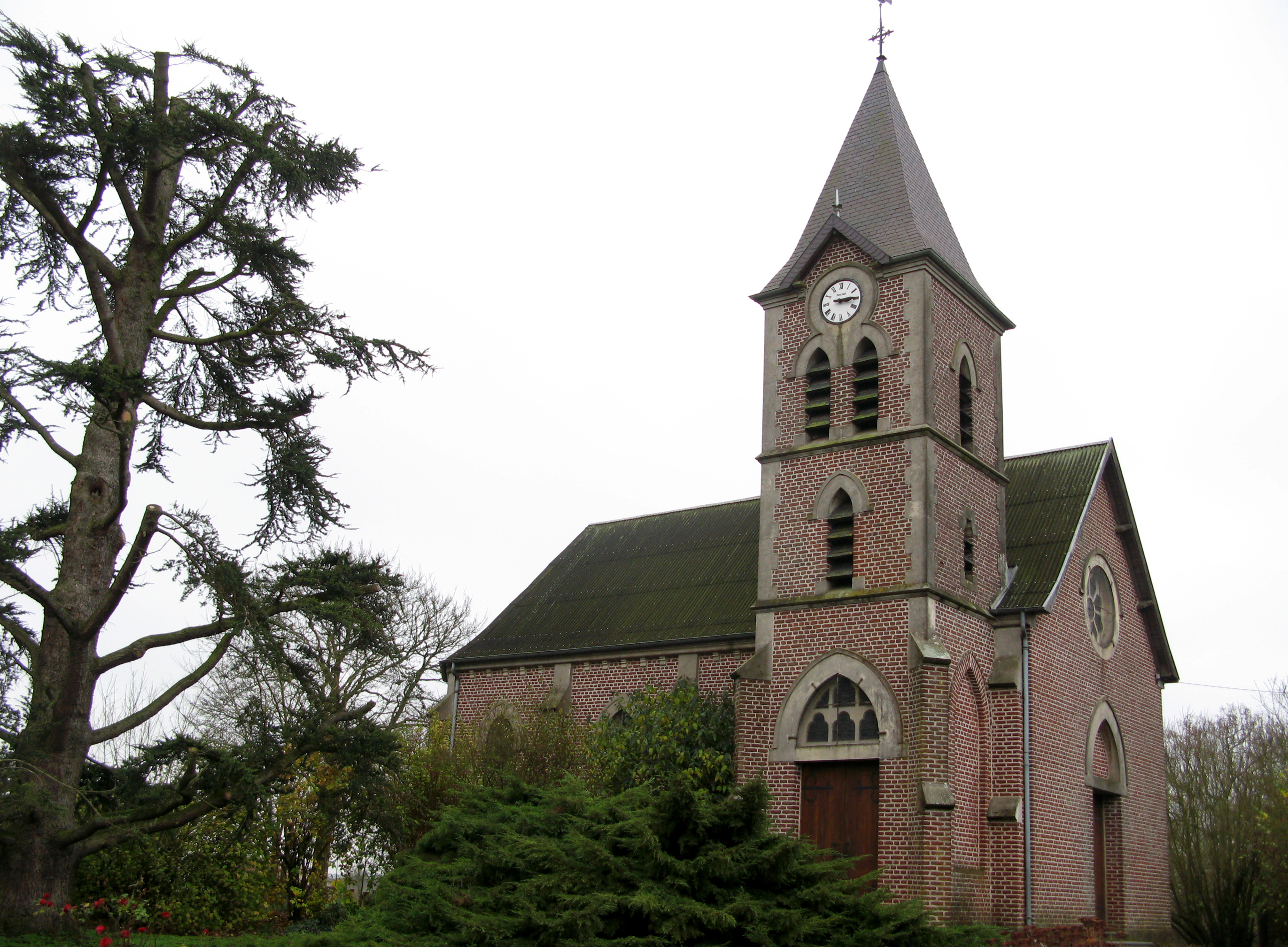
- The church of Léchelle

- Coat of arms
- Location of Léchelle
- Location within France Location within Hauts-de-France
- Coordinates: 50°03′27″N 2°58′29″E
- Country: France
- Region: Hauts-de-France
- Department: Pas-de-Calais
- Arrondissement: Arras
- Canton: Bapaume
- Intercommunality: CC Sud-Artois

Government
  - Mayor (2020–2026): Gabriel Trannin
- Area^{1}: 3.75 km^{2} (1.45 sq mi)
- Elevation: 115 m (377 ft)
- Highest elevation: 132 m (433 ft)
- Lowest elevation: 94 m (308 ft)
- Population (2023): 44
  - Density: 12/km^{2} (30/sq mi)
- Time zone: UTC+01:00 (CET)
  - Summer (DST): UTC+02:00 (CEST)
- INSEE/Postal code: 62494 /62124
- ^{1} French Land Register data, which excludes lakes, ponds, glaciers > 1 km^{2} (0.386 sq mi or 247 acres) and river estuaries.

Léchelle (French pronunciation: [leʃɛl]) is a commune in the Pas-de-Calais department in the Hauts-de-France region of France.

== Geography ==
A very small farming village situated 20 miles (32 km) southeast of Arras, on the D19E road, just a few yards from the A2 autoroute.

== Population ==
Historical population
Year	Pop.	±% p.a.
1968	77	—
1975	59	−3.73%
1982	49	−2.62%
1990	49	+0.00%
1999	60	+2.28%
2007	56	−0.86%
2012	61	+1.73%
2017	49	−4.29%
2023	44	−1.78%
Source: INSEE

== Places of interest ==
- The church of St. Nicholas, rebuilt along with most of the village, after World War I.
- The remains of an old chateau.
- The Commonwealth War Graves Commission cemetery.

== See also ==
- Communes of the Pas-de-Calais department
