= Ennemain =

- Commune
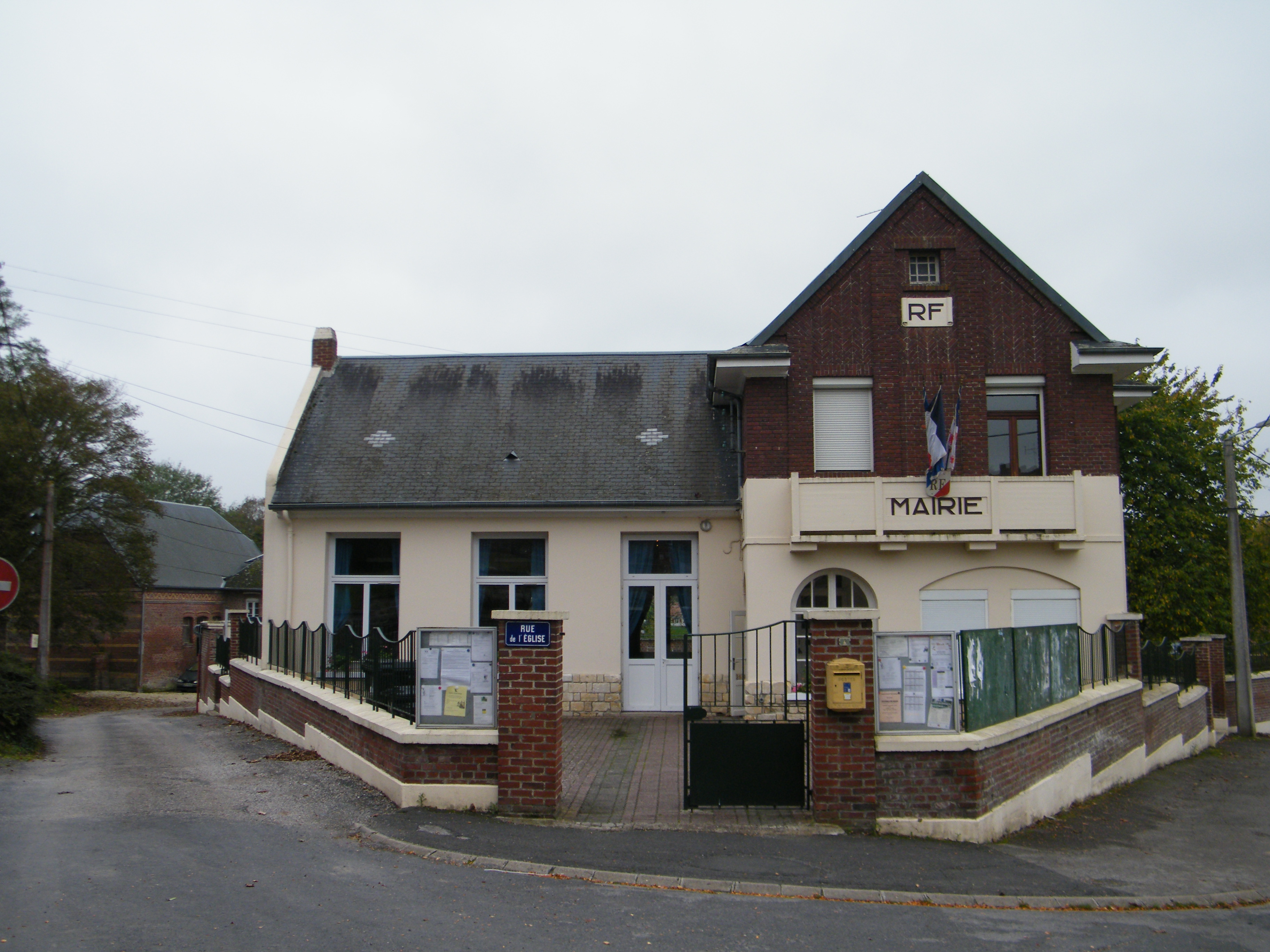
- The town hall in Ennemain
- Location of Ennemain
- Location within France Location within Hauts-de-France
- Coordinates: 49°50′50″N 2°58′01″E
- Country: France
- Region: Hauts-de-France
- Department: Somme
- Arrondissement: Péronne
- Canton: Ham
- Intercommunality: CC Est de la Somme

Government
  - Mayor (2020–2026): Patrice Grimaux
- Area^{1}: 6.44 km^{2} (2.49 sq mi)
- Elevation: 75 m (246 ft)
- Highest elevation: 86 m (282 ft)
- Lowest elevation: 47 m (154 ft)
- Population (2023): 241
  - Density: 37.4/km^{2} (96.9/sq mi)
- Time zone: UTC+01:00 (CET)
  - Summer (DST): UTC+02:00 (CEST)
- INSEE/Postal code: 80267 /80200
- ^{1} French Land Register data, which excludes lakes, ponds, glaciers > 1 km^{2} (0.386 sq mi or 247 acres) and river estuaries.

Ennemain (French pronunciation: [ɛnmɛ̃]; Picard: Ènmain ) is a commune in the Somme department in Hauts-de-France in northern France.

== Geography ==
Ennemain is situated on the D103 and D145 crossroads, 2 miles (3 km) from the banks of the river Somme, some 20 miles (32 km) west of Saint-Quentin.

== Population ==
Historical population
Year	Pop.	±% p.a.
1968	234	—
1975	232	−0.12%
1982	253	+1.25%
1990	257	+0.20%
1999	248	−0.40%
2007	230	−0.94%
2012	215	−1.34%
2017	262	+4.03%
2023	241	−1.38%
Source: INSEE

== See also ==
- Communes of the Somme department
