= Hugo Schäfer =

German fighter ace

- Born: 30 June 1894; Elberfeld, Germany
- Died: 3 February 1920 (aged 25)
- Military career
- Allegiance: Germany
- Branch: Infantry, Air Service
- Service years: 1915–1918
- Rank: Leutnant
- Units: Jagdstaffel 18; Jagdstaffel 15

Schäfer before 1920

Lieutenant Hugo Schäfer (30 June 1894 - 3 February 1920) was a German fighter ace credited with 11 aerial victories during World War I. As a member of Jasta 15 and 18, Schäfer formed a close relationship with fellow aces Georg von Hantelmann and Olivier Freiherr von Beaulieu-Marconnay, becoming known in the Jasta as the 'Three Inseparables.' Schäfer briefly became the commanding officer of Jasta 15, and survived the war only to die in a flying accident on 3 February 1920.

== Early life and service ==
Schäfer was born on 30 June 1894 in Elberfeld, Germany. He joined the military in early 1915 and was commissioned as an officer in July. He received pilot training before joining Jasta 18 in mid-July.

== Aerial service ==
After joining Jasta 18, however, Schäfer was moved to Jasta 15 during the personnel swap ordered by Rudolf Berthold in preparation for the German spring offensive. As the offensive began, Schäfer scored his first victory over a British R.E.8 on 28 March, followed by a SPAD on the 31st and an S.E.5a on 1 April. He scored 2 more victories over Breguet 14 and D.H.4 reconnaissance aircraft before being shot down by an S.E.5a on 17 June, the day that Jasta 15 commander Kurt Wüsthoff was shot down and brought into captivity. Schäfer, however, landed his aircraft behind friendly lines, and in August he had downed another Breguet, bringing his tally to 6.

During the course of the Spring Offensive, Schäfer forged a close friendship with Jasta 15's other rising aces Georg von Hantelmann and Olivier Freiherr von Beaulieu-Marconnay. Both aged 19 to Schäfer's 24, these 3 young aces frequently flew together in combat and were known among the Jasta as the 'Three Inseparables.'

From 13 September to 9 October Schäfer downed 5 more aircraft-including 3 SPADs and 2 De Havilland bombers-which brought his final tally to 11. For his final 8 victories he flew a Fokker D.VII emblazoned with a white winged snake.

== Postwar ==
Schäfer survived the war, but was killed in a flying accident on 3 February 1920. His signature Fokker D.VII was captured by the Americans after the armistice.
