= Olivier Freiherr von Beaulieu-Marconnay =

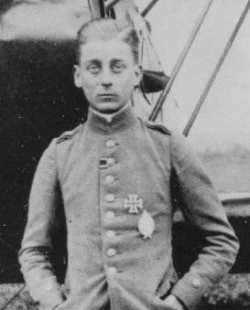
- Born: 14 September 1898; Berlin-Charlottenburg, German Empire
- Died: 26 October 1918 (aged 20); Arlon, Belgium
- Burial place: Invalidenfriedhof Berlin
- Military career
- Allegiance: German Empire
- Branch: Imperial German Army: Dragoons; Luftstreitkräfte
- Service years: 1914–1918
- Rank: Leutnant
- Nickname: "Bauli"
- Units: 4th Prussian Dragoon Regiment; Jagdstaffel 15
- Commands: Jagdstaffel 19
- Conflicts: World War I
- Awards: Pour le Merite; Iron Cross First Class

Leutnant Olivier Freiherr von Beaulieu-Marconnay (14 September 1898 – 26 October 1918) was a German World War I ace fighter pilot credited with 25 victories. Having joined the military at age 16, his success in shooting down 13 enemy aircraft led to his being appointed to command a fighter squadron, Jagdstaffel 19, at age 19. He was credited with another dozen victories before being mortally wounded. Because Germany's highest award for valor could not be granted posthumously, it was hurriedly approved just hours before his death. He is notable for being World War I's youngest recipient of the Pour le Merite.

== Early life and service ==
Olivier Freiherr (Baron) von Beaulieu-Marconnay was born in Charlottenburg on 14 September 1898, the son of an aristocratic Prussian Army captain. When World War I started in August 1914, he was a high school student, not quite 16. The following year, at 16, he volunteered as a cadet for service in his father's former regiment, the 4th Prussian Dragoons. He served with the Dragoons in Russia, and participated in fighting in the Rokitno Swamps in the summer of 1916. He was promoted to leutnant in July 1916, being awarded the Iron Cross First Class later in the year.

== Aerial service ==
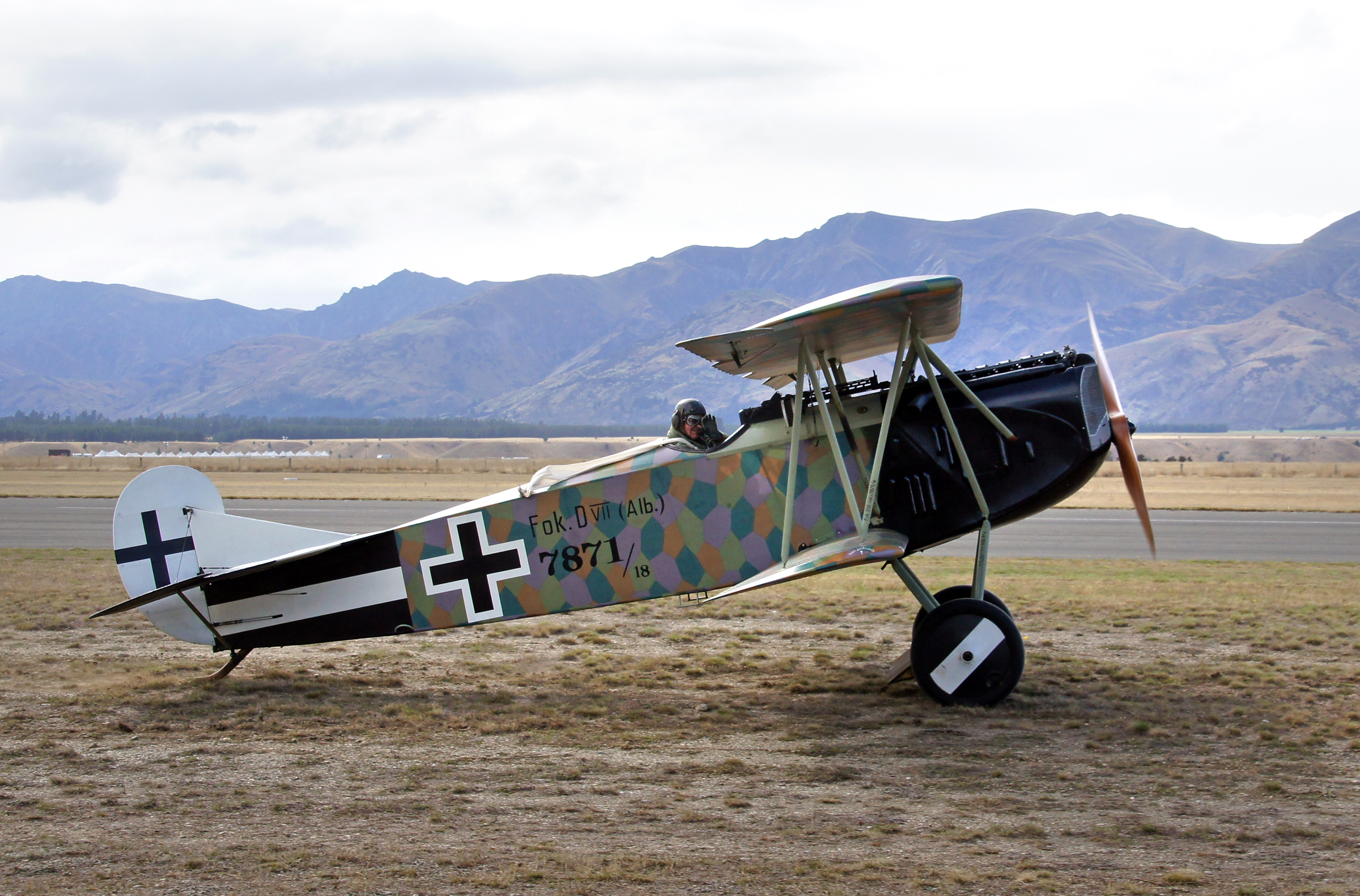
Beaulieu-Marconnay's Fokker D.VII would have borne his livery.

He then transferred to the German air service in 1917 and by November had qualified as a pilot. On 1 December 1917 he was assigned to Jagdstaffel 18. He paid tribute to the 4th Prussian Dragoons by having a personal insignia painted on all his planes consisting of a numeral 4 merged with a capital letter D. His planes also featured a blue fuselage, yellow wheel covers, and nose painted yellow back to the cockpit. Beaulieu-Marconnay served with Jagdstaffel 18 without success until his transfer to Josef Veltjens' Jagdstaffel 15 on 20 March 1918. However, he developed such a close friendship with two other teenage aces, Georg von Hantelmann and Hugo Schäfer, that they were dubbed The Inseparables.

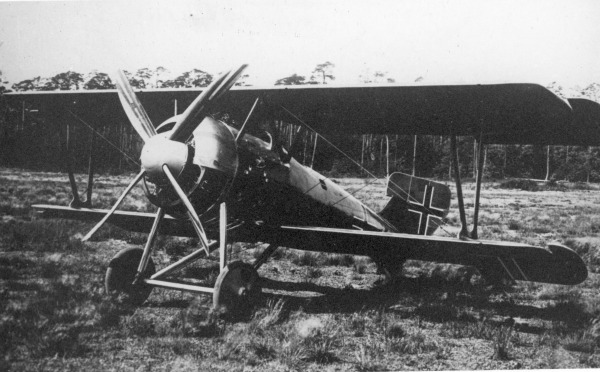
Another of Beaulieu-Marconnay's mounts was a Siemens-Schuckert D.III such as this.)

Jagdstaffel 15 had recently received the new Siemens-Schuckert D.III fighters, and were limited to defensive operations, as they had orders forbidding flights over enemy lines lest one of the new planes fall into Allied hands. However, on 28 May 1918, a formation of French Dorand AR.2s were reported over German held territory. The squadron scrambled to intercept and Beaulieu-Marconnay scored his first victory.

The following month he scored regularly becoming an ace on 11 June and a week later had run his total to eight. A double victory on 9 August made him a double ace. He went on to score three more victories in August. At some time in August, he was equipped with a much-modified BMW engined Fokker D.VII, seemingly a Berthold hand-me-down.

Despite being only 19 years old, Beaulieu-Marconnay was then appointed to command Jagdstaffel 19 on 4 September. He would begin his tenure as commander by totaling ten victories in September, and four more in October. His 25th and last confirmed victory came on 10 October 1918.

On 18 October, in the confusion of a dogfight, Beaulieu-Marconnay was seriously wounded in the thigh, possibly as a result of friendly fire from a fellow German pilot from Jagdstaffel 74. He managed to regain his home airfield and land safely, and was rushed to the hospital, bleeding freely and in very critical condition.

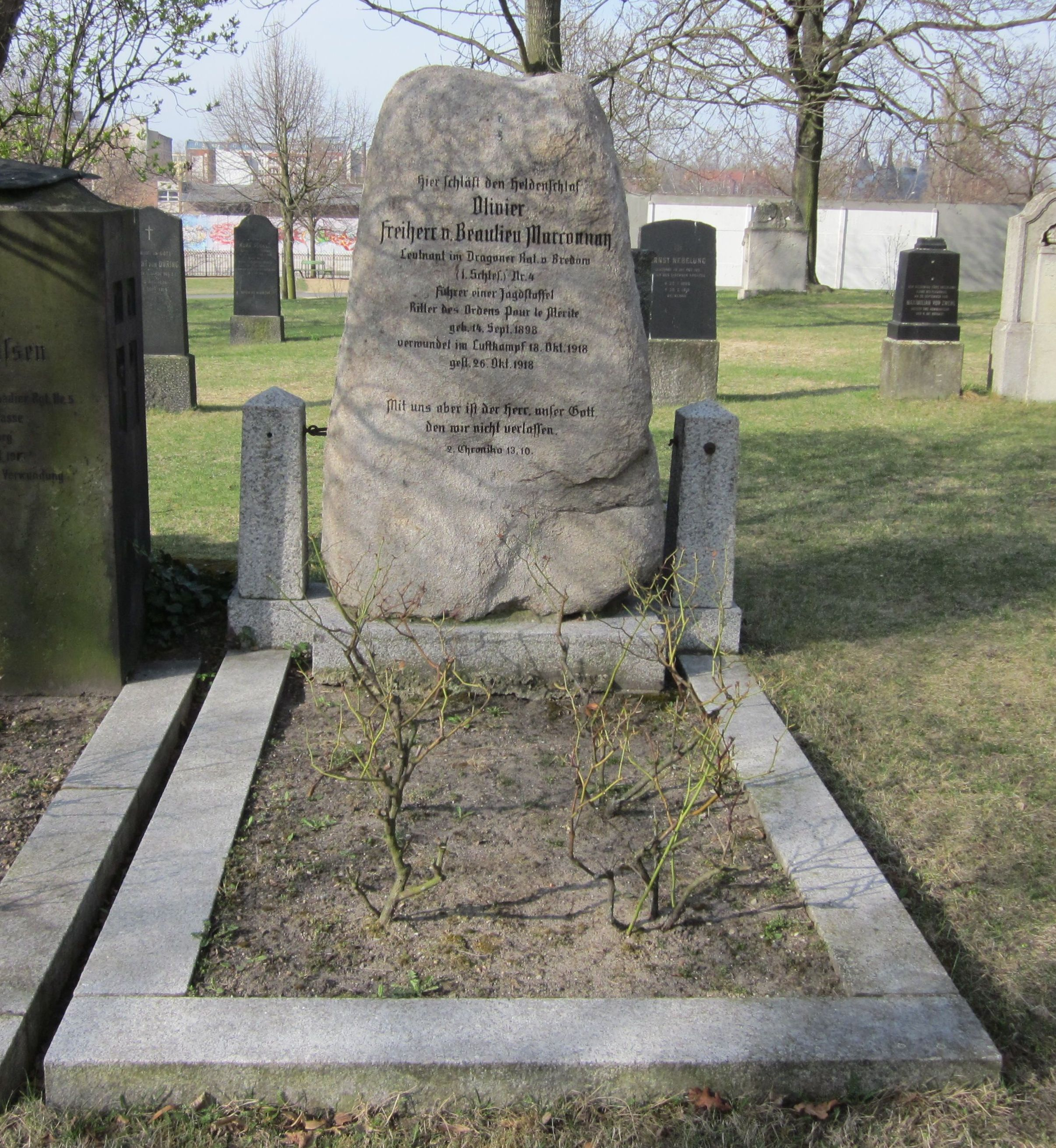
Grave of Oliver von Beaulieu Marconnay (1918) on the Invalidenfriedhof in Berlin

The award of the Pour le Merite was reportedly rushed through as it could not be awarded posthumously, and to procrastinate risked the young ace's death while he was honored with only the Iron Cross Notice of the award was forwarded to the hospital on 26 October 1918. However, Olivier Freiherr von Beaulieu-Marconnay, who had lingered with his wound for eight days, died six hours before the news arrived, possibly as the result of a post-operative infection.

He was buried in the famous Invalidenfriedhof in Berlin. His grave lies in a triangular arrangement with those of his old commander Rudolf Berthold and Berthold's friend Hans-Joachim Buddecke.
