= Wilhelm Kühne (aviator) =

German flying ace (1888–1918)

- Born: 11 December 1888
- Died: 30 August 1918 (aged 29)
- Military career
- Allegiance: Germany
- Branch: Aviation
- Rank: Offizierstellvertreter (Officer candidate)
- Units: FA 14; Jagdstaffel 15; Jagdstaffel 29; Jagdstaffel 18
- Awards: Iron Cross (both classes)

Offizierstellvertreter Wilhelm Kühne (11 December 1888 – 30 August 1918) was a World War I flying ace credited with seven confirmed aerial victories and five unconfirmed ones.

== Biography ==
Wilhelm Kühne was born on 11 December 1888, though his birthplace is unknown. On 13 October 1909, he began his military service in Fusilier Regiment No. 10 of the German Army. In late 1913, he transferred to aviation service.

At some point, he trained as a pilot, as he flew for Flieger-Abteilung (Flier Detachment) 14. He then attended the Jastaschule (Fighter School) in Warsaw to convert to piloting single seat fighters. On 15 February 1917, he was posted to Jagdstaffel 29 as a fighter pilot. He staked his first victory claim there, for 12 May 1917, but it was unconfirmed.

In January 1918, he was transferred to Jagdstaffel 15. On 20 March, he moved to Jagdstaffel 18 when the two fighter squadrons swapped pilots. Five days later, he scored his first confirmed aerial victory. He continued to score and submit claims, but several of his claims were awarded to other pilots under the German confirmation system. By 28 August 1918, he was credited with seven confirmed victories, with six more denied.

On 30 August 1918, he engaged Airco DH.4s from No. 55 Squadron RAF of the Independent Air Force and was killed in action. By the time of his death, he had won both classes of the Iron Cross and been credited with destroying four enemy observation balloons and three enemy airplanes. However, he had not been commissioned.
