= Monnington =

Monnington may refer to:

- Monnington on Wye, village in western Herefordshire, England
- Ernest Monnington Bowden (1860–1904), Irishman who invented the Bowden mechanism
- Kurt Adolf Monnington, World War I flying ace credited with eight aerial victories
- Walter Thomas Monnington (1902–1976), English painter
