= Kurt Seit =

- Born: 30 July 1894
- Died: Unknown
- Military career
- Allegiance: Germany
- Branch: Aviation
- Rank: Leutnant
- Units: Flieger-Abteilung 199 (Flier Detachment 199); Jagdstaffel 80
- Awards: Iron Cross, Silver Wound Badge

Leutnant Kurt Seit (born 30 July 1894, date of death unknown) was a German World War I flying ace credited with five aerial victories.

== Biography ==
Kurt Seit was born on 30 July 1894. He was serving in the German ground forces when World War I began. He was awarded the Iron Cross Second Class on 3 November 1914. He transferred to aviation duty, serving with Flieger-Abteilung 199 (Flier Detachment 199). He subsequently went for fighter training, which got him posted to Jagdstaffel 80 on 4 June 1918.

On 22 July 1918, he shot down an Airco DH.9 bomber from No. 99 Squadron RAF. Four days later, he was awarded the Iron Cross First Class. He would down an enemy aircraft each of the next four months, bagging two more DH.9s, an observation balloon, and a Breguet XIV.

Although the dates are unknown, Seitz was wounded four times, entitling him to the Silver Wound Badge
