= Josef Veltjens =

WW2 German Luftwaffe officer (1894–1943)

- Josef Veltjens in 1918
- Born: 2 June 1894; Geldern, German Empire
- Died: 6 October 1943 (aged 49); Monte Cervellino, Northern Italy
- Burial place: Piacenza, Italy; Reinterred at Travemünde, Germany
- Military career
- Allegiance: German Empire (to 1918); Nazi Germany
- Branch: Infantry; Luftwaffe
- Service years: 1914–1919; 1940–1943
- Rank: Oberst d. R. (Colonel reserves)
- Nickname: "Seppl"
- Units: Guards Regiment 4, Infantry Regiment 8, Flieger-Abteilung (Artillerie) 23, Jagdstaffel 14, Jagdstaffel 18, Jagdstaffel 15
- Commands: Jagdstaffel 15; Jagdgeschwader II
- Awards: Pour le Mérite, House Order of Hohenzollern, Iron Cross; Commander Cross First Class with Swords of the Order of the White Rose of Finland
- Other work: International arms dealer, and Hermann Goering's financial confidant

Josef "Seppl" Veltjens (2 June 1894 – 6 October 1943) was a German World War I fighter ace credited with 35 victories. In later years, he served as an international arms dealer, as well as a personal emissary from Hermann Göring to Benito Mussolini. He was awarded Pour le Mérite, the Royal House Order of Hohenzollern, and the Iron Cross.

== Early life ==
Josef Veltjens was born in Geldern, Rhineland, Imperial Germany, the son of a factory manager. He attended the Humanistic High School in Berlin, then the Technical University in Charlottenburg, where he read mechanical engineering. His prime interest was internal combustion engines.

He enlisted in the Kaiserin Augusta Guards Regiment Number 4 on 3 August 1914. Four days later, he and his regiment were at the front. When his column was attacked by the French, Veltjens and three others tried unsuccessfully to defend it. The vehicles were set on fire. As a straggler, Veltjens joined Infantry Regiment Number 8. Promotion to Vizefeldwebel (literally vice-sergeant) rapidly followed. After several requests, he was sent for aviation training.

== World War I service ==
On 2 December 1915, at Johannisthal near Berlin, Veltjens first soloed in a plane. He took his pilot's examination on 15 December after three solo flights. Without waiting for his official pilot's ticket, he took advantage of the confusion of the holiday season to take himself to Tergnier.

He was posted as a member of Flieger Abteilung 23 on 10 May 1916, to fly reconnaissance missions. Because of his success, he was commissioned as a Leutnant der Reserve (lieutenant in the reserves). He served there with another future ace, Rudolf Berthold. From there, he moved on to single-seat fighters with Royal Prussian Jagdstaffel 14 when Berthold was given its command.

Veltjens scored his first victory, over a SPAD, on 14 April 1917. He was flying an Albatros D.III at the time, with his own personal aircraft marking of a white barbed arrow pointed back from the scarlet nose down the length of the royal blue fuselage. By 1 June, he had downed three more SPADs and a Farman. Berthold mentored him through this, but was very demanding.

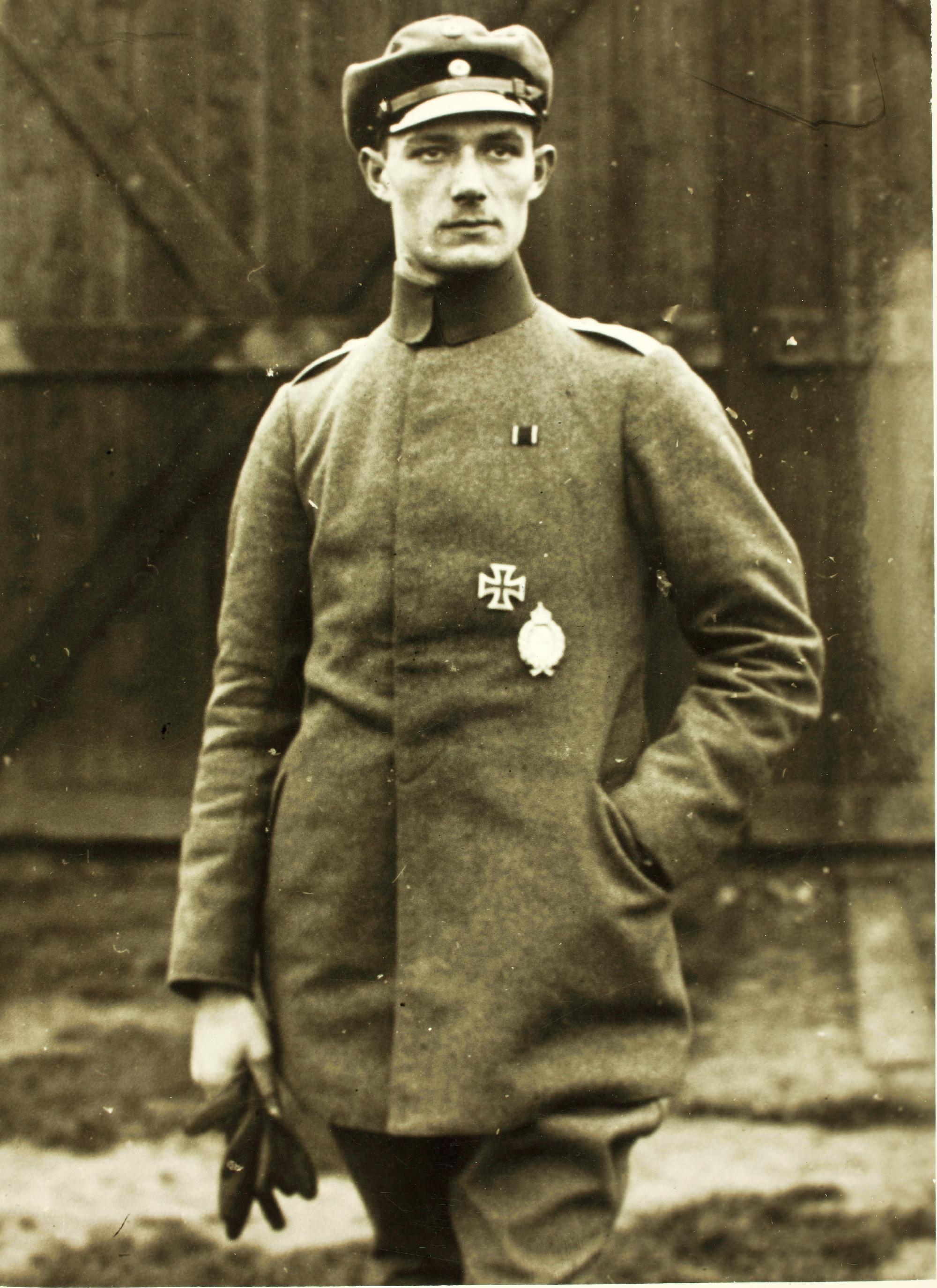
Another view of Veltjens in World War I

Veltjens was then transferred to Royal Prussian Jasta 18 in August at commanding officer Berthold's request. This Jasta was then operating Albatros D.Vs and Fokker Dr.1s. Veltjens first scored for them on 16 September 1917; he scored his ninth victory on 15 November to close out 1917.

He marked up his tenth kill on 18 February 1918. He was then reassigned to Jasta 15 the following month. This was an interesting swap, in which Berthold took his pilots with him when he transferred; Jasta 15's pilots in turn became Jasta 18. The exchange meant Berthold, Veltjens, and the rest of the new Jasta 15 were now part of the prestigious Jagdgeschwader II. Jasta 15 would soon be re-equipped with the Fokker D.VII.

Veltjens rose to its command on 18 May, on the same day he scored his 13th victory. He was appointed to replace an officer suspected of conspiring to have the wounded Berthold removed as JG II commander. May also saw Veltjens awarded the First Class Iron Cross, followed by the Knight's Cross of the Royal House Order of Hohenzollern on 20 May, followed by the Pour le Mérite on 16 August 1918.

By 10 August 1918, Veltjens' score had risen to 23. In that day's fighting his score rose two more. It also marked the day Berthold collided with a British DH.4 and crashed into a house; he survived, but his injuries hospitalized him to the war's end. Veltjens shot down two Caudrons and an RAF SE.5a the following day.

Another Hauptmann (captain) was appointed to his command, but Veltjens was chosen to lead JG II into aerial combat. Berthold temporarily escaped from hospital on the 12th despite serious injuries and returned to resume command. The commander of two days surrendered his position. Berthold was ordered the following day to return to hospital and turn command of the entire Jagdschwader over to Veltjens, who promptly turned leadership of Jasta 15 over to his former pilot in FFA 23, his old friend Joachim von Ziegesar. Three days later, on 16 August, Veltjens received the "Blue Max", as the Pour le Mérite was nicknamed.

His victory total was 31 when he went on leave, leaving Oscar Freiherr von Boenigk in charge. Upon his return, he resumed command of JG II on 28 September, only to be bumped down once again to command Jasta 15 from 12 October to Armistice Day. During this time, he raised his victory total to 35.

== Between the wars ==
Veltjens joined Freikorps Gerstenberg in the aftermath of Germany's defeat. He was wounded three times while commanding an armoured car in a January 1919 assault on Spartakists (German communists) in Bremen.

He followed this with a spell as a merchant sailor on his own sailing ship, the Merkur, a 100-ton vessel. By helping the German Navy to rearm in secrecy, he drifted into arms dealing. This became his lifelong business. He supplied Mustafa Kemal Atatürk for the establishment of the Turkish Republic and Chiang Kai-shek for the unification of a nationalist China.

He joined both the Nazi Party and its Brownshirts (Sturmabteilung, SA) in 1929, as one of the early adherents. This did not last long: after a face-to-face confrontation with Hitler in 1931, he resigned from the party and the SA. This put him on the blacklist of the SS (Schutzstaffel), who repeatedly arrested him. His World War I comrade, Hermann Göring, managed to protect him.

In 1935, Mussolini requested arms from Germany to support him in the Second Italo-Abyssinian War, and Göring delegated the task of supply to Veltjens. The United Kingdom and France were actually the official allies of Italy at the time in order to stop Italy from getting too close to Germany, but refrained from supplying arms because both warring countries were members of the League of Nations.

Just before the outbreak of the Spanish Civil War in March 1936, Colonel Veltjens was contacted by Infante Alfonso, Duke of Galliera, Infante of Spain, who lived in Portugal at the time. He asked Veltjens to assist with the supply of arms to the generals, who planned a coup d'état against the newly elected leftist alliance.

In late 1936, Veltjens was instrumental in founding a shipping company of three vessels to supply munitions to the Nationalists. His shipments could be as large as ten million rounds of ammunition at a time, or half a dozen fighter planes. He specialised in transporting high explosives, although he once shipped a brigade of 600 Irish Blueshirts to the war.

Veltjens was requested by the Soviets to also supply the Spanish Republicans. This deal was cut in Paris. However, the cargo was not arms, but a load of rocks, loaded in boxes and disguised by a layer of boxes with rifles on top. The shipment went through Stockholm, where it was transferred to a Russian freighter, which took it to Gijón in the north of Spain. This operation got him into trouble with the Swedish government. The proceeds were, after costs, donated to a charity for German widows of the Spanish Civil War, and to General Emilio Mola's war chest. He later added a few more ships to his fleet, which sailed under the Panamanian flag to disguise German involvement.

Veltjens was paid by both sides in British pounds sterling. When Hitler later decided to support Franco, he did so in secrecy at first, but Veltjens was allowed by Göring to continue his private dealings, mainly because of his possession of tungsten and molybdenum necessary for the prompt production of his orders.

When Finland was about to be attacked by Soviet Union in November 1939, Veltjens was approached by the Finns in the hope that he could help with the supply of arms, since Hitler had prohibited direct arms shipments from Germany in order to avoid provoking Soviet Union. However Veltjens was able to ship some quantities of arms and ammunition from various countries at extremely short notice. He later received a Finnish decoration, the Commander Cross First Class with Swords of the Order of the White Rose of Finland.

== World War II ==
Veltjens was recalled into the Luftwaffe at the start of World War II.

In August 1940, Veltjens, with the rank of Oberstleutnant (lieutenant colonel), served as Göring's personal emissary in negotiations with Finland just before the Continuation War. Despite his relatively low rank, he ended up dealing with Prime Minister Ryti and Marshal Mannerheim because of his close, albeit secret, prior relations with them before and during the Winter War. These negotiations resulted in a trade-off; German troops would have unhindered transit through Finnish territory in exchange for arms that the Finns could use against a threatened Russian encroachment.

As a result of the so-called Veltjens-Agreement in 1941, German troops moved into Finland beginning on 8 June 1941.

Oberst Veltjens' next assignment was as special plenipotentiary against black marketing in occupied Europe, beginning in May, 1942. It was his job to be sure only authorised German conglomerates bought the goods needed by that country.

In 1943 during World War II, Veltjens also served as Göring's emissary to Benito Mussolini in Salò. He was to negotiate the distribution of the Italian National Reserves of gold bullion that had been removed from Rome to Milan by the SS. This involved its allocation as payment of Italy's debts on behalf of the various stakeholders, including the Kingdom of Italy, the new Italian Social Republic, Germany and lastly the Swiss National Bank as the major creditor. Before his subsequent flight from Milan to Rome to finalise aspects of his negotiations, Veltjens' pilot had been warned of the possibility of Allied fighters in the area, and elected to fly low across the Apennine Mountains. However, on 6 October 1943 the Junkers Ju 52 crashed into Monte Cervellino, Veltjens and all but one of the crew died as a result.

Veltjens was originally buried in Italy, but his body was later transferred home to Lübeck, Germany.
