= Hans Müller (aviator) =

German aviator (1896–1964)

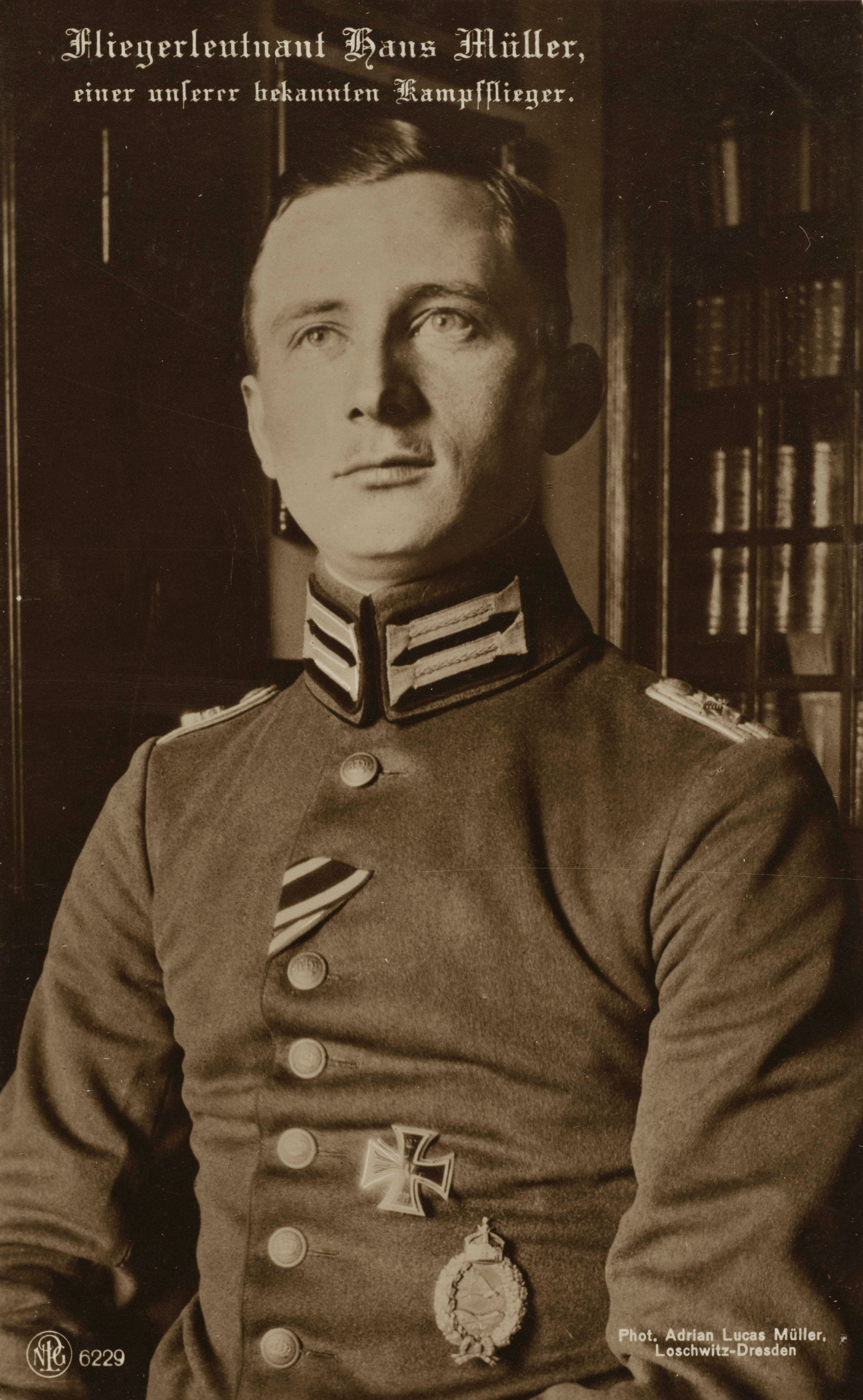
- Born: 3 July 1896; Etzel, Ostfriesland
- Died: 1964 (aged 67–68); Munich, Germany
- Military career
- Allegiance: German Empire
- Branch: Imperial German Air Service
- Rank: Leutnant
- Units: Jagdstaffel 12; Jagdstaffel 15; Jagdstaffel 18
- Awards: Iron Cross

Leutnant Hans Müller, alias Hans Garelt, was a German World War I flying ace credited with twelve aerial victories.

== World War I ==
On 1 April 1914, Müller joined Infantry Regiment No. 13. He began World War I with this unit, but transferred to aviation in November 1916. He flew two-seaters a bit, then joined Jagdstaffel 12 in late 1917. In early January 1918, he transferred to Jagdstaffel 15 to fly a Fokker Triplane. He scored for the first time on 9 January 1918. On the 29th, he got a confirmed win but had a second one not confirmed. He switched squadrons to Jagdstaffel 18. Between 27 March and 13 September, he shot down and destroyed five more opponents. Between 9:00 and 9:15 AM on 14 September, Müller shot down three Spad XIIIs from the American 13th Aero Squadron . At 2:40 PM that same afternoon, he shot down a fourth Spad from that same squadron. A week later, he finished his tally with one last Spad.

== Post World War I ==
Hans Müller, at some point, had a neighbor with that identical name. The aviator changed his last name to Garrelt to obviate confusion in their mail delivery.

During World War II, Müller served on the staff of Luftflotte 3 of the Luftwaffe.

Post World War II, he designed steam locomotives for Hanomag and Henschel. He died of a brain tumor in 1964.
