= Kurt Adolf Monnington =

German Air Force officer (1891–1939)

- Born: 29 September 1891; Hamburg, Germany
- Died: 17 February 1939 (aged 47); Hamburg, Germany
- Burial place: Hamburg, Germany
- Military career
- Allegiance: Germany
- Branch: Aviation (Luftstreitkräfte)
- Rank: Leutnant
- Units: Flieger-Abteilung (Flier Detachment) 62, Jagdstaffel (Fighter Squadron) 15, Jagdstaffel (Fighter Squadron) 18,
- Awards: Iron Cross

Leutnant Kurt Adolf Monnington (1891–1939) was a World War I flying ace credited with eight aerial victories.

== Biography ==
Kurt Adolf Monnington was born on 29 September 1891 in Hamburg, the German Empire. His original service during World War I was with the German ground forces. He won an Iron Cross Second Class on 14 June 1915.

Monnington began his aviation career with a two-seater reconnaissance unit, Flieger-Abteilung (Flier Detachment) 62. After that seasoning, he was reassigned as a fighter pilot with Jagdstaffel (Fighter Squadron) 15 in 1917. His First Class Iron Cross came on 12 December 1917. He was one of the pilots who switched wholesale from Jasta 15 to Leutnant der Reserve August Raben's-commanded Jagdstaffel (Fighter Squadron) 18 in March 1918. Jasta 18 would center on Metz as its basis of operations.

On 11 May 1918, Monnington scored his first aerial victory, when he shot down a Royal Aircraft Factory SE.5a over Bailleul at 1825 hours. Mid-day on 5 June, he scored again, shooting down a Bristol F.2 Fighter north of Violanes, France.

His combat career following that concentrated on interception of bombers intruding into Germany. He shot down Airco DH.4 number D7223 from No. 99 Squadron RAF over Grosbliederstroff on 31 July 1918. On 12 August, Airco DH.9 number D2931 from No. 104 Squadron RAF of the Independent Air Force fell under Monnington's guns. The following day, two DH.9s from the same squadron collided while avoiding his fire; Monnington was credited with both victories.

On 10 October 1918, he downed yet another DH.9 from 104 Squadron. On 23 October, he scored his fifth victory against 104 Squadron, destroying DH.9 number D2932 over Fourasse Wood.

Leutnant Kurt Monnington ended his war with eight confirmed victories, both classes of the Iron Cross, and Württemberg's Military Service Cross.

He died in his native Hamburg of pneumonia on 17 February 1939 and was buried in Friedhof Diebstich.
