= Oskar Freiherr von Boenigk =

German Generalmajor

- Born: 25 August 1893; Siegerdorf, Bunzlau, Silesia
- Died: 30 January 1946 (aged 52); Lager Ketschendorf
- Military career
- Allegiance: German Empire (1912-1918); Weimar Republic (1918-1920); Nazi Germany (1934-1945)
- Branch: Grenadiers; Air Service; Luftwaffe
- Service years: 1912–1920; 1934–1943
- Rank: Generalmajor
- Units: Koenig Friederich III Grenadier Regiment; Kampfstaffel 19; Kampfstaffel 32; Jagdstaffel 4
- Commands: Jagdstaffel 21; Jagdgeschwader II
- Conflicts: World War I World War II
- Awards: Pour le Merite; Albert Order Second Class; Saxe-Ernestine House Order Second Class; Order of Saint John; Iron Cross First and Second Class
- Other work: Generalmajor in Luftwaffe during World War II

Oskar Freiherr von Boenigk (25 August 1893 – 30 January 1946) was a German Generalmajor, he began his military career during World War I as a fighter ace credited with 26 victories. He survived the war, served in the post-war revolution, and eventually rose to the rank of Generalmajor in the Luftwaffe during World War II.

== Early life and infantry service ==
Oskar von Boenigk was born on 25 August 1893 in Siegerdorf, Bunzlau, Silesia, the son of an army officer. He began his military career as an 11-year-old cadet, which led to his being commissioned into the 11th Grenadier Regiment on 22 March 1912.

When World War I began, he was immediately assigned as a platoon leader until suffering a severe chest wound in October 1914 during the Battle of Longwy. His valor won him an Iron Cross Class, awarded 23 September 1914.

On 24 October 1914, he was promoted to company commander while carrying the simultaneous position of Ordnance Officer. He remained in these posts until 19 December 1915, when he transferred to aviation training. During this time, he fought in the battles of Loretto Heights and Arras. He was wounded again during 1915.

== World War I aviation service ==
Boenigk switched to aviation and began training with the 7th Flying Replacement Battalion in December 1915. Upon graduation from aerial observer training, he was assigned successively to a couple of bomber squadrons, Kampfstaffel 19 and Kampfstaffel 32. He flew as an observer originally, later transferring to Jastaschule.

Upon graduation from Jastaschule, he was assigned to Royal Prussian Jagdstaffel 4, which was becoming part of Germany's first fighter wing, Jagdgeschwader II. His arrival in Jagdstaffel 4 was coincidental with that of his commanding officer, Oberleutnant Kurt-Bertram von Döring. The two of them would serve under Germany's ace of aces, Manfred von Richthofen, who would be appointed to command the newly formed Jagdgeschwader II on 26 July.

Von Boenigk scored his first aerial victory on 20 July 1917. By 9 September, when he scored his fifth and final victory for Jagdstaffel 4, he was an ace, even without credit for two unconfirmed claims. He would serve as a pilot in Jagdstaffel 4 for four months, before being promoted to command Jagdstaffel 21 on 23 October 1917. He would command Jagdstaffel 21 until 27 August 1918.

He scored win number six for his new squadron, on 25 November 1917, then lapsed for six months. When he resumed scoring on 1 June 1918, he began a steady trickle of triumphs, with six victims in June, four in July, and five in August. He notched number 21 on 11 August 1918.

He would then be promoted on 31 August to lead Jagdgeschwader II, and would hold that position until 27 December 1918, after the end of the war. He shot down his last five opponents in ten days in September 1918.

In October 1918, he was awarded the Ducal Saxe-Ernestine House Order and Order of Albert. On 25 October 1918, he was awarded Germany's premier award for courage, the Pour le Merite.

His final tabulation was 14 enemy fighters confirmed downed, along with 2 unconfirmed. He also shot down seven observation balloons; balloons were usually well-defended and difficult to bring down. There were also five two-seaters to his credit.

== Between the wars ==
Von Boenigk transferred to command of the 418th Volunteer Flying Battalion on 28 December 1918, operating in Border Protection East, until 17 September 1919. There was a short-lived assignment to lead the 202nd Fighter Wing, which ended after only twelve days. Then he returned to his original unit, the 11th Grenadiers, and was retired on 31 March 1920. He was promoted to Hauptmann (captain) just before his discharge.

From 1 July 1924 through 30 November 1933, he held executive office in the German Front-Line Soldiers Union. He then held a short appointment as director of the Voluntary Working Service, this ending on 30 June 1934.

He returned to aviation duty on 1 July 1934, being accepted as a Major in the Luftwaffe. His first assignment was as Commander of the German Transport Flying School in Cottbus. It was the first of several assignments to flying schools that ran through 29 December 1939.

== Service in World War II ==
Von Boenigk served as a commandant of aerodromes and airports. He attained the rank of Generalmajor. He retired from the Luftwaffe on 31 May 1943. He was captured by the invading Russians in May 1945, and was imprisoned until his death in captivity on 30 January 1946.

== Decorations and awards ==
- World War I
  - Pour le Mérite - 25 October 1918
  - Saxe-Ernestine House Order, Knight's Cross Second Class with Swords - October 1918
  - Albert Order - October 1918
  - Iron Cross of 1914
    - 1st class - 29 October 1916
    - 2nd class - 23 September 1914
