= Gustav Klaudat =

WW1 German flying ace

- Born: Unknown date Eastern part of Kingdom of Prussia, The German Empire
- Died: After 11 November 1918
- Military career
- Allegiance: Germany
- Branch: Aviation
- Rank: Vizefeldwebel
- Unit: Jagdstaffel 15
- Conflicts: World War I
- Awards: Iron Cross

Vizefeldwebel Gustav Klaudat was a German World War I flying ace credited with six aerial victories.

== Biography ==
=== Origins ===
Gustav Klaudat was born in eastern Prussia. He was serving in a Uhlan regiment during World War I when he transferred to aviation. Although it was customary for German pilots to serve in reconnaissance or artillery direction units as seasoning before becoming fighter pilots, nothing is known of Klaudat's service before he joined a fighter squadron, Jagdstaffel 15, in 1918.

=== Service as a fighter pilot ===
Klaudat flew a Fokker D.VII painted in the squadron colors of blue tail and red nose. To that he added an overpainted personal marking of a Uhlan lance sporting a black and white banner.

On 20 July 1918, just after his arrival at Jasta 15, Klaudat lent his aircraft to his squadron leader, Rudolph Berthold, who crashed it. Klaudat had to be supplied with another mount; he received one with a highly prized BMW engine. At 1220 hours on 15 August 1918, he shot down a Caudron R.11 over Conecticourt. Two days later, at 1710 hours, it was the turn of a Spad XIII that fell over Beaurains; it has variously been attributed as being from the 94th Aero Squadron USAS, or as being Jean Bozon-Verduraz. On 21 August 1918, Klaudat shot down a Breguet 14 south of Chaunay at 1650 hours. A week later, he was awarded the Iron Cross Second Class.

On 13 September, Klaudat shot down two Spad XIIIs on two different sorties for victories four and five. On 16 September 1918, he fought in the dog fight that brought down Maurice Boyau; Klaudat was credited with shooting down Boyau's wingman at midday over St-Hilaire. That was his last victory, although a 1 October combat claim of another Spad XIII would be undecided. On 23 October 1918, Gustav Klaudat was wounded severely enough in the left humerus, probably by Eddie Rickenbacker, to be removed from action for the remainder of the war.
