= Johannes Klein =

German World War I flying ace (died 1926)

- Died: 1926
- Military career
- Allegiance: Germany
- Branch: Aviation
- Rank: Leutnant
- Units: Jagdstaffel 27 or Jagdstaffel 29; Jagdstaffel 18; Jagdstaffel 15
- Awards: Royal House Order of Hohenzollern; Iron Cross

Leutnant Johannes Klein (died 1926) was a German World War I flying ace credited with 16 confirmed and two unconfirmed aerial victories.

== Biography ==
Johannes Klein's life is unknown before he began his aviation service. He became a fighter pilot in February 1917, and received his initial assignment to either Royal Prussian Jagdstaffel 27 or Royal Prussian Jagdstaffel 29. Regardless of his exact assignment, he failed to score any aerial victories. He switched to Royal Prussian Jagdstaffel 18 in August 1917, and scored his first victories there, downing a Spad on 16 August and a Sopwith Camel on 5 September. Klein then transferred to Royal Prussian Jagdstaffel 15 as part of Rudolf Berthold's swapping of personnel between the two units. Klein scored the remainder of his wins between 30 March and 25 September 1918.

Klein was slightly wounded on 15 September 1918. He was awarded the Royal House Order of Hohenzollern on 19 September 1918, having previously earned the Iron Cross.

Johannes Klein died in 1926.
