= Joseph Frank Wehner =

American fighter pilot

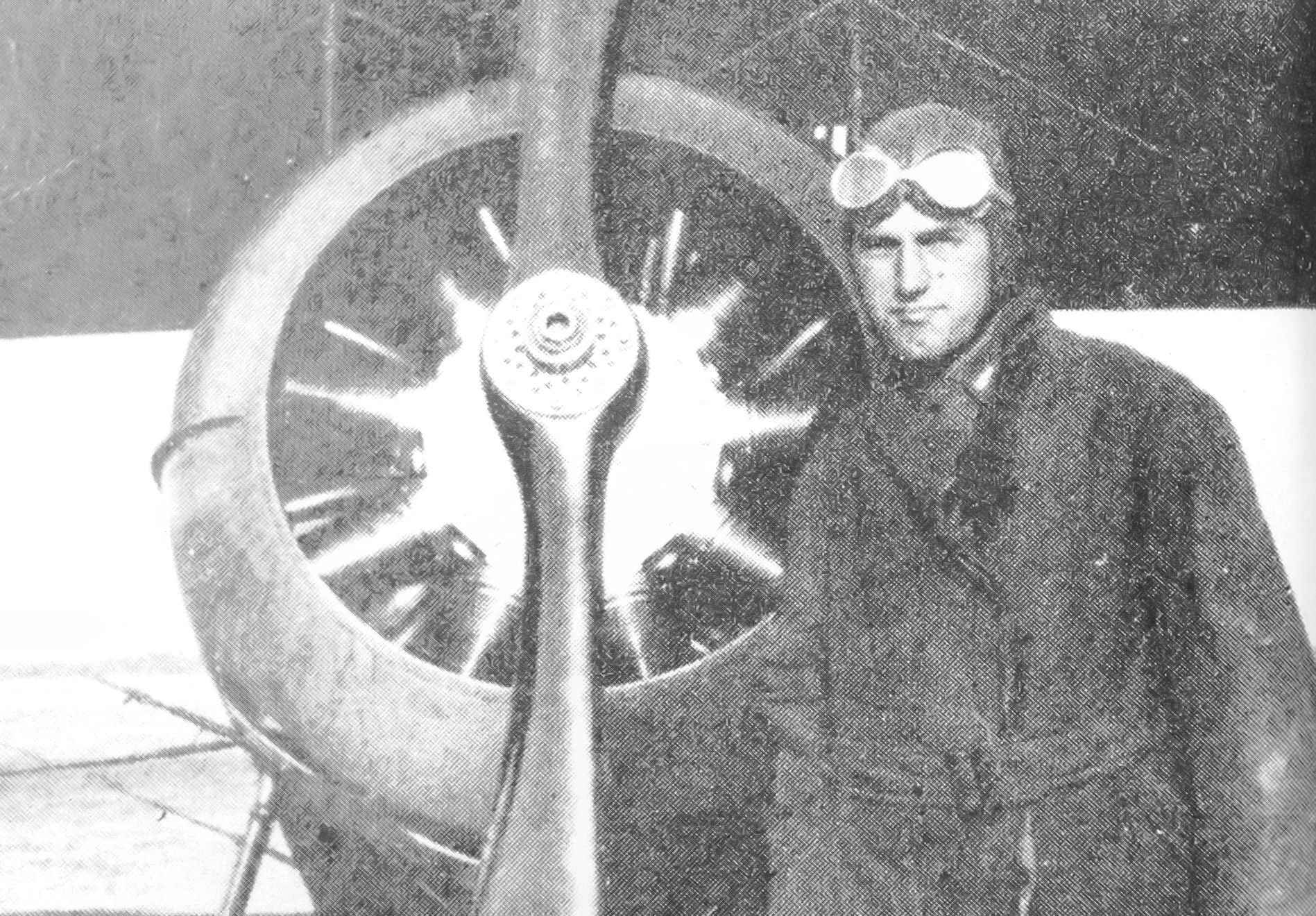
- Lieutenant Joseph Frank Wehner. 27th Aero Squadron
- Born: September 20, 1895; Roxbury, Massachusetts, USA
- Died: September 18, 1918 (aged 22); Vicinity of Serrouville, France
- Military career
- Allegiance: United States
- Branch: Air Service, United States Army
- Rank: Lieutenant
- Nickname: Fritz
- Unit: 27th Aero Squadron
- Conflicts: World War I
- Awards: Distinguished Service Cross with Oak Leaf Cluster

Joseph Frank Wehner ( September 20, 1895 – September 18, 1918), also known as Fritz Wehner, was an American fighter pilot and wingman to Frank Luke.

== Early life ==
Wehner was born in Roxbury, Massachusetts, on September 20, 1895. Wehner's athletic achievements as captain of the Everett High School football team earned him a scholarship to the Phillips Exeter Academy in Exeter, New Hampshire, in 1914. He was working for the YMCA in Berlin, Germany, when the United States entered World War I on April 6, 1917. He enlisted in the United States Army Signal Corps during June 1917.

== Aerial service ==
While receiving flight training, Wehner's German ancestry led to an investigation followed by an unsubstantiated arrest for suspicion of treason by the Secret Service. He was cleared and departed for England in February 1918. He was assigned to the 27th Aero Squadron under Major Harold Hartney in July 1918.

Flying as wingman to the mercurial balloon-buster Frank Luke, Wehner shot down one Fokker D.VII and five balloons in just three days of aerial combat during September 1918.

Protecting Luke as he attacked a third balloon, Wehner's SPAD XIII was shot down by Luftstreitkräfte ace Georg von Hantelmann of Jasta 15 on September 18, 1918. Wehner, who fell behind enemy lines, was taken to a German hospital where he died a short time later from his injuries. His body was recovered and buried in an American cemetery in Europe after the war, but it was reinterred at Woodlawn Cemetery in his hometown of Everett, Massachusetts in 1921.

He was awarded the Distinguished Service Cross, America's second highest award for combat valor, twice.

== Honors and awards ==
Distinguished Service Cross (DSC)

The Distinguished Service Cross is presented to Joseph Frank Wehner, First Lieutenant (Air Service), U.S. Army, for extraordinary heroism in action near Rouvres, France, September 15, 1918. While on a mission First Lieutenant Wehner found an enemy patrol of eight machines attacking a single American observation machine. He immediately attacked, destroying one and forcing another down out of control, his own plane being badly damaged by enemy machine-gun fire. He managed to convey the American plane to safety.

Distinguished Service Cross (DSC) with Oak Leaf Cluster The Distinguished Service Cross is presented to Joseph Frank Wehner, First Lieutenant (Air Service), U.S. Army, for extraordinary heroism in action near Mangiennes and Reville, France, September 16, 1918. Amid terrific antiaircraft and ground machine-gun fire First Lieutenant Wehner descended, attacked, and destroyed two enemy balloons. One of these balloons was destroyed in flames after it had been hauled to the ground and was resting in its bed.

== See also ==
- List of World War I flying aces from the United States

== Bibliography ==
- American Aces of World War I. Norman Franks, Harry Dempsey. Osprey Publishing, 2001. ISBN 1-84176-375-6, ISBN 978-1-84176-375-0.
