= Jagdstaffel 80 =

Jasta 80
- Active: 1917–1918
- Country: Kingdom of Bavaria, German Empire
- Branch: Luftstreitkräfte
- Type: Fighter squadron
- Engagements: World War I

Royal Bavarian Jagdstaffel 80, commonly abbreviated to Jasta 80, was a "hunting group" (i.e., fighter squadron) of the Luftstreitkräfte, the air arm of the Imperial German Army during World War I. The squadron scored 15 aerial victories during the war, including four observation balloons downed. The unit's victories came at the expense of two killed in action, three killed in flying accidents, two injured in accidents, six wounded in action, and one taken prisoner of war.

== History ==
Jasta 80 was founded on 19 October 1917 at Fliegerersatz-Abteilung ("Replacement Detachment") 2b at Fürth. It was assigned to 19 Armee on 27 February 1918. The new squadron scored its first aerial victory on 3 May 1918. Jasta 80 disbanded on 2 December 1918.

== Commanding officers (Staffelführer) ==
- Erwin Wenig: circa 27 February 1918

== Duty stations ==
- Morsberg: 27 February 1918
- Duss
- Nebingen
- Morsberg: 2 March 1918 - war's end

== Notable personnel ==
- Kurt Seit

== Aircraft ==
Jasta 80 operated Fokker D.VI fighters for a while. However, its unreliable engines caused re-equipment with Fokker D.VIIs.
