= Jagdstaffel 15 =

Jasta 15
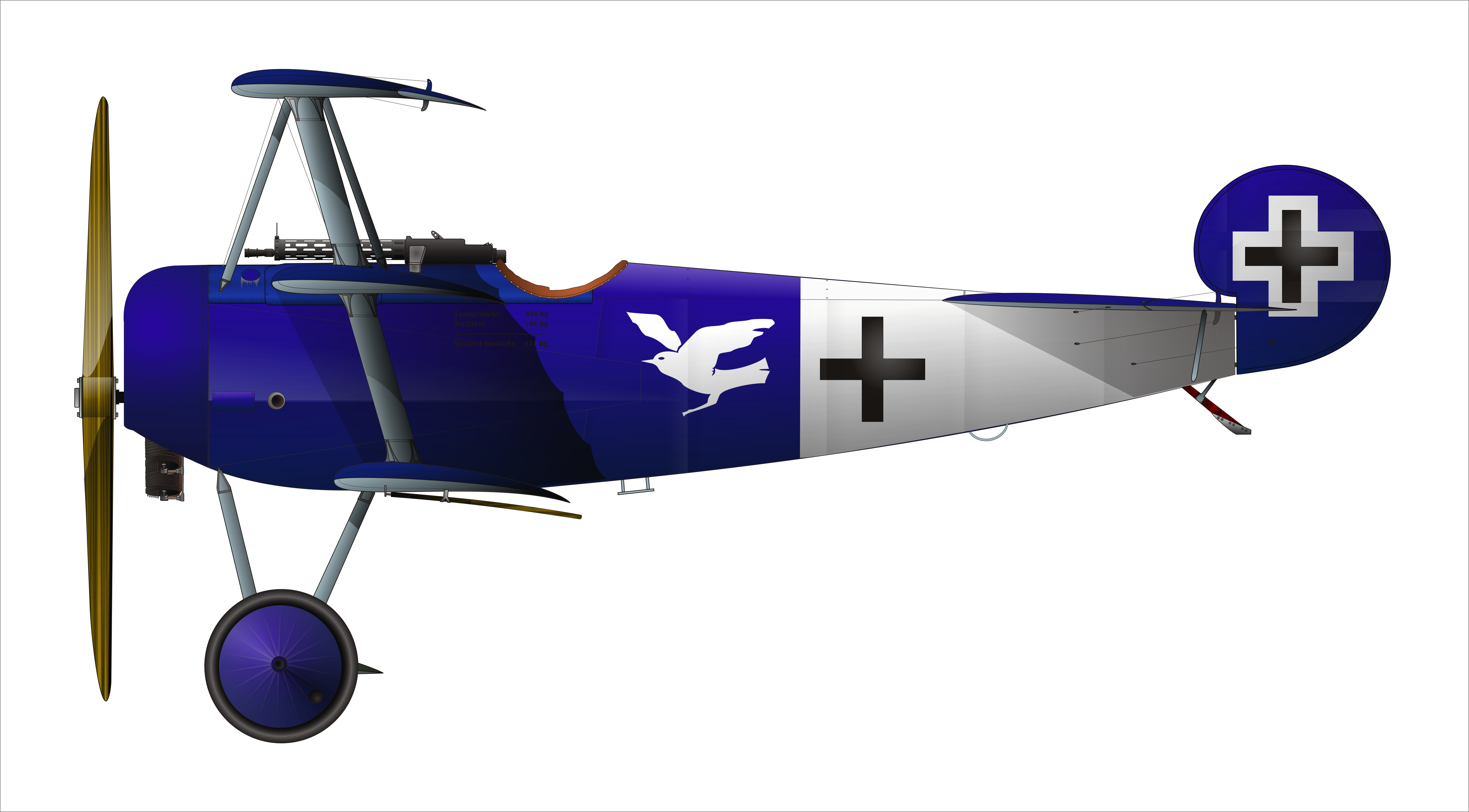
- Fokker Dr I of Lt Raben of Jasta 15
- Active: 1916–1918
- Country: German Empire
- Branch: Luftstreitkräfte
- Type: Fighter squadron
- Engagements: World War I

Royal Prussian Jagdstaffel 15, commonly abbreviated to Jasta 15, was a "hunting group" (i.e., fighter squadron) of the Luftstreitkräfte, the air arm of the Imperial German Army during World War I. The unit would score over 150 aerial victories during the war, at the expense of seven killed in action, two killed in flying accidents, three wounded in action, one injured in a flying accident, and two taken prisoner of war.

== History ==
The "Jasta" was formed on 28 September 1916 at Rixheim, from Kampfeinsitzer Kommando Habsheim, FFA 48 and FFA 68. It mobilized on 9 October 1916. Three days later, it flew an interception mission against French and British bombers targeting Oberdorf's Mauser factory and destroyed three of them. For the next few months, the jasta achieved desultory results against French Nieuports and Caudrons. However, the ascension of Heinrich Gontermann to command in April 1917 changed that. The balloon buster ace arrived with 17 victories to this credit; in scoring 22 more with Jasta 15, he would account for about half the squadron's victories. His death via wing failure in an early model Fokker Dr.1 triplane grounded the new aircraft and dampened the jasta's performance. By the time it joined Jagdgeschwader II (JG II), Jagdstaffel 15 had about 47 victories to its credit.

It became part of JG II under Adolf Tutschek at Autremencourt in February 1918. On 19 March 1918, Rudolf Berthold took command of JG 2 when Tutschek was killed; he arranged a swap of Jasta 15's personnel with those of Jagdstaffel 18, so that Berthold could continue to command those with whom he was familiar - Leutnant der Reserve August Raben left Jasta 15 to take command of Jasta 18 from then on. Jasta 15 demobilized in November 1918 at FEA 14 in Halle an der Saale, Germany.

== Commanding officers ==
The following served as Staffelführer of the Jasta:

1. Oberleutnant Herman Kropp: 28 September 1916 – November 1916
2. Oberleutnant Max Reinhold: 9 November 1916 – 26 April 1917 (KIA)
3. Leutnant Heinrich Gontermann: 26 April 1917 – 30 October 1917 (Killed in flying accident)
4. Leutnant Hans Hermann von Budde: 30 October 1917 – 14 March 1918
5. Leutnant der Reserve August Raben: 14 March 1918 – 20 March 1918 (later leading the reformed Jagdstaffel 18)
6. Oberleutnant Ernst Turck: 20 March 1918 – 18 May 1918
7. Leutnant Josef Veltjens (Acting): 18 May 1918 – 13 August 1918
8. Leutnant Olivier Freiherr von Beaulieu-Marconnay: 13 August 1918 – 22 August 1918
9. Leutnant Josef Veltjens: 22 August 1918 – 11 November 1918

== Duty stations (airfields) ==
=== 1916 ===
- Bixhiem
- Habsheim (6 November 1916 - )

=== 1917 ===
- La Selve
- Le Clos Ferme
- Cambrai

=== 1918 ===
The Jasta used over a dozen airfields in support of 18 Armee, then moved to fly support of 5th Armee.

== Notable personnel ==
A number of notable aces served in the unit during its brief existence, including the following:

- Georg von Hantelmann
- Johannes Klein
- Olivier Freiherr von Beaulieu-Marconnay
- Gustav Klaudat
- Heinrich Arntzen
- Ernst Udet
- Hans Müller
- Arthur Rahn
- Kurt Haber

== Aircraft and operations ==
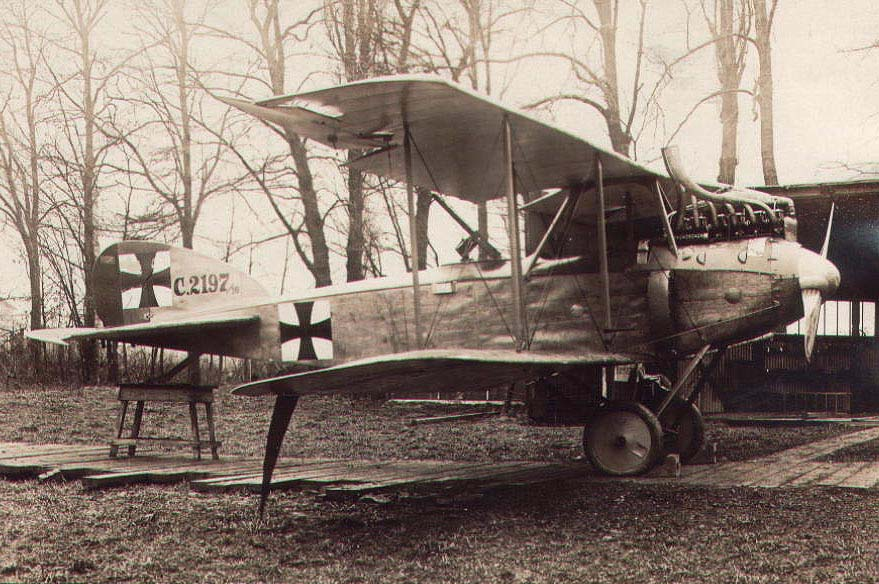
Albatros C.VII C.2197/16 of Lt Peckmann wounded in action 29 April 1917.

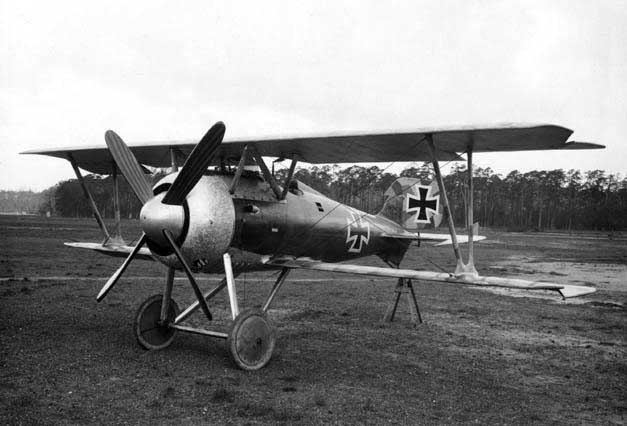
Jasta 15 was one of the few units to use the SSW D.III.

The unit was founded with Fokker D.IIs and Fokker D.IIIs. In 1917, it operated Albatros D.IIIs and Albatros D.Vs. Later, it then used Fokker Dr.I triplanes and some Siemens-Schuckert D.IIIs. Their final mount was the Fokker D.VII. By summer 1918, the Jasta's aircraft markings had settled to royal blue fuselage and tail, brown rudders, and red noses extending back as far as the cockpit.

Jasta 15 joined Jagdgeschwader II in February 1918. Identifiable by serial number or pilot insignia, these are some of the aircraft known to have served with the squadron:

- Two Albatros D.Vs
- Four Fokker Dr.Is
- Five Fokker D.VIIs
- Three Pfalz D.IIIs
- Two Siemens-Schuckert D.IIIs

== Bibliography ==
- Franks, Norman; Bailey, Frank W. & Guest, Russell F. (1993). Above The Lines: The Aces and Fighter Units of the German Air Service, Naval Air Service, and Flanders Marine Corps, 1914–1918. London, UK: Grub Street. ISBN 978-0-948817-73-1.
- VanWyngarden, Greg (2005). Jagdgeschwader Nr II. Oxford, UK: Osprey Publishing. ISBN 978-1-84176-727-7.
- VanWyngarden, Greg (2011). Jasta 18: The Red Noses (Aviation Elite Units). London, UK: Osprey Publishing. ISBN 978-1849083355.
