= Siemens-Schuckert D.III =

German fighter plane

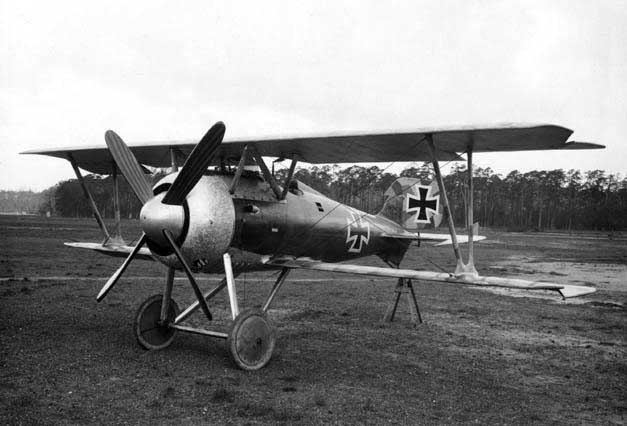

General information
- Type: Fighter
- Manufacturer: Siemens-Schuckert Werke
- Primary user: Luftstreitkräfte

History
- Manufactured: 80
- Introduction date: April 1918
- First flight: October 1917

The Siemens-Schuckert D.III was a German single-seat fighter built by Siemens-Schuckert Werke. The D.III was a development of the earlier Siemens-Schuckert D.IIc prototype. The D.III was an (nearly) equal-span biplane powered by a 160 hp (119 kW) Siemens-Halske Sh.III bi-rotary engine. Idflieg placed an order for 20 aircraft in December 1917, followed by a second order of 30 aircraft in February 1918.

== Operational history ==
Approximately 41 D.IIIs were delivered to frontline units between April and May 1918. Most aircraft were supplied to Jagdgeschwader II, whose pilots were enthusiastic about the new aircraft's handling and rate of climb. After only seven to 10 hours of service, however, the Sh.III engines started showing serious problems with overheating and piston seizure. The problem was later traced to the Voltol mineral oil that was used to replace the now-scarce castor oil. Furthermore, the close-fitting engine cowling provided inadequate cooling to the engine.

In late May 1918, Jagdgeschwader II replaced its D.IIIs with the older Fokker Dr.I. The remaining D.III aircraft were returned to the Siemens-Schuckert factory, where they were retrofitted with new Sh.IIIa engines, an enlarged rudder, and cutaway cowlings that provided improved airflow. A further 30 new production D.IIIs incorporated these modifications. Total production amounted to 80 aircraft.

In July 1918, the D.III returned to active service as an interceptor with home defense squadrons. By this time, the D.III had been replaced in production by the Siemens-Schuckert D.IV.

== Operators ==
German Empire

- Luftstreitkräfte

Switzerland

- Swiss Air Force

== Specifications ==
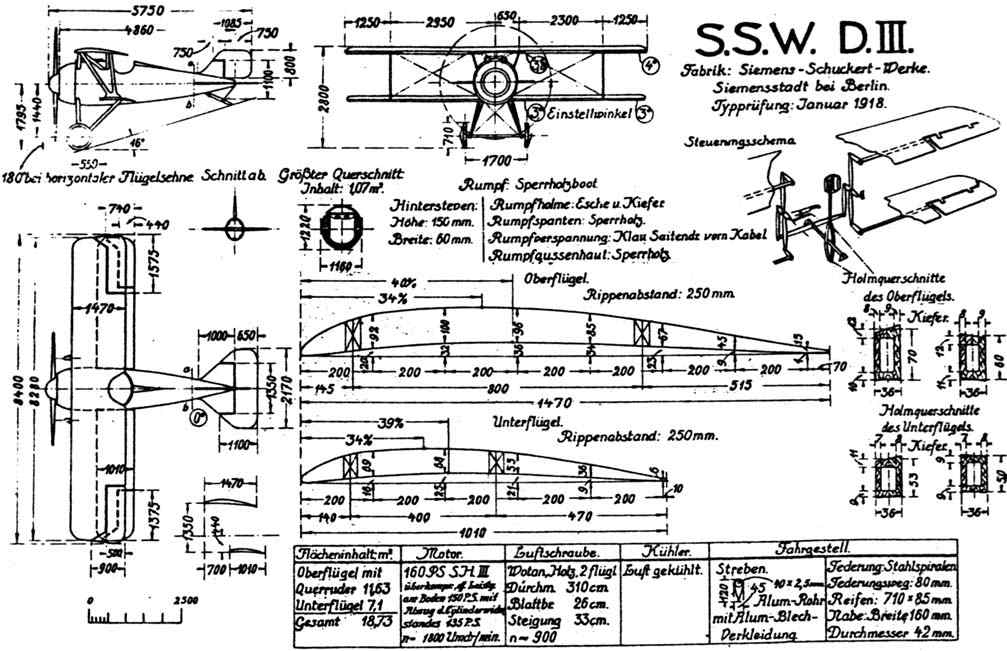
Siemens-Schuckert D.III Baubeschreibung drawing, as submitted to IdFlieg

Data from German Aircraft of the First World War, The Illustrated Encyclopedia of Aircraft (Part Work 1982-1985), The Complete Book of Fighters

General characteristics

- Crew: 1
- Length: 5.7 m (18 ft 8 in)
- Wingspan: 8.43 m (27 ft 8 in)
- Height: 2.8 m (9 ft 2 in)
- Wing area: 18.84 m^{2} (202.8 sq ft)
- Empty weight: 523 kg (1,153 lb)
- Gross weight: 725 kg (1,598 lb)
- Powerplant: 1 × Siemens-Halske Sh.III and Sh.IIIa 11-cylinder contra-rotating air-cooled rotary piston engine, 120 kW (160 hp) 160 kW (210 hp) for take-off
- Propellers: 4-bladed fixed-pitch wooden propeller

Performance

- Maximum speed: 177 km/h (110 mph, 96 kn) at sea level
- Range: 360 km (220 mi, 190 nmi)
- Service ceiling: 8,000 m (26,000 ft)
- Time to altitude: 1,000 m (3,300 ft) in 1 minute 45 seconds

Armament

- Guns: 2×7.92 mm (0.312 in) LMG 08/15 machine-guns
