= Georg von Hantelmann =

WW1 German flying ace (1898–1924)

- Born: 9 October 1898; Rokietnice, Kingdom of Prussia, German Empire (now Poland)
- Died: 7 September 1924 (aged 25); Charcice, Poland
- Military career
- Allegiance: German Empire
- Branch: Hussars; Luftstreitkräfte
- Service years: 1916–1918
- Rank: Leutnant
- Units: 17th Braunschweig "Death's Head" Hussar Regiment; Jagdstaffel 18; Jagdstaffel 15
- Awards: Royal House Order of Hohenzollern; Iron Cross Second and First Class

Georg von Hantelmann (9 October 1898 – 7 September 1924) was a German fighter ace credited with winning 25 victories during World War I. It was notable that these victories included three opposing aces shot down within the same week in September 1918–David Putnam, Maurice Boyau, and Joseph Wehner.

== Early life and service ==
Georg von Hantelmann was born into a minor Junker family on 9 October 1898. He was born in Rokietnice, Kingdom of Prussia, the German Empire (present day Rokietnica, Poland). He was the eldest son. He joined the army in 1916. He was commissioned as a Leutnant on 15 June 1917 before he transferred to aerial service with the Luftstreitkräfte.

== Aerial service ==
Hantelmann began training at Fliegerersatz-Abteilung 9 on 20 September 1917. Upon graduation from this basic aviation training, he moved on to learn to fly a fighter plane at the Jastaschule in Valenciennes, France. His initial assignment as a fighter pilot took him to Jagdstaffel 18, commanded by Rudolf Berthold, on 6 February 1918.

When Berthold changed commands on 18 March 1918 to take charge of Jagdstaffel 15, he took many of his pilots with him in a highly unusual mass exchange of personnel. Hantelmann was one of the pilots who accompanied Berthold to the new unit. Once he arrived at his new squadron, Hantelmann had his personal insignia of a "totenkopf"-style skull and crossbones painted on the fuselage sides of his Albatros D.Va reflected his prior service in the 17th Braunschweig "Death's Head" Hussar Regiment.

Hantelmann posted his first victory claim on 29 May 1918, but it went unconfirmed. Thus, on 6 June when Jasta 15 dived into battle, he was eager for success. As his squadron-mate Joachim von Ziegsar recalled, "Like a steer unbound, the aircraft with the Braunschweig Hussar's crest dived onto the enemy first." A British Airco DH.4 fell before the young Prussian's guns.

It was the first of five wins in June; on the 26th, Hantelmann became an ace. It was during this period that Kurt Wüsthoff borrowed Hantelmann's Fokker and flew his final mission.

Hantlemann scored again on 17 August, but it was his second victory on 12 September 1918 that was notable. Hantlemann shot down American SPAD S.XIII pilot David Putnam, a leading ace of the nascent US Army Air Service who had 13 victories of his own, for victory number eight. Just four days and six wins later, Hantlemann scored an even more notable triumph when he shot down French ace Maurice Boyau, who had a score list of 21 balloons and 14 airplanes. Two days and two victories after that, Hantlemann shot down American ace Joseph Wehner, Frank Luke's wingman, for number 16. The young German ace ended September with 18 victories.

On 21 October 1918, the day of his 22nd confirmed victory, Hantelmann was awarded the Iron Cross First Class, as well as the Royal House Order of Hohenzollern. He was now past the 20 victories then required for the award of Germany's highest decoration for valor, the Pour le Merite. Hantelmann was recommended for the Blue Max on 3 November 1918. However, the German Empire's defeat scotched the award. Nevertheless, Hantlemann ended the war with 25 confirmed and 5 unconfirmed aerial victories. All of his confirmed victories were on the Fokker D.VII, making him one of the most successful pilots in the type.

== Postwar life ==
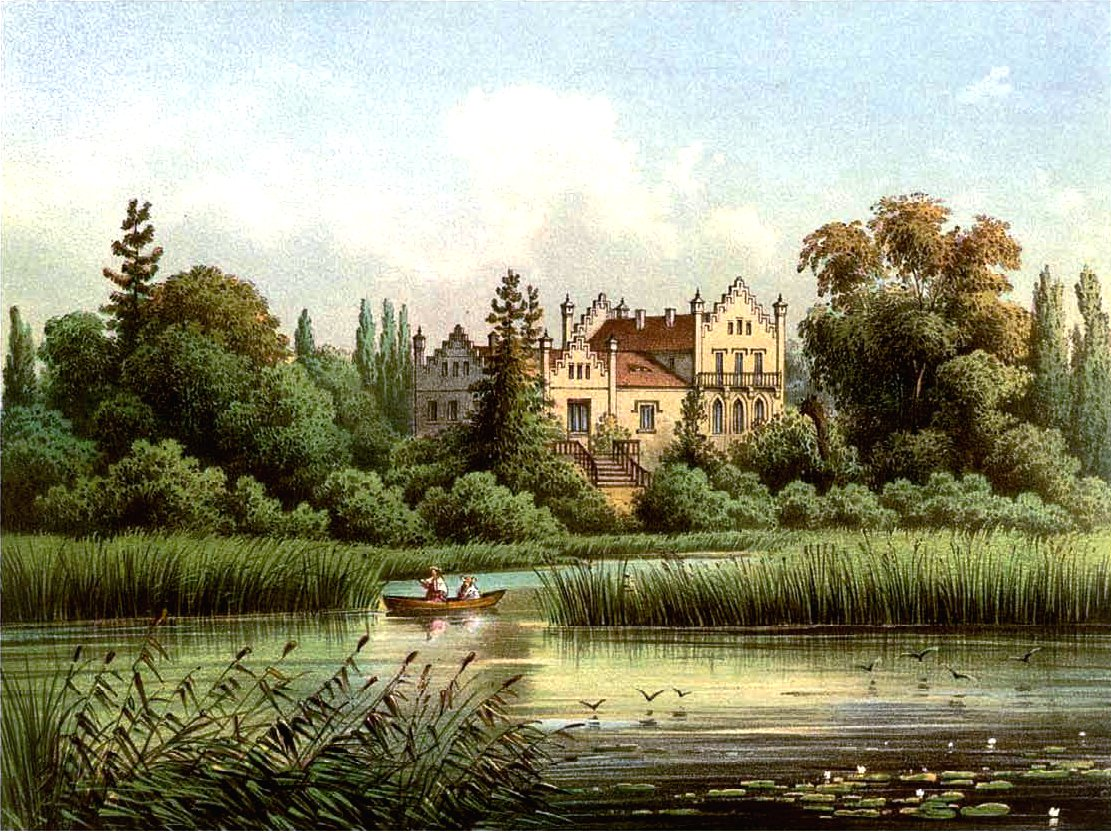
Hantelmann Schloss at Charcice

Hantelmann settled on a farm in Charcice, Prussia. On 8 October 1922 he married Elisabeth Countess Finck von Finckenstein (1904–1981), daughter of Bernhard Graf Finck von Finckenstein (1868–1913, Madlitz branch of the family) and his wife Agneta née von Ramdohr (1875–1919) in the Garrison Church in Potsdam. Their son Wolf-Dietrich von Hantelmann was born in 1923. On 7 September 1924, Polish poachers crossed the nearby border, and murdered Hantelmann when he discovered them trespassing on his property. His wife suffered a miscarriage as the result of his death.
