= Jagdstaffel 18 =

Jasta 18
- "Raven" insignia used by Jasta 18, May 1918 to the Armistice
- Active: 1916–1918
- Country: German Empire
- Branch: Luftstreitkräfte
- Type: Fighter squadron
- Equipment: Albatros D.Va; Pfalz D.III; Fokker Dr.I; Fokker D.VII
- Engagements: World War I

Royal Prussian Jagdstaffel 18 was a "hunting squadron" (fighter squadron) of the Luftstreitkräfte, the air arm of the Imperial German Army during World War I.

== History ==
The Jasta was formed on 30 October 1916, at Halluin under 4th Armee auspices; Oberleutnant Karl von Grieffenhagen transferred in from Jasta 1 to take command. It deactivated at war's end, having existed some 25 months.

== Personnel ==
Jasta 18's Staffelfuhrer (also Jastaführer, Commanding officers) were:

1. Oberleutnant Karl von Grieffenhagen: 30 October 1916 – 12 August 1917
2. Oberleutnant Rudolf Berthold: 12 August 1917 – 10 October 1917
3. Oberleutnant Ernst Turck: 10 October 1917 – March 1918
4. Leutnant der Reserve August Raben: 14 March 1918 – November 1918

A dozen flying aces served within its ranks, including Berthold, Hans Müller, Walter von Bülow-Bothkamp, Wilhelm Kühne, Paul Strähle, Harald Auffarth, Joseph Veltjens, and Johannes Klein. After Raben took command, aces such as Wilhelm Kühne and Kurt Adolf Monnington served with the unit, with Hans Müller among those who moved from Jasta 15 along with Raben. During the course of the war, the Jasta suffered eight killed in action, eleven wounded, and one taken prisoner.

== Aircraft and operations ==
Its initial operational aircraft was the Albatros D.III fighter and sometime later, the Fokker Dr.I triplane. Its theater of operations was the Western Front.

The new unit mobilized on 8 January 1917. Fifteen days later, it was credited with the first of its 112 confirmed victories during the war. It moved to Marckebeke and Harlebeke airfields. On 23 November 1917, it moved to Avelin to work for the 6th Army.

In the spring of 1918, Berthold was promoted to command the Prussian Jagdgeschwader II wing, consisting of the Prussian Jagdstaffeln 12, 13, 15 and 19. Berthold wanted to take his old squadron with him and make it part of the wing, but this was disallowed. On 19 March 1918, he engineered a wholesale swap of pilots between Jasta 18 and Jasta 15 as a means of taking the pilots he knew with him. The exchange took place at Guise, in the 18th Armee area of operations. About this time, Leutnant der Reserve August Raben transferred in from Jasta 15 to take command on 14 March 1918. On 8 April 1918, he led the reconstituted squadron back to Avelines Airfield; they would henceforth refer to themselves as the "Staffel Raben", and changed to a new color scheme from the change in command, abandoning the red/blue fuselages of the formerly Berthold-led unit. The new color scheme adopted by the squadron, already equipped with the Albatros D.Va and even a few Pfalz D.IIIas and applied to those veteran fighter designs, also appeared on the Fokker D.VIIs in its service, as the new Fokker fighter rapidly began to replace the earlier aircraft. The new unit livery for Raben's Jasta 18 began to appear by the end of April 1918, and consisted of a white rear fuselage and all-white tail surfaces, with vermilion red forward of the cockpit and on the wings' upper surfaces, and usually left the bare wing panels' undersides unpainted, showing their printed lozenge camouflage. The squadron's main unit insignia consisted of a stenciled black raven, similar in appearance to what Raben himself had used on his own fighter aircraft while previously serving with Jagdstaffel 39, on just about all of the squadron's aircraft fuselage sides on the white rear area, with varying personal insignia added in black, usually along with the raven. The only Jasta 18 aircraft ever to feature a white raven instead were August Raben's own Fokker D.VII, and a later Fokker Dr.I he personally used, with the red area on the fuselages of both aircraft extended rearwards to end much closer to the stabilizer's leading edge. The unit would move on to assignments at Faches-Thumesnil and Lomme in the 6th Army zone of operations. On 14 June, it moved to support of 19th Armee, it moved to Montingen, near Metz for the remainder of the war, in opposing the efforts of the British Independent Air Force in the 19th Armee's sector, with Jasta 18 being by far the most experienced fighter squadron in the area. Jasta 18's efforts in resisting the British IAF bomber forces were achieved alongside Jagdstaffel 80 sharing Jasta 18's area of operations; with Jagdstaffel 70 and the Bavarian Jagdstaffel 78 immediately south, and the Württemberg Jagdstaffel 64 and Jagdstaffel 65 immediately north. A few KEST (Kampfeinsitzer Staffel)-designation units also existed in the 19th Armee area, as home defense fighter units.

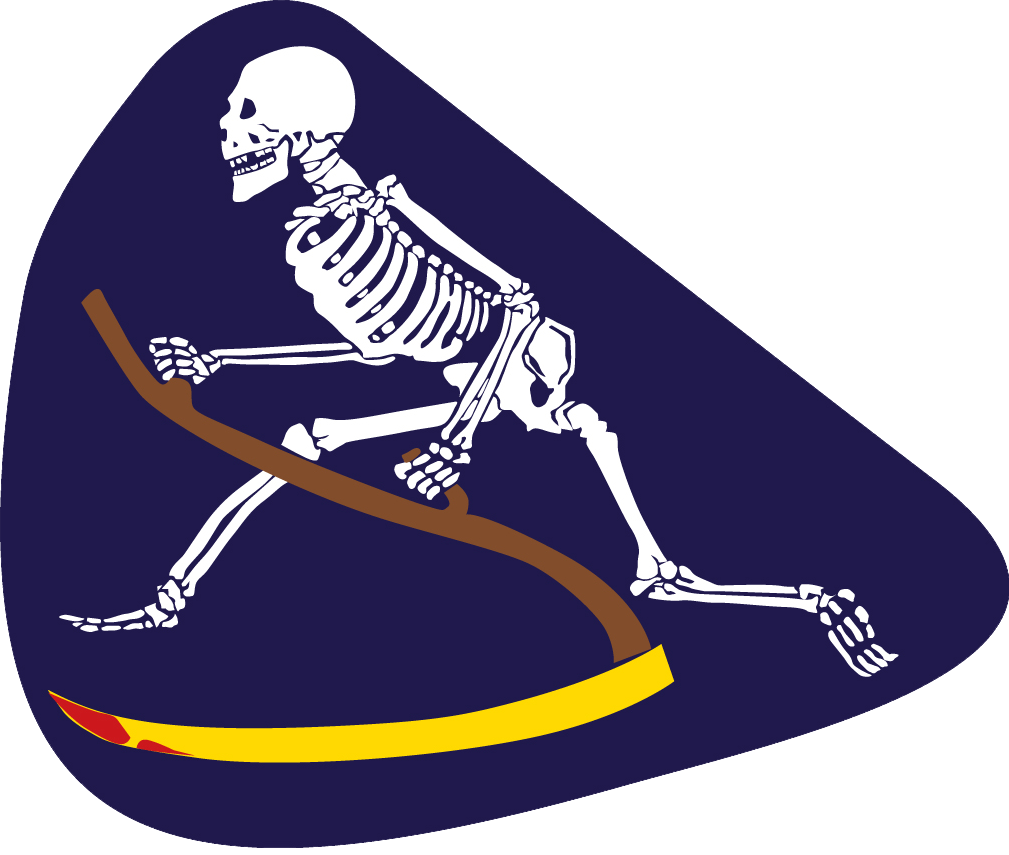
The macabre "Grim Oscar" insignia of the USAAS' 13th Aero Squadron, an opposing unit to Jasta 18, Sept-Nov. 1918.

While still based at Lomme, the Staffel Raben would also see action for the first time against American pilots of the USAAS starting in the second half of May 1918, specifically the American "inheritor unit" of the French Lafayette Escadrille of largely American personnel, the 103d Aero Squadron. By early autumn 1918, after the final move to Montingen, the aerial actions undertaken between the USAAS and the Luftstreitkräfte over the Battle of Saint-Mihiel pitted Jasta 18 against the macabre-marked USAAS' 13th Aero Squadron and their Grim Oscar-bearing SPAD XIII fighters, with the two units tangling a number of times from the St. Mihiel offensive onwards to the Armistice.
