= Mulzer =

Mulzer is a German surname. Notable people with the surname include:

- Johann Mulzer (born 1944), German chemist
- Josef-Georg Mulzer (1915–2011), German Wehrmacht officer
- Max Ritter von Mulzer (1893–1916), German World War I flying ace

== See also ==
- Muller
