= Fritz Jacobsen =

Fritz John Jacobsen
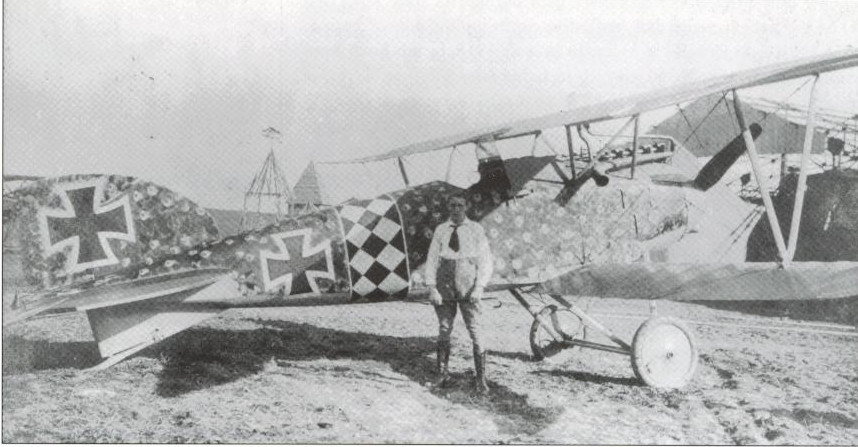
- Fritz Jacobsen's Albatros D.V. Summer 1917, before his transfer to Italy.
- Born: 7 July 1894; Berlin-Charlottenburg, German Empire
- Died: 3 August 1981 (aged 87); Nuremberg, West Germany
- Military career
- Allegiance: Germany
- Branch: Aviation
- Rank: Vizefeldwebel
- Units: Flieger-Abteilung (Flier Detachment) 9; Jagdstaffel 9 (Fighter Squadron 9), Jagdstaffel 17; Jagdstaffel 31; Jagdstaffel 73
- Conflicts: World War I
- Awards: Iron Cross

Vizefeldwebel Fritz John Jacobsen was a German World War I flying ace credited with eight confirmed and two unconfirmed aerial victories.

== Biography ==
Fritz John Jacobsen was born on 21 May 1896 in Berlin-Charlottenburg, the German Empire. He became interested in aviation in 1909, while he was in his early teens. By 1914, he was piloting Etrich Taube aircraft at Johannisthal Air Field near Berlin. He qualified as a test pilot and instructor before joining der Fliegertruppen (the flying troops) for his World War I military service. Once inducted, he was the Chief Pilot of Armee Flugpark (Army Flight Park) II in early 1915 despite his youth. In May 1915, he was posted to Flieger-Abteilung (Flier Detachment) I.

On 11 November 1916, he joined a fighter squadron, Jagdstaffel 17. The following month, he served a brief spell with Jagdstaffel 9 before transferring yet again on 15 December 1916, this time to Jagdstaffel 31. Jacobsen scored his first aerial victory with them, downing a Bristol F.2b Fighter from 48 Squadron at 1050 hours 6 July 1917 over Sailly. Jacobsen would score a second aerial victory against a 70 Squadron Sopwith Camel over Linselles at 0752 hours on 19 August 1917. He also had a claim in for 28 September, which went unconfirmed; he had been shot down at the end of that fray. In October 1917, Jasta 31 and Jacobsen transferred from France to Italy. On 26 October 1917, Jacobsen was again shot down after a combat resulting in his unconfirmed claim of an Italian Caproni bomber.

Jasta 31 returned to France in February 1918, and Jacobsen went with them, but on 5 March he transferred to Jagdstaffel 73. Between 30 May and 4 September 1918, he shot down five more opposing airplanes and an observation balloon. He was awarded both the Second and First Classes of the Iron Cross. Jacobsen survived the war.

Fritz John Jacobsen died in Nürnberg, Germany on 3 August 1981.
