= Hartmuth Baldamus =

German World War I flying ace

- Born: 10 August 1891; Dresden, Kingdom of Saxony, German Empire
- Died: 14 April 1917 (aged 25); Sainte-Marie-à-Py, France
- Military career
- Allegiance: German Empire
- Branch: Aviation
- Rank: Leutnant (Second Lieutenant)
- Units: Feldflieger Abteilung 20 (Field Flier Detachment 20); Jagdstaffel 5 (Fighter Squadron 5); Jagdstaffel 9 (Fighter Squadron 9)
- Awards: Royal House Order of Hohenzollern; Iron Cross First and Second Class; Albert Order, Knight Second Class

Leutnant Hartmuth Baldamus (10 August 1891 – 14 April 1917) was a German flying ace in World War I, credited with 18 aerial victories.

== Early life ==
Hartmuth Baldamus (sometimes rendered as Hartmut) was born in Dresden on 10 August 1891.

== World War I service ==
Baldamus was in German aviation from the start of the First World War. Ranked as a Gefreiter, he flew a two-seater reconnaissance airplane for Feldflieger Abteilung 20 (Field Flier Detachment 20) beginning 29 March 1915. On 20 September 1915, he was commissioned a Leutnant. By the end of 1915, Baldamus had been awarded the Albert Order, Knight Second Class.

He scored his first aerial victory on 15 March 1916; he scored his fifth confirmed victory on 29 July 1916, though details of some of his earlier wins are missing. Having performed the rather unusual feat of becoming an ace before being assigned to a fighter squadron, Baldamus was now posted to fly fighters with Jagdstaffel 5 (Fighter Squadron 5) on 27 August 1916. He moved on to Jagdstaffel 9 (Fighter Squadron 9) in early November 1916. On 2 December he closed out 1916 with nine victories.

The requirement for winning the Pour le Mérite had been set at eight victories for the very earliest German aces, the so-called Fokker Scourge. Now, as Baldamus seemed to qualify, the requirement was raised out of his reach. However, he did receive the prestigious Knight's Cross with Swords of the Royal Hohenzollern House Order on 8 January 1917. (Note: As victories and aces proliferated in the wake of the Fokker Scourge, the victory total needed for the Pour le Mérite was raised to 20. Other prerequisites for the Blue Max were the prior awards of both classes of the Iron Cross and the Royal House Order of Hohenzollern.)

Baldamus resumed scoring on 23 January 1917, and steadily achieved more single victories, reaching 17 on 12 April 1917. Two days later, at 1140 hours, Hartmut Baldamus slammed into a midair collision with the French Nieuport 17 serial 2539 of Escadrille N37 piloted by Caporal Simon. Baldamus crashed to his death near Sainte-Marie-à-Py. Simon counted as Baldamus' 18th victory.
