= Max Immelmann =

German World War I flying ace (1890–1916)

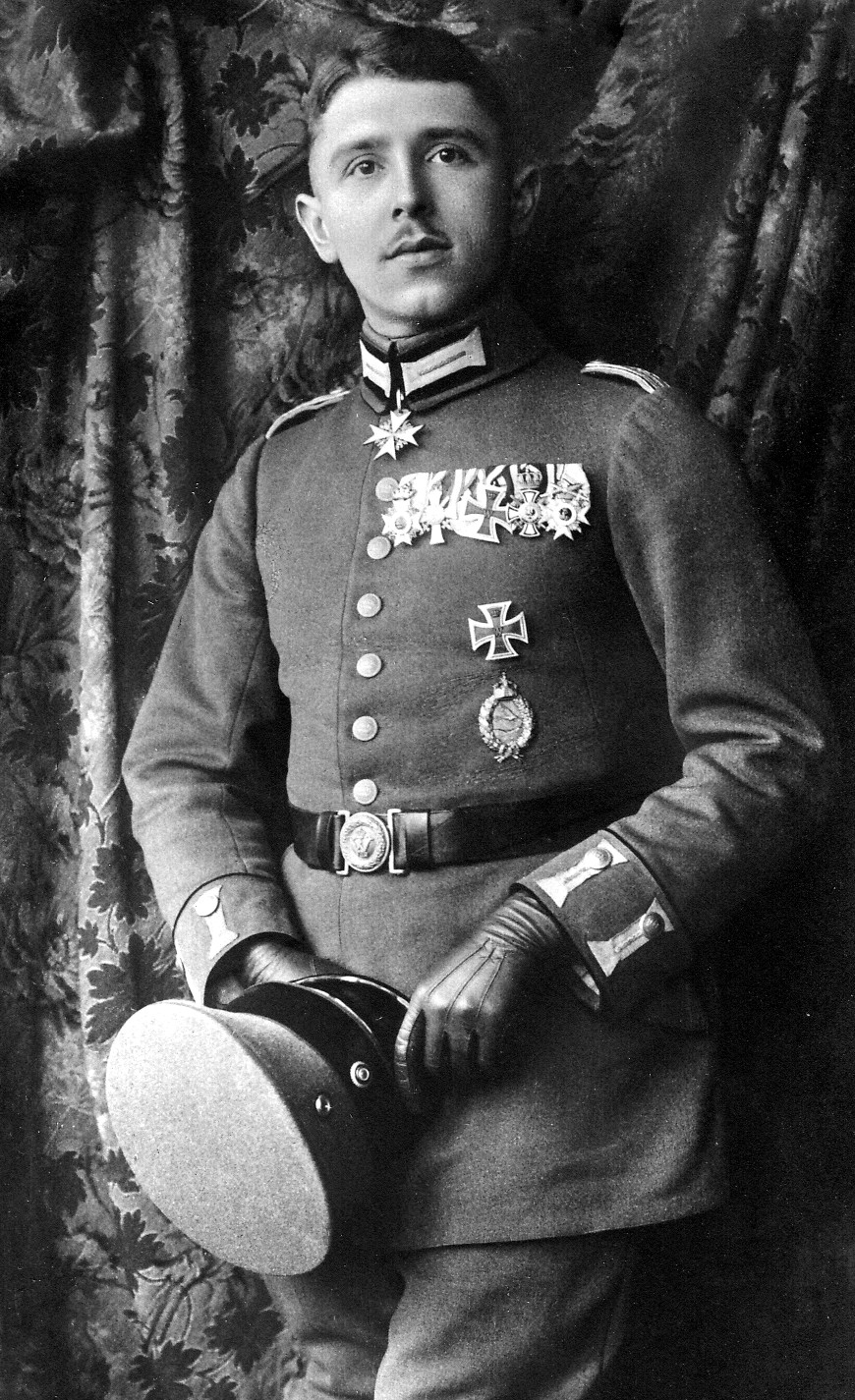
- Immelmann in 1916
- Born: 21 September 1890; Dresden, Kingdom of Saxony, German Empire
- Died: 18 June 1916 (aged 25); Lens, Pas-de-Calais, France
- Military career
- Allegiance: German Empire
- Branch: Imperial German Army; Die Fliegertruppen des deutschen Kaiserreiches (Imperial German Army Air Service)
- Service years: 1911–1912 (Army); 1914–1916 (Army Air Service)
- Rank: Oberleutnant
- Nickname: Der Adler von Lille (The Eagle of Lille)
- Units: Eisenbahnregiment Nr. 2, Eisenbahnregiment Nr. 1, FEA 2, FFA 10, FAA 62
- Awards: Prussia: Pour le Mérite Iron Cross, First Class Iron Cross, Second Class Knight's Cross with Swords of the Royal House Order of Hohenzollern; Saxony: Military Order of St. Henry, Commander's Cross Military Order of St. Henry, Knight's Cross Albert Order, Knight 2nd Class with Swords Silver Friedrich August Medal; Bavaria: Military Merit Order 4th Class with Swords; Anhalt: Friedrich Cross; Hamburg: Hanseatic Cross; Germany: Army Pilot's Badge

Max Immelmann (21 September 1890 – 18 June 1916) PLM was a German World War I flying ace. He was a pioneer in fighter aviation and is often mistakenly credited with the first aerial victory using a synchronized gun, which was in fact achieved on 1 July 1915 by the German ace Kurt Wintgens. Immelmann was the first aviator to receive the Pour le Mérite, colloquially known as the "Blue Max" in his honour, being awarded it at the same time as Oswald Boelcke. His name has become attached to a common flying tactic, the Immelmann turn, and remains a byword in aviation. He is credited with 15 aerial victories.

== Early life ==
Max Immelmann was born on 21 September 1890, in Dresden, to an industrialist father who died when Max was young. In 1905 he was enrolled in the Dresden Cadet School. He joined the Eisenbahnregiment (Railway Regiment) Nr. 2 in 1911 as an ensign, in pursuit of a commission.

He left the army in March 1912 to study mechanical engineering in Dresden. He returned to service at the outbreak of war in 1914, as a reserve officer candidate. Assigned to Eisenbahnregiment Nr. 1, he soon transferred to aviation.

== Wartime career ==
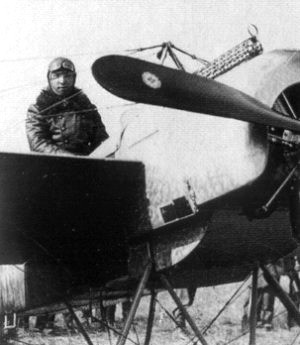
Immelmann's first Eindecker, E.13/15

When World War I started, Immelmann was called to active service, transferred to the German Army's air arm, Die Fliegertruppe des Deutschen Kaiserreiches (later known as the Luftstreitkräfte) and was sent for pilot training at Johannisthal Air Field in November 1914. He was initially stationed in northern France.

Immelmann served as a pilot with Feldflieger Abteilung (Field Flier Detachment) 10 from February to April 1915, and then in FFA 62 by early May 1915. On several occasions he engaged in combat while flying the L.V.G. two-seaters with which his units were equipped, but never with any success. On 3 June 1915, he was shot down by a French pilot, but managed to land safely behind German lines. Immelmann was decorated with the Iron Cross, Second Class, for preserving his aircraft.

Two very early examples of the Fokker Eindecker fighters were delivered to the unit, one Fokker M.5K/MG production prototype numbered E.3/15 for Oswald Boelcke's use, with Immelmann later in July receiving E.13/15 as a production Fokker E.I for his own use before the end of July 1915. It was with the E.13/15 aircraft, armed with the synchronized lMG 08 Spandau machine gun, that Immelmann gained his first confirmed air victory of the war on 1 August 1915, a fortnight after Leutnant Kurt Wintgens obtained the very first confirmed German aerial victory on 15 July 1915 with his own Fokker M.5K/MG production prototype E.5/15 Eindecker, one of five built, following two unconfirmed ones on 1 and 4 July, all before Immelmann:

Like a hawk, I dived ... and fired my machine gun. For a moment, I believed I would fly right into him. I had fired about 60 shots when my gun jammed. That was awkward, for to clear the jam I needed both hands – I had to fly completely without hands ...

Lieutenant William Reid fought back valiantly, flying with his left hand and firing a pistol with his right. Nonetheless, the 450 bullets fired at him took their effect; Reid suffered four wounds in his left arm, and his airplane's engine quit, causing a crash landing. The unarmed Immelmann landed nearby, and approached Reid; they shook hands and Immelmann said to the British pilot "You are my prisoner" and pulled Reid out of the wreckage and rendered first aid.

Immelmann became one of the first German fighter pilots, quickly building an impressive score of air victories. During September, three more victories followed, and then in October he became solely responsible for the air defense of the city of Lille. Immelmann became known as The Eagle of Lille (Der Adler von Lille).

Immelmann flirted with the position of Germany's leading ace, trading that spot off with Oswald Boelcke, another pioneer ace. Having come second to Boelcke for his sixth victory, he was second to be awarded the Royal House Order of Hohenzollern for this feat. On 15 December, Immelmann shot down his seventh British plane and moved into an unchallenged lead in the competition to be Germany's leading ace.

Immelmann was the first pilot to be awarded the Pour le Mérite, Germany's highest military honour, receiving it on the day of his eighth win, 12 January 1916. The medal became unofficially known as the "Blue Max" in the German Air Service in honour of Immelmann. His medal was presented by Kaiser Wilhelm II on 12 January 1916. Oswald Boelcke received his medal at the same time.

Boelcke scored again two days later. Immelmann would chase him in the ace race for the next four months, drawing even on 13 March at 11 each, losing the lead on 19 March, regaining it on Easter Sunday (23 April) 14 to 13, losing it again forever on 1 May. It was about this time, on 25 April, that Immelmann received a salutary lesson in the improvement of British aircraft. As the German ace described his attack on two Airco DH.2s, "The two worked splendidly together ... and put 11 shots into my machine. The petrol tank, the struts on the fuselage, the undercarriage and the propeller were hit ... It was not a nice business."

On 31 May, Immelmann, Max von Mulzer, and another German pilot attacked a formation of seven British aircraft. Immelmann was flying a two-gun Fokker E.IV, and when he opened fire, the synchronizing gear malfunctioned. A stream of bullets cut off the tip of a propeller blade. The thrashing of the unbalanced air screw nearly shook the aircraft's twin-row Oberursel U.III engine loose from its mounts before he could cut the ignition and glide to a dead-stick landing.

== Death ==
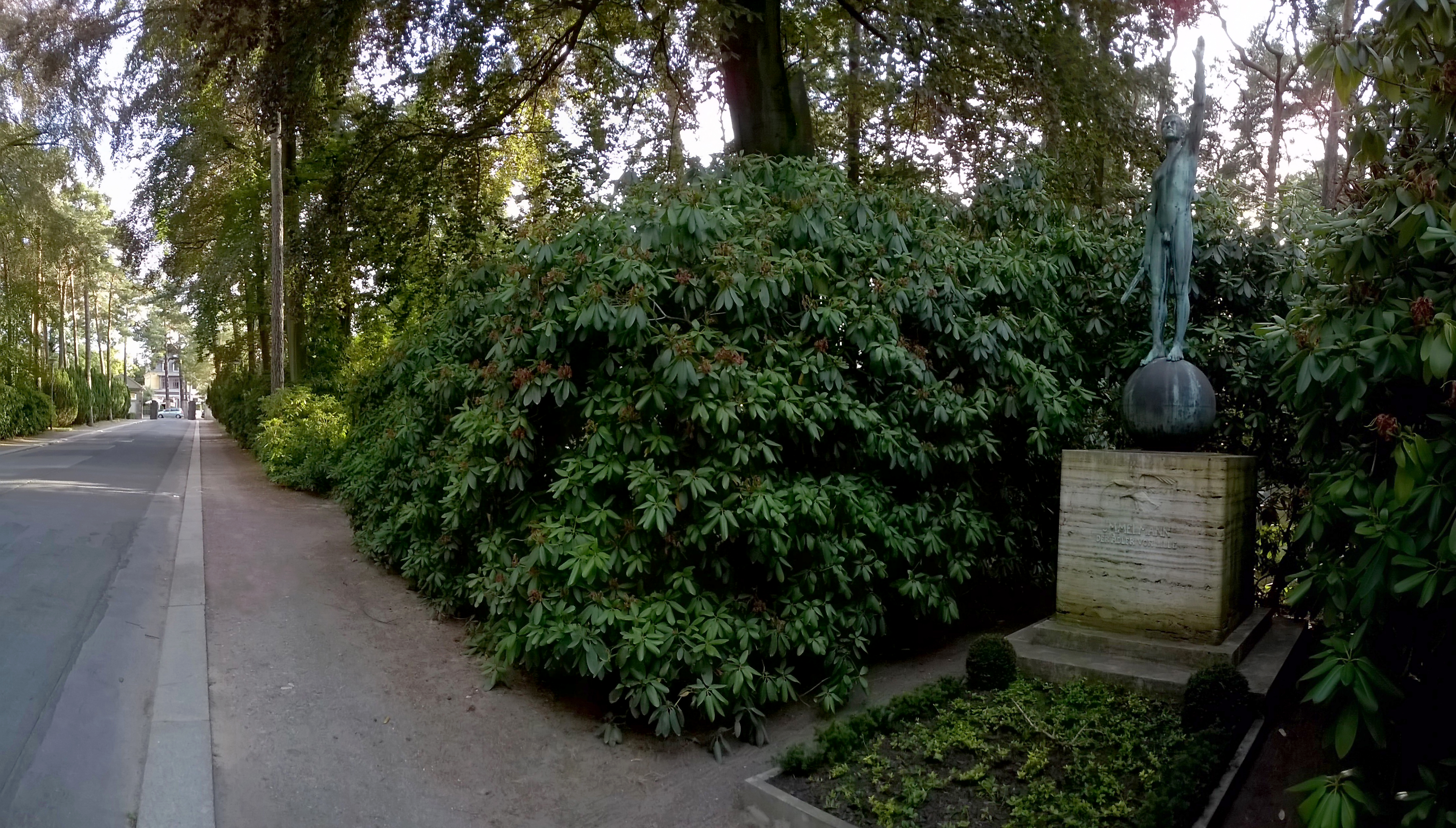
Tomb – Max Immelmann – Dresden Tolkewitz

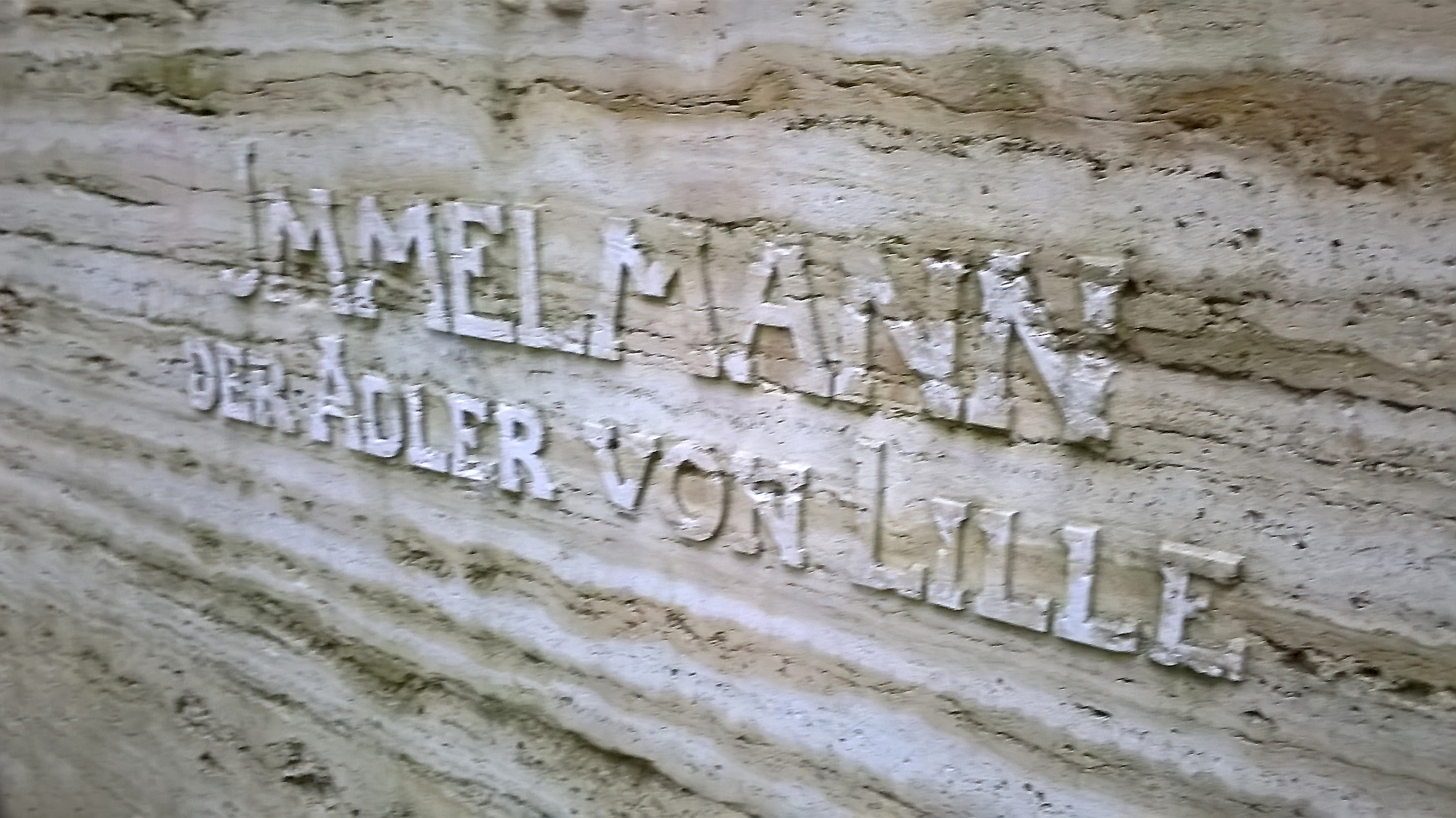
"Der Adler von Lille" – Tomb Immelmann – Dresden –

In the late afternoon of 18 June 1916, Immelmann led a flight of four Fokker E.III Eindeckers in search of a flight of eight F.E.2b fighter/reconnaissance aircraft of 25 Squadron Royal Flying Corps over Sallaumines in northern France. The British flight had just crossed the lines near Arras, with the intent of photographing the German infantry and artillery positions within the area, when Immelmann's flight intercepted them. After a long-running fight, scattering the participants over an area of some 80 square kilometres (30 sq mi), Immelmann brought down one of the enemy aircraft, wounding both the pilot and observer. This was his 16th victory claim, though it went unconfirmed.

At 21:45 that same evening, Immelmann in Fokker E.III, serial 246/16 encountered No. 25 Squadron again, this time near the village of Lens. Immediately, he got off a burst, which hit RFC Lt. J. R. B. Savage, pilot of F.E.2b pusher serial 4909, mortally wounding him. This was his 17th victory claim, though Max Mulzer was later credited with the victory. The second aircraft he closed on was piloted by Second Lieutenant G. R. McCubbin, with Corporal J. H. Waller as gunner/observer.

McCubbin was credited by the British with shooting Immelmann down. On the German side, many had seen Immelmann as invincible and could not conceive the notion that he had fallen to enemy fire. Meanwhile, British authorities awarded McCubbin the Distinguished Service Order and the Distinguished Service Medal and sergeant's stripes for Waller.

The German Air Service at the time said the loss was due to friendly anti-aircraft fire. Others, including Immelmann's brother, believed his aircraft's gun synchronisation, designed to enable his machine gun to fire between the whirling propeller blades without damaging them, had malfunctioned with catastrophic results. Early versions of such gears frequently malfunctioned in this way and this had happened to Immelmann twice before, while testing two- and three-machine gun installations. On each occasion, he had been able to land safely.

McCubbin, in a 1935 interview, said that immediately after Immelmann shot down McCubbin's squadron-mate, the German ace began an Immelmann turn, McCubbin and Waller descended from a greater altitude and opened fire, shooting down Immelmann. Waller pointed out later that the British bullets could have hit Immelmann's propeller.

Damage to the propeller resulting in the loss of one blade could have been the primary cause of the structural failure, evident in accounts of the crash of his aircraft. The resultant vibration of an engine at full throttle spinning half a propeller could have shaken the fragile craft to pieces. At 2,000 metres, the tail was seen to break away from the rest of Immelmann's Fokker. The wings detached or folded, and what remained of the fuselage fell straight down. Immelmann's body was recovered by the German 6 Armee from the twisted wreckage, lying lifeless over what was left of the surprisingly intact Oberursel engine, sometimes cited as under it. His body was identified by his initials embroidered on his handkerchief.

Immelmann was given a state funeral and buried in his home city of Dresden. His body was later exhumed and cremated in the Dresden-Tolkewitz Crematorium; during the funeral, on June 26, 1916, Zeppelin Z IV flew over the crematorium, dropping two bouquets of roses from its gondolas.

Immelmann, along with Max Ritter von Mulzer, scored all of his victories flying different types of Eindeckers, becoming one of the most successful pilots in the type.

== Grave robbery and desecration ==
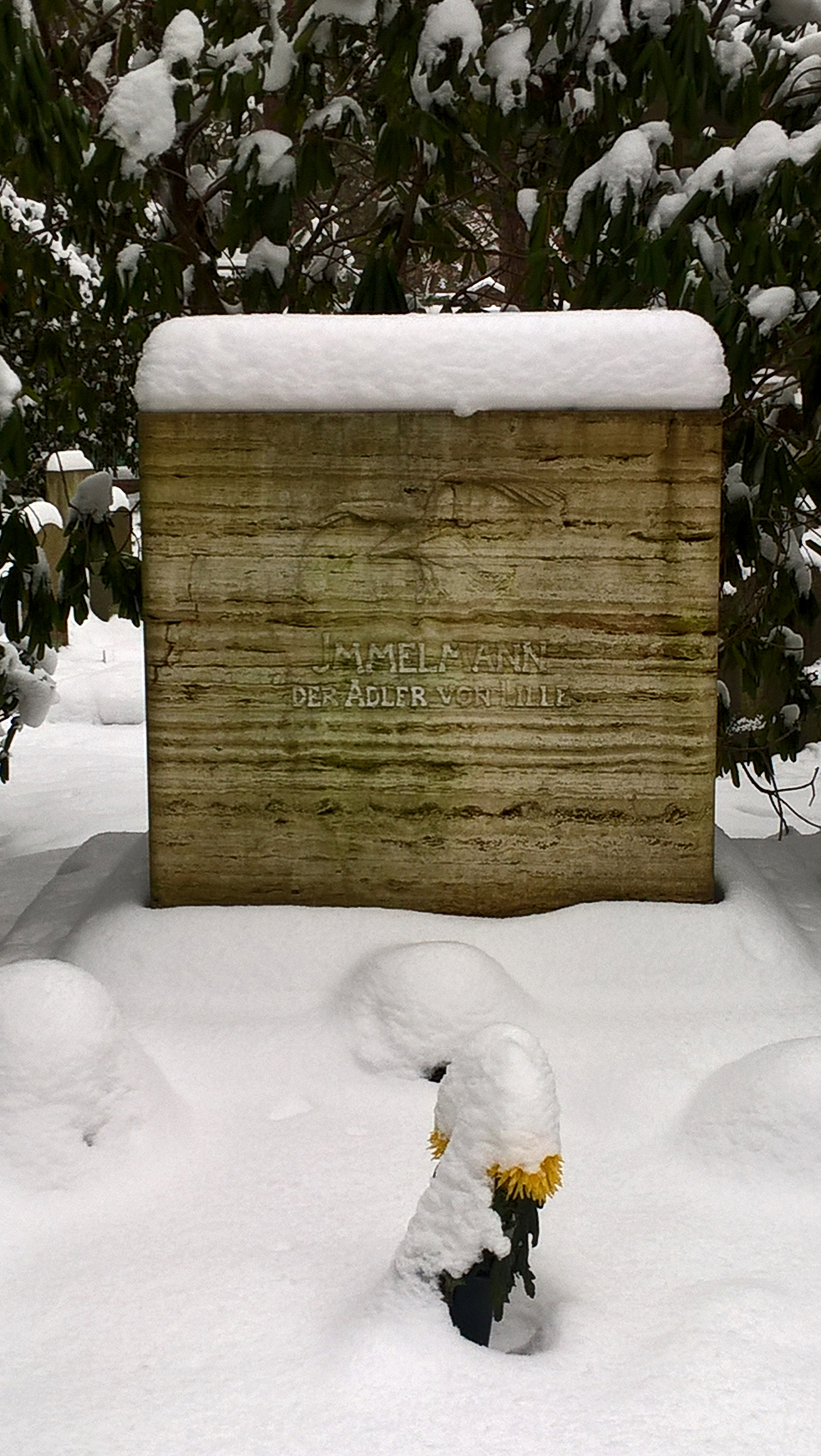
The grave following the robbery and desecration

During the night of Sunday 31 January 2021, Max Immelmann's memorial grave in Tolkewitz was robbed and desecrated. The Pöppelmann grave figure "Eagle of Lille", weighing around 100 kilograms, and approximately 180 centimetres in height, was dismantled and taken away by two men using a handcart to transport it to a pick-up truck parked nearby.

A local resident observed the robbery and informed the police, who also investigated the two suspects in connection with other thefts. The public prosecutor's office in Dresden, which brought charges against the alleged perpetrators, estimated the value of the grave figure at around 50,000 euros. After restoration the figure was returned to Immelmann's grave.

A number of historically significant First World War artefacts were stolen from the graves of soldiers in the Tolkewitz cemetery during 2021, with a suspicion of possible "theft to order".

== Legacy ==
The present-day Luftwaffe has dubbed Squadron AG-51 the "Immelmann Squadron" in his honour.

== Promotion record and regimental assignments ==
- Cadet, Dresden Cadet School, 1905–1912
- Fähnrich mit Portepee (Swordknot Ensign), Eisenbahn-Regiment Nr 2 (2nd Railway Regiment), 4 April 1911
- Pilot in training, Aviation Replacements Section, 12 November 1914 – 31 March 1915; received Imperial German Pilot's Badge
- Assigned, FA (Flieger-Abteilung) 10, Die Fliegertruppen des deutschen Kaiserreiches (Flying Section 10, Imperial German Flying Corps), February – 28 April 1915
- Assigned, FA 62, 28 April 1915 – 1916
- Leutnant (Second Lieutenant), Royal Saxony Army Reserves, 14 July 1915
- ("Full") Oberleutnant, Royal Saxon Army (active list), April 1916 (Note: In a letter to his mother, dated 24 April 1916, Immelmann described his regular army commission as "a promotion from subaltern to full lieutenant.")

== Orders and medals ==
Kingdom of Saxony

- Military Order of St. Henry, Knight Commander, 30 March 1916, after his 12th and 13th victories
- Military Order of St. Henry, Knight, 21 September 1915
- Albert Order, Knight's Cross with Swords
- Silver Friedrich August Medal, "For Gallantry in the Face of the Enemy", 15 July 1915

Kingdom of Prussia / German Empire

- Pour le Mérite, 12 January 1916, after his eighth victory
- Iron Cross, First Class, 1 August 1915, after his first victory
- Iron Cross, Second Class, 3 June 1915, after flying a successful reconnaissance mission with Lt. von Teubern (observer)
- Royal House Order of Hohenzollern, Knight's Cross with Swords, November 1915

Miscellaneous German

- Hanseatic Cross (Hamburg), 15 March 1916, after flying aerial defense for the Mayor of Hamburg
- Military Merit Order (Bavaria), Fourth Class, ca. 6–12 December 1915

Other

- The Turkish War Medal of 1915 (Ottoman Empire), April/May 1916 (Note: In his last letter to his mother, dated 18 May 1916, the Turkish War Medal of 1915 was also known as the "Gallipoli Star" among Commonwealth nations and in Germany, it was frequently referred to as the "Eiserner Halbmond" ("Iron Crescent") as it functioned as the Ottoman equivalent to the Iron Cross.)
- Imtiyaz Medal in Silver (Ottoman Empire), April/May 1916 (Note: In his last letter to his mother, dated 18 May 1916, Immelmann mistakenly referred to it as the "Imbias Medal in Silver", due either to a simple misspelling or misinterpretation of language. The medal bears no western verbiage, and he was likely attempting to decipher the award document (also mentioned in his letter) that were, of course, written in Turkish, using Arabic script .)

== Fokker Eindecker ==
Immelmann will forever be associated with the Fokker Eindecker, Germany's first fighter aircraft, and the first such aircraft to be armed with a machine gun synchronised to fire forward, through the propeller arc. Immelmann, along with Oswald Boelcke and other pilots, was one of the main exponents of the Fokker Eindecker, resulting in the Fokker Scourge which inflicted heavy losses upon British and French aircrews during 1915.

Initially, Immelmann shared the same E.3/15 machine with Oswald Boelcke, but late in the summer of 1915 would receive his own machine, bearing the IdFlieg serial number E.13/15 on its fuselage. Both these E.3/15 machine earlier shared with Boelcke, and his own E.13/15 aircraft, both used to secure Immelmann's first five victories between them each had a seven-cylinder 80 horsepower Oberursel U.0 rotary engine for their power. According to Immelmann, the latter E.13/15 aircraft was retired and shipped off to Berlin for display at the Zeughaus Museum, in March 1916, but was wrecked in the first bombing raids of the Royal Air Force in 1940, during World War II.

== The Immelmann turn ==
This refers to two quite different aerobatic maneuvers. The first of these is the one now known as an "Immelmann" (also frequently spelled "Immelman", in literature and media).

1. A half loop followed by a half roll on top, used to rapidly reverse the direction of flight. This maneuver may not have been practical in the primitive, underpowered fighters of 1915–1916, and its connection with the German fighter ace is doubtful. (Note: Among other characteristics required for the performance of an "Immelmann" in the modern aerobatic sense is very precise lateral (roll) control – see Wheeler (especially Chapter IV, pp 27–35) for a discussion of the lack of this degree of control in early aircraft, especially wire-braced monoplanes.)
2. During World War I, an "Immelmann turn" was actually a sharp rudder turn off a vertical zoom climb (almost to a full stall) or modified chandelle followed by a steep dive. Immelmann may very well have originated this maneuver, or at least used it in combat, although this cannot be authenticated.

== See also ==
- Aerobatics
- Flying Ace
- Fokker Eindecker
- Fokker Scourge
- Oswald Boelcke
- Pour le Mérite
- Immelmann turn
- Immelmann Loop
- Kurt Wintgens
