= George McCubbin =

South African cricketer and WWI pilot

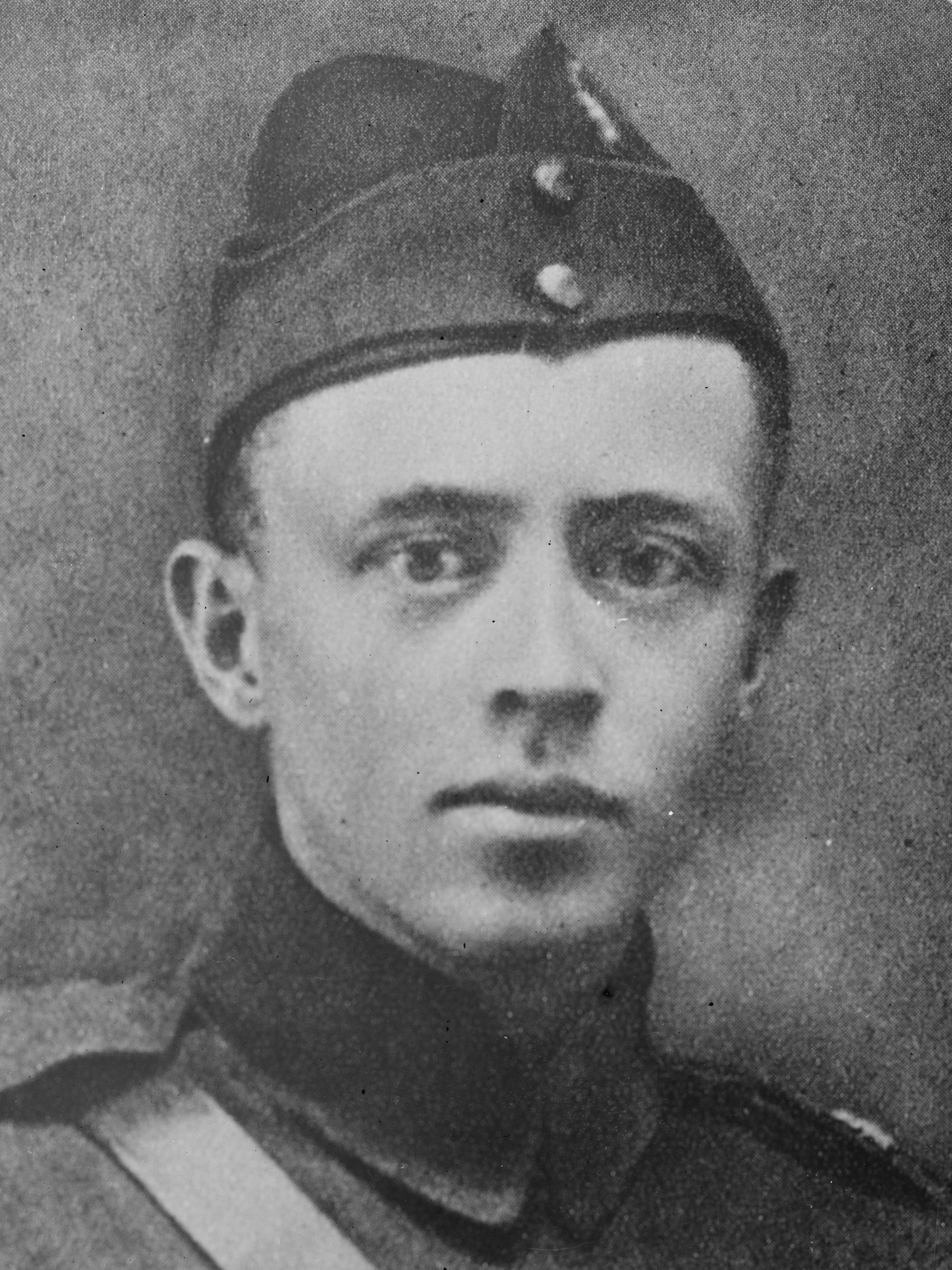
- McCubbin pictured in 1917 as a lieutenant
- Born: 18 January 1898; Cape Town, Cape Colony
- Died: 9 May 1944 (aged 46); Johannesburg, Transvaal, Union of South Africa
- Military career
- Allegiance: United Kingdom
- Branch: Royal Flying Corps
- Service years: 1916–1919
- Rank: Captain
- Conflicts: World War I World War II
- Awards: Distinguished Service Order

George Reynolds McCubbin DSO (18 January 1898 – 9 May 1944) was a South African Royal Flying Corps (RFC) pilot who shot down the German ace Max Immelmann.

Born in South Africa, McCubbin joined the British Empire forces in the East African campaign after the outbreak of the First World War. He later joined the RFC as a mechanic, before being selected for pilot training. He received his aviator's certificate in March 1916 and shot down Immelmann in a dogfight on 18 June. For this, and an earlier occasion when his aircraft shot down a German plane, McCubbin was awarded the Distinguished Service Order. He later served as a staff officer, reaching the rank of captain. After the war McCubbin returned to South Africa where he played two games of first-class cricket for Transvaal against Rhodesia in 1923. McCubbin set a national record for a ninth-wicket stand that stood until at least 1999. McCubbin served in the South African Air Force during the Second World War before ill health forced his retirement.

== Early life ==
George McCubbin was born on 19 January 1898 at Cape Town in the Cape Colony. His parents were Lucy and David Aitken McCubbin, who was the Liverpool-born chief architect for South African Railways. McCubbin was educated at King Edward VII School in Johannesburg. He was captain of the school's football first XI and vice-captain of the cricket team.

== Military career ==
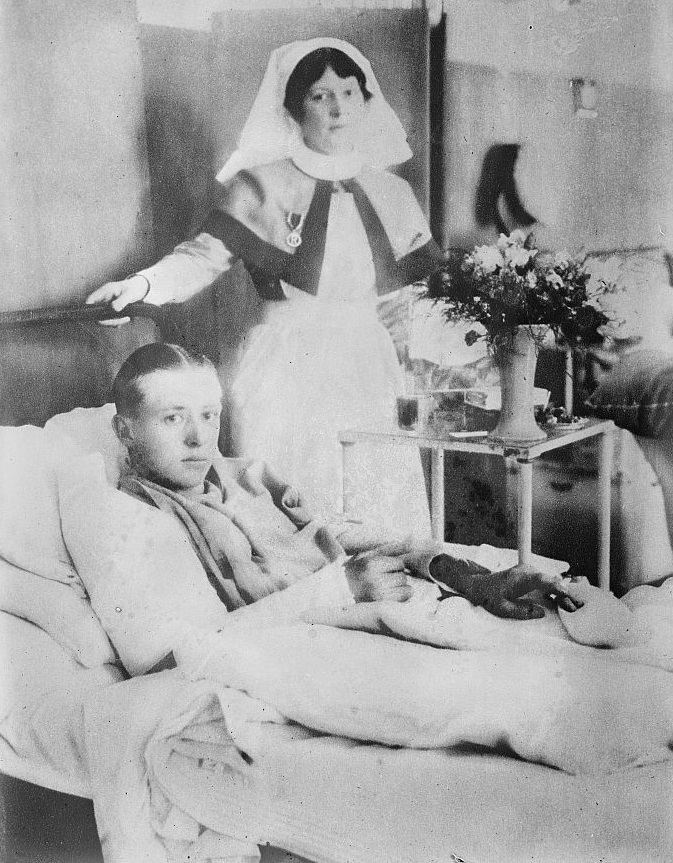
George McCubbin recovering in hospital. 1916

During the First World War McCubbin joined British forces fighting in the East African campaign. He joined the Royal Flying Corps (RFC) as a mechanic before joining their pilot training, despite having not set foot in an aircraft before 1915. On 28 February 1916 he was appointed a probationary second lieutenant. McCubbin received his aviator's certificate in March, at the age of 18, and was appointed a flying officer on 16 May.

McCubbin was commended for his actions in two aerial dogfights and received the Distinguished Service Order (DSO) on 27 July 1916 for his role in these. On the first occasion he witnessed a British aircraft in combat with two German Fokker aircraft. McCubbin entered the action and his observer-gunner shot down an enemy plane.

On the second occasion, McCubbin's aircraft shot down the famed German ace Max Immelmann. At around 9pm on 18 June, Immelmann, in company with two other German aircraft, had engaged part of McCubbin's No. 25 Squadron and shot down one British aircraft, his 17th victory. McCubbin, returning from a bombing raid in a Royal Aircraft Factory F.E.2, spotted the engagement and recrossed into German-held territory to join the fight. Immelmann attempted to close with McCubbin's aircraft using an Immelmann turn while McCubbin dived on the German from higher altitude. The two aircraft passed very close to one another and McCubbin's plane was shot numerous times. McCubbin was badly wounded in the arm (the bullet entering his shoulder and travelling down his forearm) but his gunner-observer, Corporal James Henry Waller, opened fire at close range. Immelmann's aircraft then went into a steep dive from around 2,000 metres (6,600 ft) altitude, during which it broke up, and crashed into the ground.

Despite his wound, McCubbin was able to land safely behind British lines. In addition to McCubbin's DSO, Waller was rewarded with the Distinguished Conduct Medal and promotion to sergeant. The Germans regarded it as embarrassing that Immelmann was shot down by a British aircraft and so stated that he had been killed by friendly anti-aircraft fire. It is also sometimes stated that he was downed by a failure of his aircraft's synchronisation gear, causing his machinegun to shoot off the tips of his own propeller. Such an incident had actually occurred during a dogfight on 31 May 1916, after which Immelmann had successfully carried out an emergency glide landing. A number of British pilots claimed the victory, but RFC commanding officer Hugh Trenchard reviewed the eyewitness testimony and told Director of Air Organisation Sefton Brancker that he thought the victory belonged to McCubbin and Waller, and an order was issued to that effect.

McCubbin recovered afterwards in hospital and was wounded a second time before he received his DSO. In initial reports, McCubbin's name was censored by the British Government, and he and Waller were referred to as "Lieutenant McC." and "Corporal W.". This was in line with an early war convention that RFC officers would not be mentioned by name in news reports. McCubbin's name was revealed in the House of Commons using parliamentary privilege by Sir Arthur Markham, 1st Baronet on 11 July 1916.

On 1 September 1917, McCubbin was promoted to lieutenant. He was promoted to the temporary rank of captain and appointed a 3rd class staff officer on 11 April 1918. McCubbin was transferred to the unemployed list on 10 October 1919.

== Later life and first-class cricket ==
After the war McCubbin returned to the Union of South Africa. He made two appearances in first-class cricket for Transvaal against Rhodesia in March 1923, with the matches played at Salisbury and Bulawayo. In the second match at Bulawayo he met with some success, scoring 97 runs batting at number 10 in a 221-run stand for the ninth wicket with Neville Lindsay, which at the time was a record in first-class cricket in South Africa. The ninth-wicket stand record was not broken until at least 1999.

By 1935 McCubbin was living in Cape Town. He joined the South African Air Force during the Second World War, but was forced to retire owing to poor health. He died in Johannesburg on 9 May 1944.
