= Pfalz Dr.I =

Military plane

Pfalz Dr. I
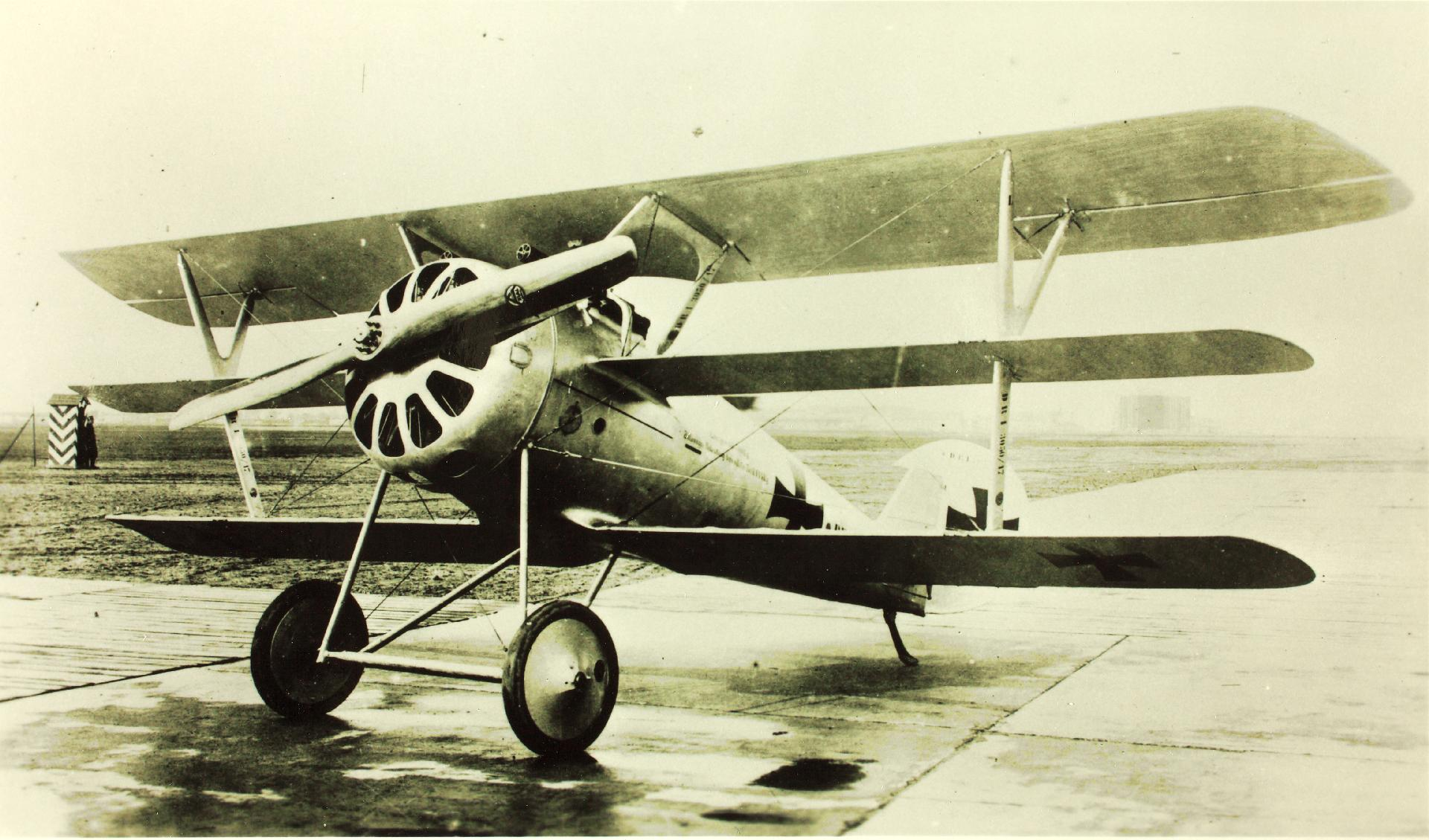
- Pfalz Dr.I

General information
- Type: Fighter
- Manufacturer: Pfalz Flugzeugwerke
- Primary user: Luftstreitkräfte
- Number built: 10

History
- Introduction date: April 1918
- First flight: October 1917
- Retired: 1918

The Pfalz Dr.I was a German fighter prototype of World War I. Official interest in the potential of the triplane configuration for single-seat fighters prompted Pfalz to develop the Dr.I. It underwent initial testing in October 1917, and an initial batch of 10 aircraft were shipped to the Front and arrived in April 1918.

== Operational history ==
Service pilots involved in testing the Dr.I considered it too slow and its Sh III engine too unreliable for frontline use and no further examples were produced. Jasta 73 was equipped with this aircraft in 1918.

== List of operators ==
German Empire

- Luftstreitkrafte

== Specifications ==
Data from Rand McNally Encyclopedia of Military Aircraft, 1914-1980, German Aircraft of the First World War

General characteristics

- Crew: 1
- Length: 5.5 m (18 ft 1 in)
- Wingspan: 8.55 m (28 ft 1 in)
- Height: 2.76 m (9 ft 1 in)
- Wing area: 17.2 m^{2} (185 sq ft)
- Empty weight: 510 kg (1,124 lb)
- Gross weight: 705 kg (1,554 lb)
- Powerplant: 1 × Siemens-Halske Sh.III 11-cylinder air-cooled rotary piston engine, 119 kW (160 hp)
- Propellers: 2-bladed fixed-pitch propeller

Performance

- Maximum speed: 190 km/h (120 mph, 100 kn) at 4,000 m (13,000 ft)
- Service ceiling: 6,000 m (20,000 ft)
- Time to altitude: 1,000 m (3,300 ft) in 1 minutes 42 seconds

3,000 m (9,800 ft) in 6 minutes 12 seconds
5,000 m (16,000 ft) in 13 minutes 30 seconds

Armament

- Guns: 2 x synchronised LMG 08/15 machine guns
