= Jagdstaffel 68 =

Jasta 68
- Active: 1918
- Country: Kingdom of Prussia, German Empire
- Branch: Luftstreitkräfte
- Type: Fighter squadron
- Engagements: World War I

Royal Prussian Jagdstaffel 68, commonly abbreviated to Jasta 68, was a "hunting group" (i.e., fighter squadron) of the Luftstreitkräfte, the air arm of the Imperial German Army during World War I. The squadron would score over 40 aerial victories during the war, including ten observation balloons downed. The unit's victories came at the expense of nine killed in action, and two wounded in action.

== History ==
On 1 February 1918, Jasta 68 was founded at Fliegerersatz-Abteilung ("Replacement Detachment") 3, Gotha, Germany. Nine days later, the new squadron went operational when it was posted to 18th Armee. CO Fritz Pütter scored the first aerial victory on 18 March 1918. Ten days later, Jasta 68 joined Jagdgruppe Nord. The Jasta was transferred to 1 Armee on 5 July 1918. On 13 September 1918, Jasta 68 was posted to 5 Armee. The squadron would serve until its disbandment on 6 December 1918.

== Commanding officers (Staffelführer) ==
- Fritz Pütter: 1 February 1918 – 22 June 1918
- Paul Schwirzke: 22 June 1918 – 14 July 1918
- Fritz Pütter: 14 July 1918 – 16 July 1918 (KIA)
- Paul Schwirzke: 16 July 1918 – 9 August 1918
- Rudolf Otto: 9 August 1918

== Duty stations ==
- Delinghe Ferme: 19 February 1918
- Beauvais: France: 25 March 1918
- Balatre, France: 28 March 1918
- St-Remy-West: 5 July 1918
- Semide, France: 13 September 1918
- Prentin: 15 September 1918

== Notable personnel ==
- Fritz Pütter
- Wilhelm Seitz
- Wilhelm Stör
