= Richard Wenzl =

German World War I flying ace

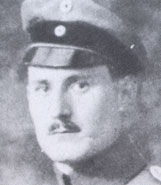
- Died: 13 February 1957
- Military career
- Allegiance: Germany
- Branch: Aviation
- Rank: Leutnant
- Nickname: Ricardo
- Units: Jasta 31, Jasta 11, Jasta 6
- Commands: Jasta 6
- Awards: Royal House Order of Hohenzollern, Iron Cross First Class

Leutnant Richard Wenzl was a German World War I flying ace credited with twelve aerial victories.

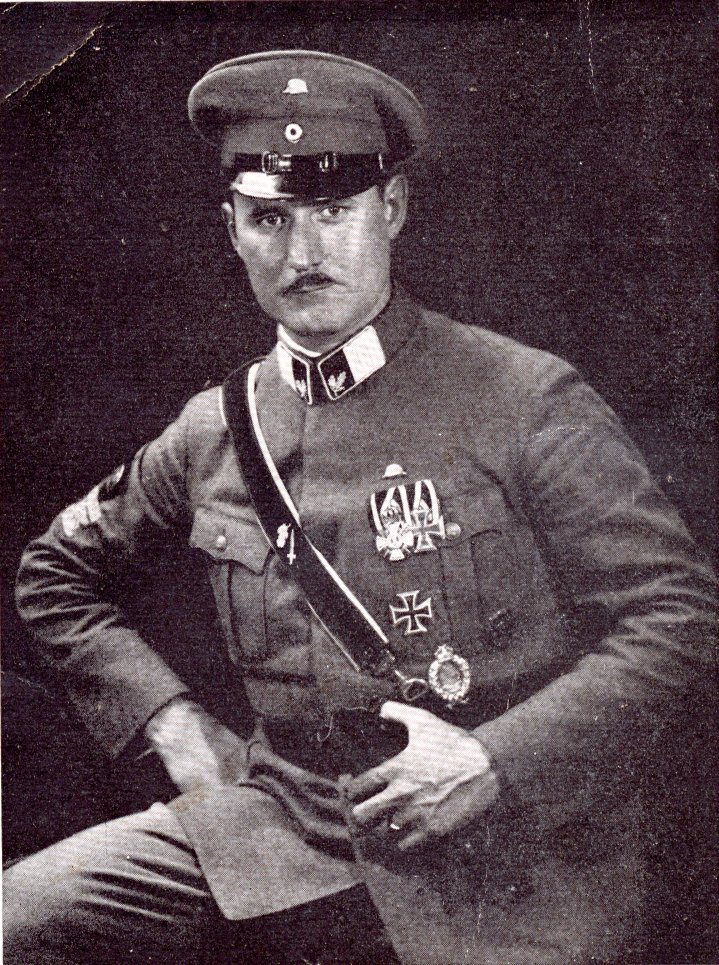

== World War I service ==
Wenzl flew first for an artillery cooperation unit, FAA 236. He transferred, first to KEK Ost, then to Jagdstaffel 31 in the spring of 1917. For his first victory, he shot down and destroyed a Spad on 19 April 1917. He had an unconfirmed claim the following month. He would not score again for a year, after he had switched into Jagdstaffel 11 on 27 March 1918. After his second victory, on 16 May, he transferred to Jagdstaffel 6 the next day. He began a five-month scoring streak on 5 June, running his total to 11 destroyed enemy aircraft and an observation balloon on 5 November 1918. Wenzl also served as the squadron's acting commander from 10 August to 9 September 1918.

In the early Autumn of 1918, Wenzl met Ernst Jünger while in an infirmary in Hanover. Jünger described Wenzl as "one of the tall and fearless types our nation still produces. He lived up to the motto of his squadron, 'Hard - and crazy with it!' and had already brought down a dozen opponents in single combat, although the last had splintered his upper arm with a bullet first."

== Victory list ==
Confirmed victories are numbered; unconfirmed claims are denoted as U/C.

No.	Date/time	Unit	Foe	Location	Notes
1	19 April 1917	Jasta 31	SPAD	South of Moronvillers	
U/C	26 May 1917	Jasta 31	Caudron	Malmy	Caudron forced to land
2	16 May 1918 @ 1930 hours	Jasta 11	Royal Aircraft Factory SE.5a	South of Bois de Vaire	Victim from No. 56 Squadron RAF
3	5 June 1918 @ 1735 hours	Jasta 6	Breguet 14	Soissons	
4	22 July 1918 @ 1620 hours	Jasta 6	SPAD		
5	1 August 1918 @ 0915 hours	Jasta 6	Nieuport 28	Fere-en-Tardenois	Victim from 27th Aero Squadron
6	8 August 1918 @ 1940 hours	Jasta 6	Airco DH.9	Genermont	
7	4 September 1918 @ 1100 hours	Jasta 6	Sopwith Camel	South of Raillencourt-Sainte-Olle	Victim from No. 3 Squadron RAF
8	5 September 1918 @ 1525 hours	Jasta 6	Observation balloon	Croisselles	Balloon serial number 45-12-13
9	29 October 1918 @ 1100 hours	Jasta 6	SPAD	Sommerance	
10	3 November 1918 @ 1455 hours	Jasta 6	SPAD S.XII	Montfaucon	
11	3 November 1918 @ 1455 hours	Jasta 6	SPAD S.XII	Montfaucon	
12	5 November 1918 @ 1010 hours	Jasta 6	Airco DH.4 (s/n 32910)	Stenay, Malmy	Victim from 20th Aero Squadron. 1st Lt. S. P. Mandell and 2nd Lt. R. B. Fulton
