= Friedrich Marnet =

- Born: 22 January 1882; Metz, Lorraine, Germany
- Died: 3 October 1915 (aged 33); Ochsenfurt, Germany
- Military career
- Allegiance: German Empire
- Branch: Luftstreitkräfte
- Service years: 1902–1915
- Rank: Hauptmann
- Unit: Feldflieger Abteilung 6b

Friedrich Marnet (22 January 1882 – 3 October 1915) was a German World War I officer and pilot. He also was one of the first German pilots to fly a Gotha G.

== Background ==
Friedrich Marnet was born into a military family in Metz, one of the strongest fortress of the German Empire. After leaving school, Marnet enlisted into the Prussian Army as a Fahnenjunker (cadet officer) in 1902. He received his commission as Leutnant on 9 March 1903. On 7 March 1912, Marnet was promoted to the grade of Oberleutnant. His flight training took place from July to August 1913. Marnet passed his final pilot's exam in August 1914.

== Involvement in 1st World War ==
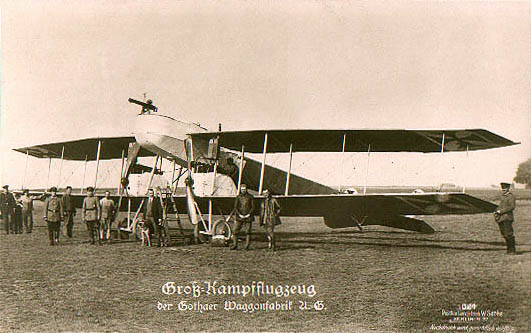
The Gotha G.I, a heavy bomber used by the Luftstreitkräfte

When World War I began in 1914, Marnet was immediately sent to the 1st Ersatz Bataillon 8, as a Platoon leader. At his own instigation, Marnet transferred to Feldflieger Abteilung 1b in May 1915. In June 1915, he participated in a flight observation training course in Schleißheim. On 16 July 1915, Friedrich Marnet transferred to Feldflieger-Abteilung 8b. Soon after, on 9 August 1915, Marnet was promoted Hauptmann. On 21 August 1915, Marnet transferred to Feldflieger Abteilung 6b, then based near Bühl.

In October 1915, while Hauptmann Marnet was flying toward Strasbourg, with a mechanic and an observer, his plane, a Gotha G.I B.14/15, crashed in a freshly tilled field, near Ochsenfurt. Hauptmann Friedrich Marnet's body was recovered from the wreckage, and he was buried with full military honors by his fellows in arms. His grave is now in Munich Waldfriedhof.

== Dates of ranks ==
- Leutnant (Patent No.62): 9. March 1903
- Oberleutnant (Patent No.76): 7 March 1912
- Hauptmann : 9 August 1915

== Sources ==
- "Marnet, Friedrich" on frontflieger.de
