= Zeppelin LZ 16 =

LZ 16 / Z IV
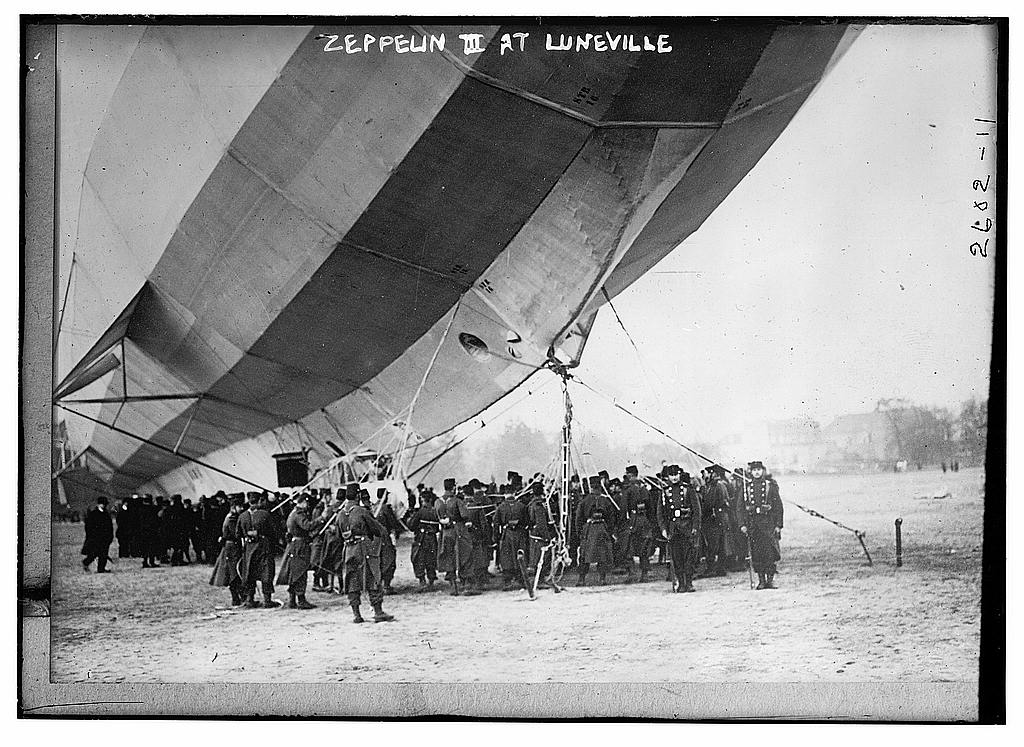
- The LZ 16 in Lunéville, 1913

General information
- Type: Reconnaissance/Bomber airship
- Manufacturer: German Empire Luftschiffbau Zeppelin
- Primary user: German Empire German Army

History
- First flight: March 14, 1913
- Retired: November 17, 1917

The LZ 16, also known as Z IV by the German Army, was a rigid airship built by Luftschiffbau Zeppelin in Friedrichshafen, Germany in the 1910s for military purposes.

== Design and development ==
LZ 16 made its maiden flight on March 14, 1913. On April 3, it departed Friedrichshafen carrying a military acceptance commission en route to Baden-Oos. However, thick fog and strong easterly winds pushed it off course and over France, where it made an unplanned landing at the military parade ground in Lunéville.

The airship and its German officers were briefly detained under false pretenses, and the dirigible was initially impounded. However, on April 4 at 11:45 am, the Zeppelin was released and returned to German territory, landing in Metz at 4:00 pm.

General Auguste Hirschauer, inspector of the French military aviation, declared that the German crew had behaved correctly and that the incident was caused solely by weather. No unauthorized observation or maneuvers had occurred. Footage of the landing was shown in Paris cinemas, drawing large crowds.

The incident also allowed the French to examine technical details of the Zeppelin, as photographs taken and published by the Parisian daily Excelsior revealed construction elements previously known only to experts.

== Operational history ==
When World War I began in August 1914, Z IV was stationed in Königsberg and performed reconnaissance missions on the Eastern Front against Russian forces. It was armed with machine guns and carried small bombs dropped manually.

On the night of September 24–25, 1914, it bombed Warsaw and sustained heavy damage from ground fire, but managed to escape by ascending to 2,800 meters. In a later raid on Lyck (modern-day Ełk), then under Russian occupation, Z IV was struck by around 300 bullets but returned safely to its base at Diwitten, near Allenstein.

Due to aging of its structural framework, Z IV was withdrawn from frontline service in February 1915 and reassigned as a training airship.

During the funeral of German air ace Max Immelmann on June 26, 1916, Z IV flew over the crematorium in Dresden-Tolkewitz, dropping two bouquets of roses from its gondolas. Its final flight took place on October 20, 1916. After completing 419 flights, the airship was dismantled.

== Operators ==
- German Empire German Army

== Bibliography ==
- Brooks, Peter W. (1992). Zeppelin Rigid Airship 1893–1940. Washington D.C.: Smithsonian Institution Press. ISBN 1-56098-228-4.
- Meyer, Peter (1980). Luftschiffe – Die Geschichte der deutschen Zeppeline (in German). Koblenz: Wehr & Wissen.
- Robinson, Douglas H. (1980). The Zeppelin in Combat: A History of the German Naval Airship Division 1912–1918. Washington D.C.: University of Washington Press. ISBN 0-295-95752-2.
- Wissering, Harry (1922). Zeppelin: The Story of a Great Achievement. Chicago: Wells and Co.
