= Jagdstaffel 31 =

Jasta 31
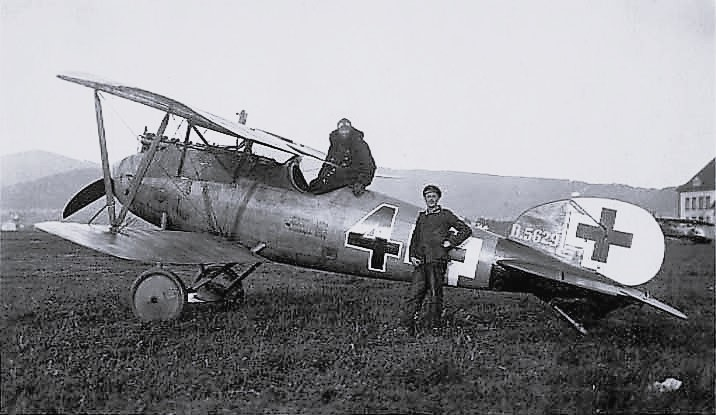
- Albatros of Jasta 31
- Active: 1916–1918
- Country: German Empire
- Branch: Luftstreitkräfte
- Type: Fighter squadron
- Engagements: World War I

Royal Prussian Jagdstaffel 31 was a World War I "hunting group" (i.e., fighter squadron) of the Luftstreitkräfte, the air arm of the Imperial German Army during World War I. As one of the original German fighter squadrons, the unit would score 35 verified aerial victories, including five wins over enemy observation balloons.

In turn, their casualties for the war would amount to nine pilots killed in action, two dead in aircraft accidents, six wounded in action, and two injured in accidents.

== History/Operations ==
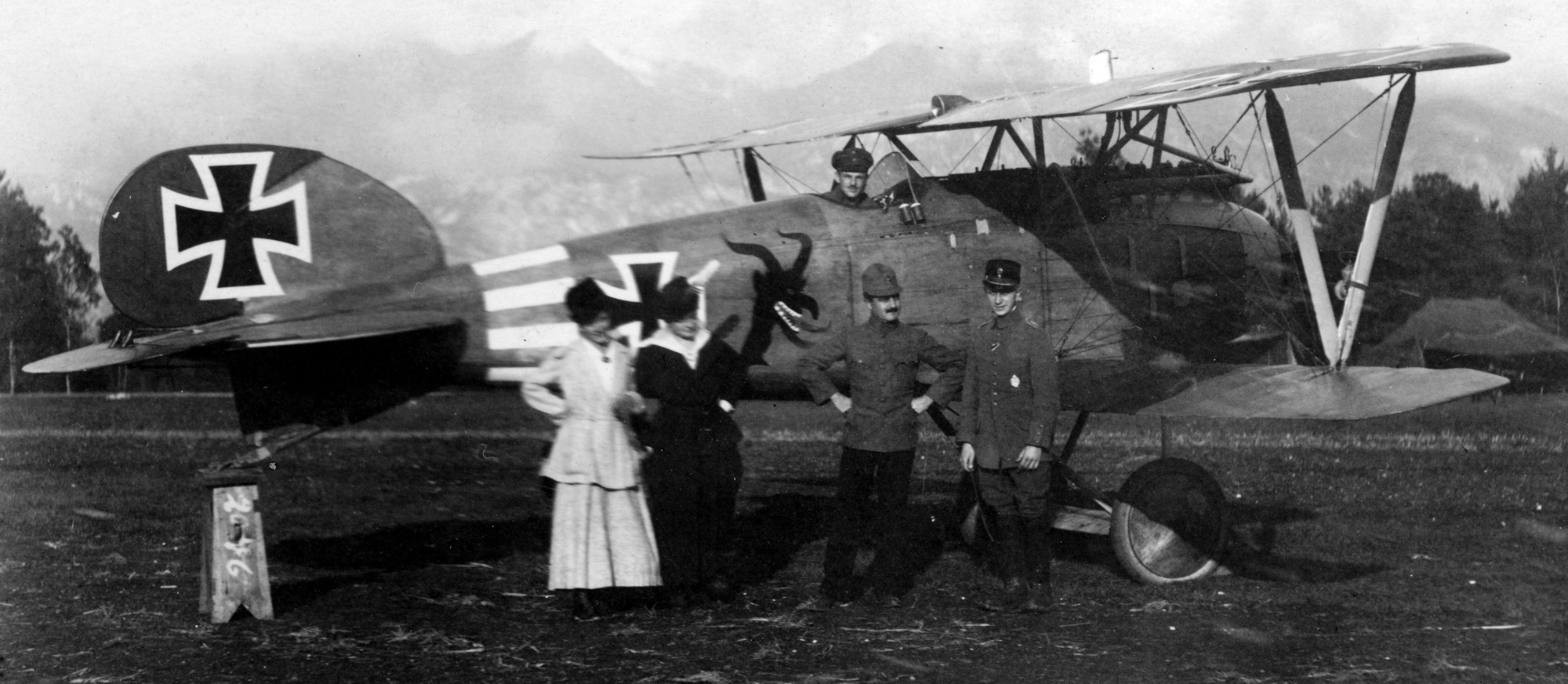
A Jasta 31 Albatros D.III on display to visitors.

Royal Prussian Jagdstaffel 31 was formed on 14 December 1916 at Breslau, the site of the FEA II training unit in the 3rd Armee Sector. It was mobilized into action on 7 February 1917. Its first victory was scored on 3 March 1917 by Staffelführer Albert. On 11 September 1917, it left the Western Front for service in Italy. Between 25 October 1917 and 20 February 1918, it racked up 14 victories in Italy. It was then shifted back to the Western Front on 7 March, and there completed its war. It returned from there toward the end of February 1918, and returned to the Western Front. It fought through to war's end, and was disbanded along with the rest of the Luftstreitkräfte.

== Commanding officers (Staffelführer) ==
1. Leutnant Werner Albert: Unknown date – 10 May 1917 (KIA)
2. Oberleutnant Gunther Viehweger: transferred in from Jasta 17 on 10 May 1917 – transferred out on 6 September 1917
3. Leutnant Zech: transferred in from Jasta 1 on 6 September 1917 – promoted out of unit on 18 May 1918
4. Oberleutnant Robert Blumenbach: transferred in from Jasta 12 on 18 May 1918 – 2 October 1918
5. Hauptmann Eduard Seldner: transferred in from Jasta 37 on 2 October 1918 – 17 March 1919?

== Aerodromes ==
1. Mars-sous-Bourcq, France: 8 February 1917 – Unknown date
2. Italy: 11 September 1917 – Late February or early March 1918
3. Western Front: 7 March 1918 – ca 11 November 1918

== Notable members ==
One member of Jasta 31 was a recipient of the Royal House Order of Hohenzollern and Iron Cross:

- Richard Wenzl

Two members were Iron Cross winners:

- Sylvester Garsztka
- Fritz Jacobsen

Two other aces served with the squadron:

- Alwin Thurm
- Kurt Jacob

== Aircraft ==
Jasta 31 used the Albatros D.III, D.III (OAW), Albatros D.V and Roland D.II fighters.
