= Wilhelm Stör =

German flying ace during World War I

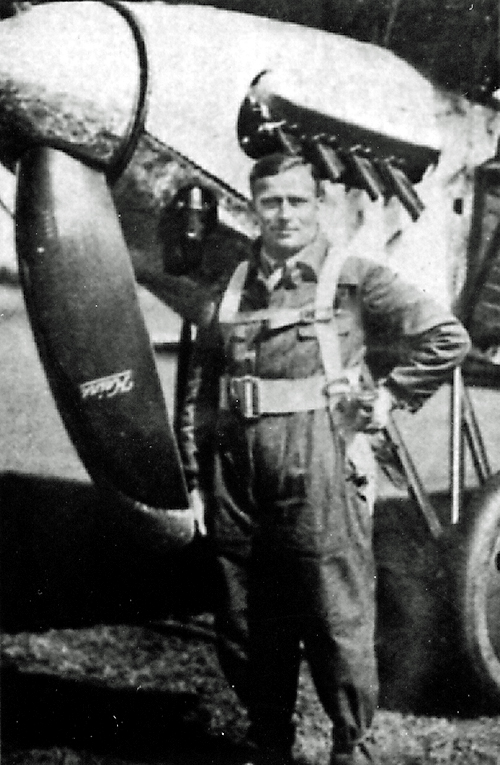
- Born: 10 May 1893; Witten, Kingdom of Prussia
- Died: 12 December 1977 (aged 84); Augsburg, Germany
- Military career
- Allegiance: Germany
- Branch: Luftstreitkräfte
- Rank: Vizefeldwebel
- Nickname: Willi
- Unit: Jagdstaffel 68
- Awards: Iron Cross

Vizefeldwebel Wilhelm "Willi" Stör (10 May 1893 – 12 December 1977) was a World War I flying ace credited with five aerial victories. After the war, he was appointed the chief test pilot for Messerschmitt at the Augsburg factory.

== Biography ==
Wilhelm Stör was born on 5 October 1893 in Witten, Germany.

After serving in a Hussar Regiment of the Imperial German Army in World War I he transferred to the Luftstreitkrafte (Imperial German Flying Corps), where he became a fighter pilot with Jagdstaffel 68 and was credited with shooting down three aircraft and two observation balloons. He was awarded the Iron Cross for his actions.

In the interwar period he became a stunt pilot and aerobatic instructor. He was then a pilot at the Deutsche Verkehrsfliegerschule (DVS—German Air Transport School) and won the German master aerobatic contest in 1935 and 1936 flying a BFW M.35 monoplane (serial D-EQAN) with a distinctive 'sun-burst' livery which he also demonstrated in other countries. He was then appointed the chief test pilot for Messerschmitt at their factory in Augsburg and was notable for tutoring Rudolf Hess to fly Messerschmitt aircraft including the Bf 108 and the Bf 110 (radio code VJ+OQ) that he flew to Scotland in 1941. Stör was directed to deliver two Bf 109 fighters to Kawasaki, Japan, in May 1941 and his colleague Helmut Kaden then took over as the flying instructor to Hess.
