= Wilhelm Seitz =

German World War I flying ace

- Born: Unknown
- Died: 1926
- Military career
- Allegiance: Germany
- Branch: Aviation
- Rank: Leutnant
- Unit: Jagdstaffel 8
- Commands: Jagdstaffel 68
- Awards: Military Karl-Friedrich Merit Medal, Iron Cross First and Second Class

Leutnant Wilhelm Anton Seitz was a German World War I flying ace credited with 16 aerial victories. He scored those victories over a two-year span, beginning on 17 November 1916 and ending on 4 November 1918.

== Aerial service ==
Seitz was already a Vizefeldwebel when he joined Jagdstaffel 8 on 10 November 1916. He scored his first aerial victory on 17 November. He would account for three more opponents during 1917, and had run his total to ten by the time he transferred out of the squadron. In September 1918, he was appointed to command Jagdstaffel 68. As Vizefeldwebel is not a command rank, it can be inferred that Seitz had previously been commissioned as Leutnant. Leading his new unit by example, Seitz shot down six more enemy airplanes by the Armistice. He ended the war credited with 16 aerial victories. He had been awarded both classes of the Iron Cross, as well as the Military Karl-Friedrich Merit Medal.
