= Fritz Anders (aviator) =

Fritz Gerhard Anders
- Born: 23 August 1889; Cottbus, The German Empire
- Died: 8 November 1919 (aged 30)
- Military career
- Allegiance: German Empire
- Branch: Luftstreitkräfte
- Rank: Leutnant (Second Lieutenant)
- Units: Schutzstaffel 8, Jagdstaffel 35, Jagdstaffel 4
- Commands: Jagdstaffel 73
- Conflicts: World War I
- Awards: Iron Cross (both classes)

Leutnant Fritz Gerhard Anders was a World War I flying ace credited with seven aerial victories. He was the world's first night fighter ace.

== Early life ==
Fritz Gerhard Anders was born in Cottbus on 23 August 1889. He was a prewar pilot, gaining pilot's license 592 on 12 November 1912.

== World War I service ==
Anders began his aerial service for the First World War as a pilot in Schutzstaffel (Protection Squadron) 8. He would serve with this early fighter-bomber unit until he was transferred to a fighter squadron, Jagdstaffel 34 in March 1917. On 14 April 1917, he was wounded in action; he returned to duty ten days later. On 2 June 1917, he transferred to Jagdstaffel 4. He scored his initial aerial victory on 7 July 1917, when he downed a Sopwith Pup from Nine Naval Squadron of the Royal Naval Air Service.

On 20 February 1918, Anders was appointed as Staffelführer to command Jagdstaffel 73. He scored his second victory on 14 June 1918, downing a SPAD, possibly flying a Fokker Triplane. Then, flying with his squadron's pioneering nightfighting detail, Anders ran off a string of five aerial victories at night between 20 August and 25 September 1918 to become history's first nightfighter ace. On 13 October 1918, Anders was transferred to Jastaschule II, a school for fighter pilots.

During the war, Anders earned both classes of the Iron Cross.

== Post World War I ==
Fritz Gerhard Anders died on 8 November 1919.
