= Feldflieger Abteilung =

Feldflieger Abteilung (FFA, Field Flying Detachment) was the title of the pioneering field aviation units of Die Fliegertruppen des deutschen Kaiserreiches (The Air Forces of the German Empire) formed in 1912, which became the Luftstreitkräfte (German air service) on 8 October 1916, during the First World War.

== Die Fliegertruppen ==
The Fliegertruppen des deutschen Kaiserreiches, the aerial service of the Deutsches Heer, the Army of the German Empire, was formed in 1912 when its organisation was laid down. Five new Flieger Bataillone (Aviation Battalions) with four companies each began forming in 1913. Four of the new units were created as part of the Communications Branch of the Prussian Army and one by the Bavarian Army; Saxony formed a detachment that was attached to a Prussian unit. The Bataillone were administrative units to provide flights for each army and corps HQ. At first aircraft were transported with armies, being assembled when they were needed but after one aircraft came apart in the air, killing the crew, the practise was abolished. The rest of the aircraft were modified to make them less likely to kill their crews. When 1914 began there was a shortage of aircraft and pilots. By the summer the shortage had been alleviated by new pilots trained by flying schools. The use of its aircraft for tactical reconnaissance was established by the German Army in its annual exercise in June 1911. Early use was limited to providing post-flight situation reports.

=== Flieger Bataillone: 1914 ===
Prussian and Bavarian Flieger Bataillone (Aviation Battalions), July 1914
Army	Stations	Attached to
Prussian Flieger Bataillon Nr 1	Döberitz: HQ and 1 Kompanie, Jüterbog: 2 Kompanie, Großenhain: 3 (Saxon) Kompanie	Gardekorps
Prussian Flieger Bataillon Nr 2	Posen: HQ and 1 Kompanie, Graudenz: 2 Kompanie, Königsberg: 3 Kompanie	V Korps
Prussian Flieger Bataillon Nr 3	Köln: HQ and 1 Kompanie, Hannover: 2 Kompanie, Truppenübungsplatz (Proving ground), Darmstadt: 3 Kompanie	VIII Korps
Prussian Flieger Bataillon Nr 4	Straßburg: HQ and 1 Kompanie, Metz: 2 Kompanie, Freiburg: 3 Kompanie	XV Korps
Bavarian Luft-und-Kraftfahrer Bataillon	Bavarian Aviation and Motor Battalion München	I Bavarian Korps
Bavarian Flieger Bataillon	Oberschleißheim	I Bavarian Korps

== First World War ==
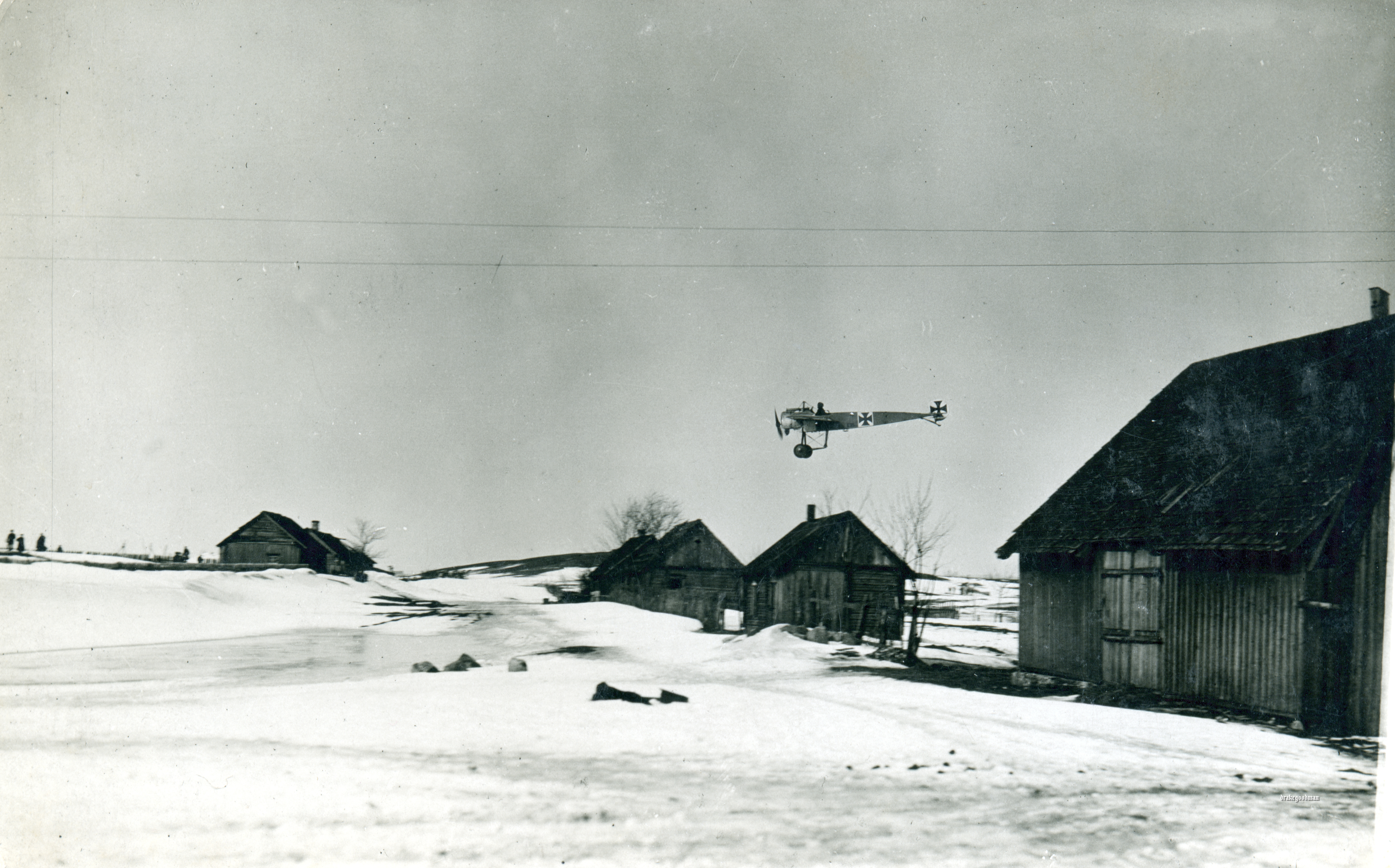
A Fokker E.II 35/15 from Feldflieger Abteilung 14, on the Eastern Front, preparing to land.

At the start of the First World War, there were thirty-three FFA (three Bavarian), one allocated to each of the eight Army Headquarters and one to each of the twenty-five regular Corps Headquarters and six Festungflieger Abteilungen (Fortress Flying Detachments, one Bavarian) for the local defence of towns. Each FFA, having a number usually matching that of the army group it was assigned to, was equipped with either six Idflieg Category A (unarmed monoplane) or Category B (unarmed biplane) two-seater aircraft for short-range reconnaissance, photographic reconnaissance and artillery-observation. Longer-range flights were left to Zeppelins. By March 1915 the number of Feldflieger Abteilungen had doubled and the specialisation of fighter and bomber units, known as Jasta and Kampfgeschwader, respectively, had emerged but not forming formally under such names until the reorganisation of Die Fliegertruppen and its renaming as the Luftstreitkräfte on 8 October 1916.

=== FFA ===
Unit	Location	Attachment	Notable Personnel
6b	Bühl (Saarburg)	Bavarian	Kurt Wintgens, Friedrich Marnet
9b		Bavarian	
10	Vrizy		Max Immelmann
23	Roupy		Hans Joachim Buddecke, Ernst Freiherr von Althaus, Rudolf Berthold
48	Mülhausen		Kurt Wintgens
62	La Brayelle (Douai)		Oswald Boelcke, Max Immelmann, Otto Parschau
