= Max Ritter von Mulzer =

German flying ace

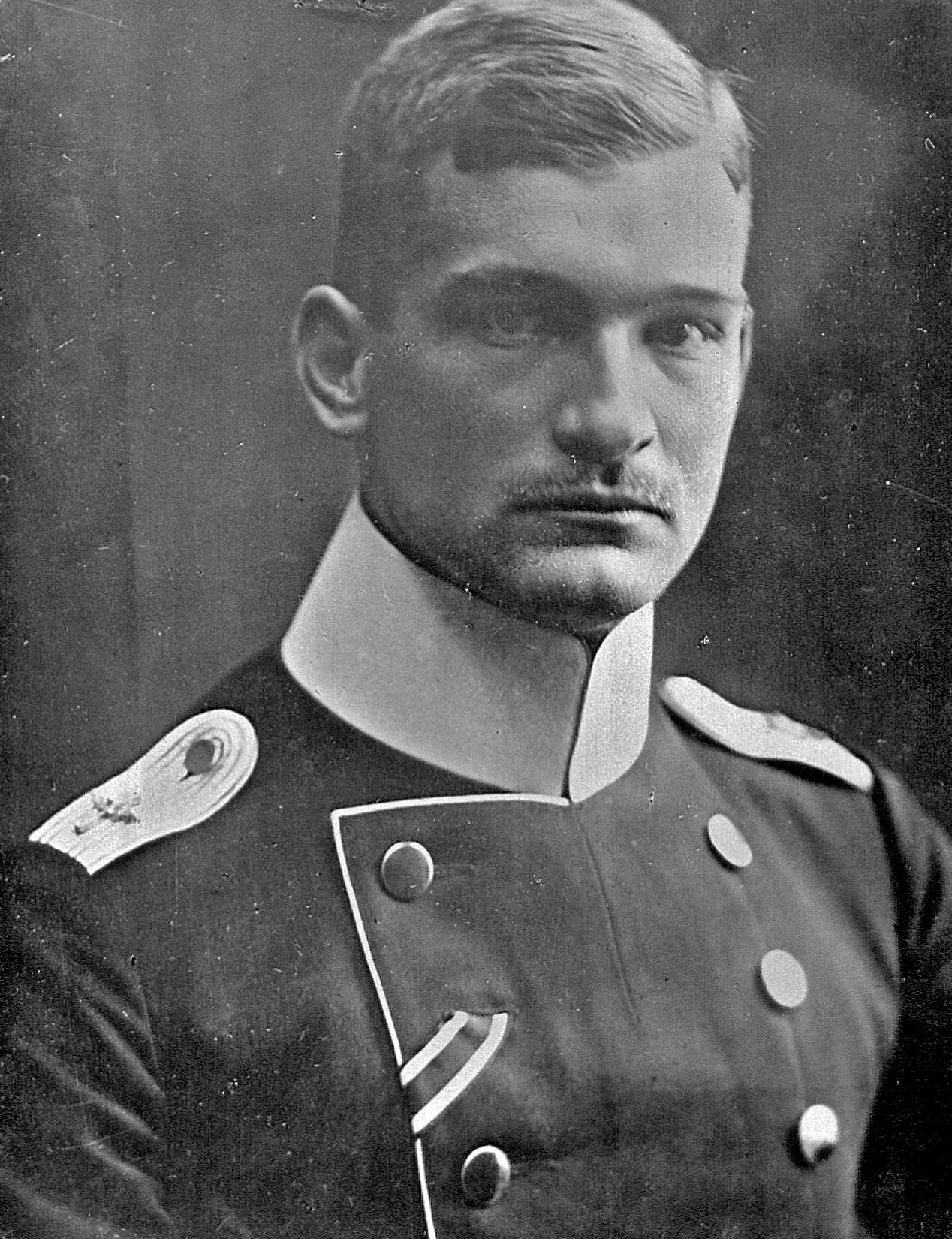
- Born: 9 July 1893; Kimratshofen, Allgäu, Kingdom of Bavaria
- Died: 26 September 1916 (aged 23); Valenciennes, France
- Military career
- Allegiance: Germany
- Branch: Cavalry; aviation
- Service years: 1914–1916
- Rank: Leutnant
- Units: 8th Cavalry Regiment; Feldflieger Abteilung 4 (FFA 4); Flieger-Abteilung 62 (FA 62}; Kampfeinsitzerkommando Nord (KEK Nord); Kampfeinsitzerkommando "B" (KEK B); Flieger-Abteilung 32 (FA 32)
- Awards: Pour le Merite; Military Order of Max Joseph; Iron Cross

Leutnant Max Ritter von Mulzer was a German World War I flying ace credited with ten aerial victories. He was the first Bavarian fighter ace, first Bavarian ace recipient of the Pour le Merite, and first Bavarian knighted for his exploits.

== Biography ==
=== Early life ===
Max Mulzer was born on 9 July 1893 in the Kingdom of Bavaria in the German Empire.

=== Military service ===
Mulzer graduated from cadet training with the Royal Bavarian Cadet Corps on 10 July 1914, and was commissioned in the 8th Cavalry Regiment on 13 December 1914. He transferred to aviation on 20 August 1915. He was posted to FA 4 on 13 December, but soon joined Oswald Boelcke and Max Immelmann in FFA 62. Indeed, Mulzer and Immelmann often flew together, and were referred to, respectively, as "Bavarian Max" and "Saxon Max" to differentiate them. "Bavarian Max"'s first victory, on 13 March 1916, went unconfirmed, but he had three confirmed victories between 30 March and 31 May. When FA 62 shipped out for service in Russia, Mulzer transferred to KEK Nord in June 1916 and tallied three more wins during the month, with the second one occurring during the dogfight during which his friend Immelmann was killed.

Mulzer had the honor of carrying Immelmann's decorations on the black velvet Ordenkissen cushion in the funeral procession. Afterwards, he then had a fleeting assignment to FFA 32, and went on to KEK 'B'. He scored twice for them, on 8 and 22 July; the eight victories were enough at that time to earn him the Blue Max. He also received the Military Order of Max Joseph and thus earned a lifetime pension and became a non-hereditary knight entitled to be addressed by the honorific "Ritter von". He moved on to FA 32, and scored twice more.

On 26 September, the day after Kurt Wintgens died, Mulzer had a new airplane to test fly. Apparently prompted by news of his old comrade's death, Mulzer remarked, "Immelmann is dead. Parschau is dead, Wintgens is dead. Now I am next in line." Then he took off from the Valenciennes airfield on a test flight, side-slipped his Albatros D.I into a hard bank, lost control, and crashed to his death.
