= Jagdstaffel 73 =

Jasta 73
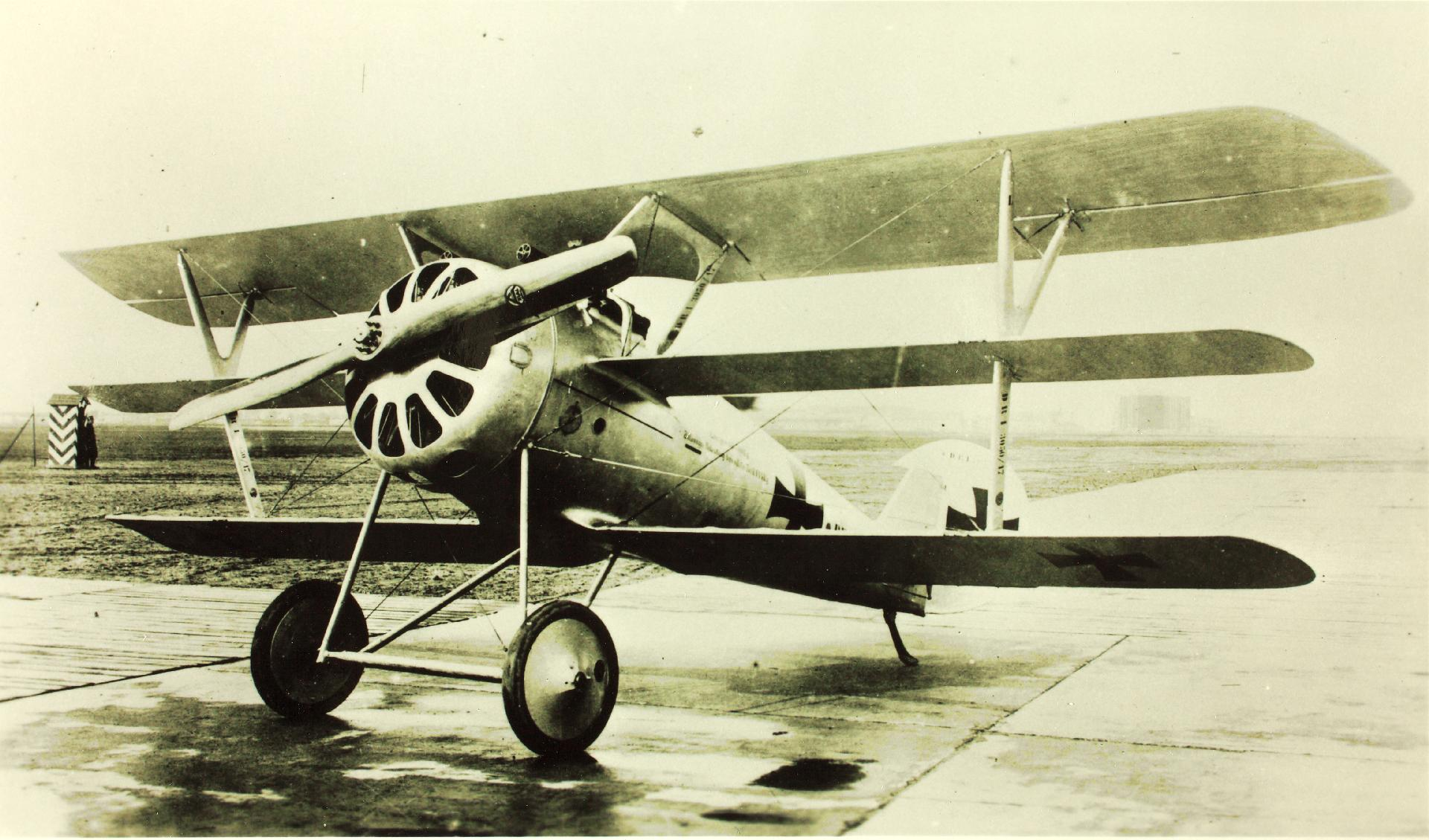
- Active: 1918
- Country: Kingdom of Prussia, German Empire
- Branch: Luftstreitkräfte
- Type: Fighter squadron
- Engagements: World War I

Royal Prussian Jagdstaffel 73, commonly abbreviated to Jasta 73, was a "hunting group" (i.e., fighter squadron) of the Luftstreitkräfte, the air arm of the Imperial German Army during World War I. squadron would score 29 aerial victories during the war, including seven night victories, and including an observation balloon downed. The unit's victories came at the expense of three killed in action.

== History ==
Jasta 73 was founded on 11 February 1918 at Fliegerersatz-Abteilung ("Replacement Detachment") 14, Halle, Saxony-Anhalt, Germany. The new squadron was first assigned to 3 Armee. The new unit flew its first combat sorties on 17 March 1918. On 21 May 1918, the Jasta moved to 1 Armee. It scored its first aerial victory while there, on 30 May 1918. On 11 July 1918, it was incorporated into Jagdgruppe 1. Jasta 73 is arguably the world's first night fighter squadron; its Staffelführer Fritz Anders was the first night fighter ace in history.

== Commanding officers (Staffelführer) ==
- Fritz Anders: ca 11 February 1918 – 13 October 1918
- Wilhelm Schwartz: 13 October 1918 – war's end

== Duty stations ==
- Leffincourt, France
- Mars-sous-Bourcq, France: 9 March 1918
- Saint-Remy-le-Petit, France: 21 May 1918
- Saint-Loup-en-Champagne, France: 14 September 1918

== Notable personnel ==
- Fritz Anders
- Fritz Jacobsen

== Aircraft ==
- Equipped with rare Pfalz Dr.Is at one point.
