= Sainte-Marie-à-Py =

- Commune
- Location of Sainte-Marie-à-Py
- Location within France Location within Grand Est
- Coordinates: 49°14′23″N 4°30′10″E
- Country: France
- Region: Grand Est
- Department: Marne
- Arrondissement: Châlons-en-Champagne
- Canton: Argonne Suippe et Vesle

Government
  - Mayor (2020–2026): Brigitte Chocardelle
- Area^{1}: 26.92 km^{2} (10.39 sq mi)
- Elevation: 131 m (430 ft)
- Population (2023): 194
  - Density: 7.21/km^{2} (18.7/sq mi)
- Time zone: UTC+01:00 (CET)
  - Summer (DST): UTC+02:00 (CEST)
- INSEE/Postal code: 51501 /51600
- ^{1} French Land Register data, which excludes lakes, ponds, glaciers > 1 km^{2} (0.386 sq mi or 247 acres) and river estuaries.

Sainte-Marie-à-Py (French pronunciation: [sɛ̃t maʁi a pi]) is a commune in the Marne department in north-eastern France.

== See also ==
- Communes of the Marne department
