= Kurt Wintgens =

German fighter pilot in World War I

- Born: 1 August 1894; Neustadt in Oberschlesien, German Empire
- Died: 25 September 1916 (aged 22) near Villers-Carbonnel, France
- Military career
- Allegiance: German Empire
- Branch: Signal Corps, Aviation, Luftstreitkräfte
- Service years: 1913–1916
- Rank: Leutnant
- Awards: Iron Cross, Pour le Mérite

Leutnant Kurt Wintgens (1 August 1894 – 25 September 1916) was a German World War I fighter ace. He was the first fighter pilot to score an aerial victory with a synchronized machine gun. Wintgens was the recipient of the Iron Cross and the Pour le Mérite (Blue Max).

== Background ==
Wintgens was born into a military family in Neustadt in Oberschlesien. His military service commenced when he joined the Telegraphen-Bataillon Nr. 2 in Frankfurt/Oder as a Fahnenjunker (cadet officer) in 1913.

== Involvement in First World War ==
Though still in military school when the war began in 1914, Wintgens was sent to the Eastern Front as a leutnant and won the Iron Cross, 2nd Class. On transferring to the German Air Service, Wintgens flew first as an observer, apparently alternating with telegraph duty. However, in early 1915 he entered pilot training at the Fokker school in Schwerin, where Leutnant Otto Parschau had already been brought in by the Fokker factory to prepare an example of an armed (with a Parabellum MG14 synchronized gun) version of the Fokker A.III single-seat monoplane, with IdFlieg military serial number A.16/15 (the very same "green machine" aircraft that Parschau had flown since the summer of 1914) for front-line trials. Wintgens specifically requested the chance "to fly in the field the smallest and fastest Fokker type with the Garros-installation, which enabled a built-in machine gun to fire through the (arc of the rotating) propeller." With that background he was selected, along with Leutnant Parschau, as one of the first Fokker Eindecker pilots, flying single-seaters that had been assigned to fly alone with various two-seater-equipped field flying detachments, starting with the Bavarian Feldflieger Abteilung 6b, then based near Saarburg.

In the early summer of 1915, the initial deployments of Fokker Eindecker fighter planes began. These were carried out only with single aircraft, with each one attached to established Feldflieger Abteilung two-seat observation aircraft units, each unit normally equipped with six two-seaters apiece.

=== First victory using a synchronized gun ===
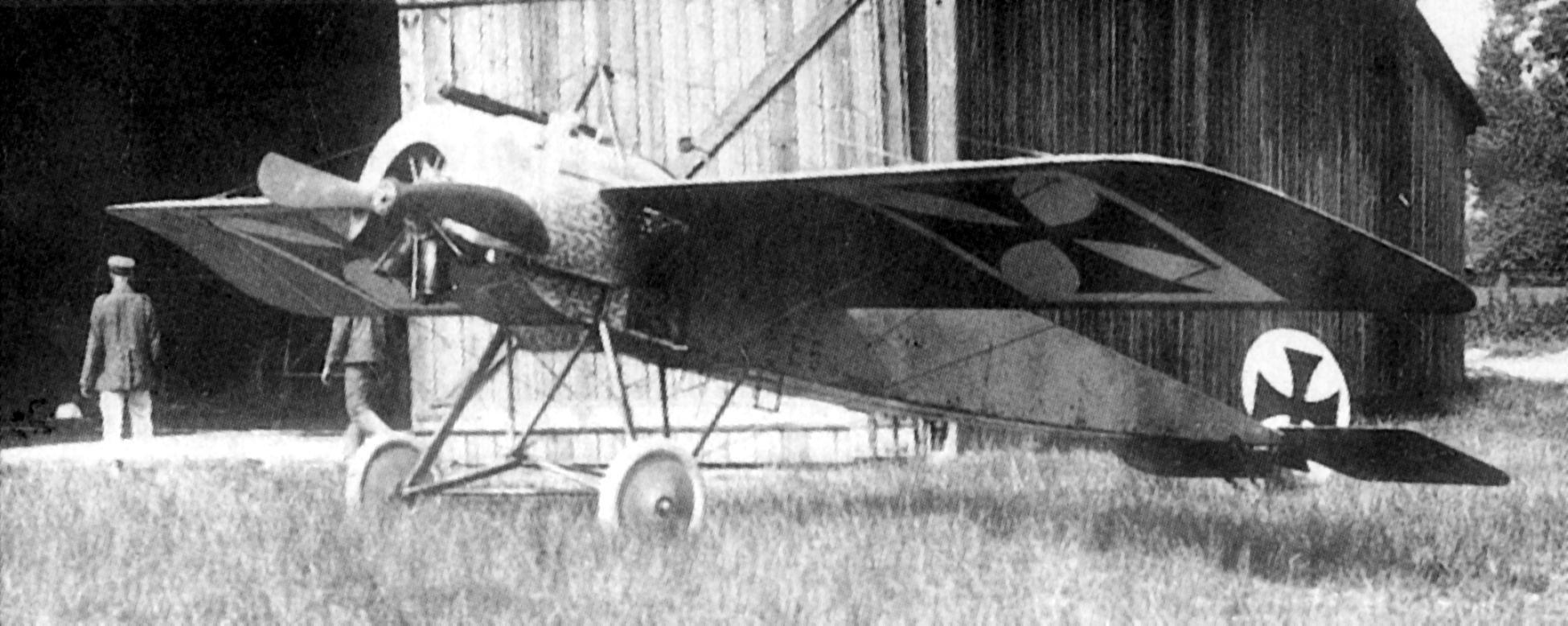
The actual aircraft used by Wintgens in his pioneering aerial engagement, his Fokker M.5K/MG with IdFlieg military serial number "E.5/15", as it appeared at the time of the engagement.

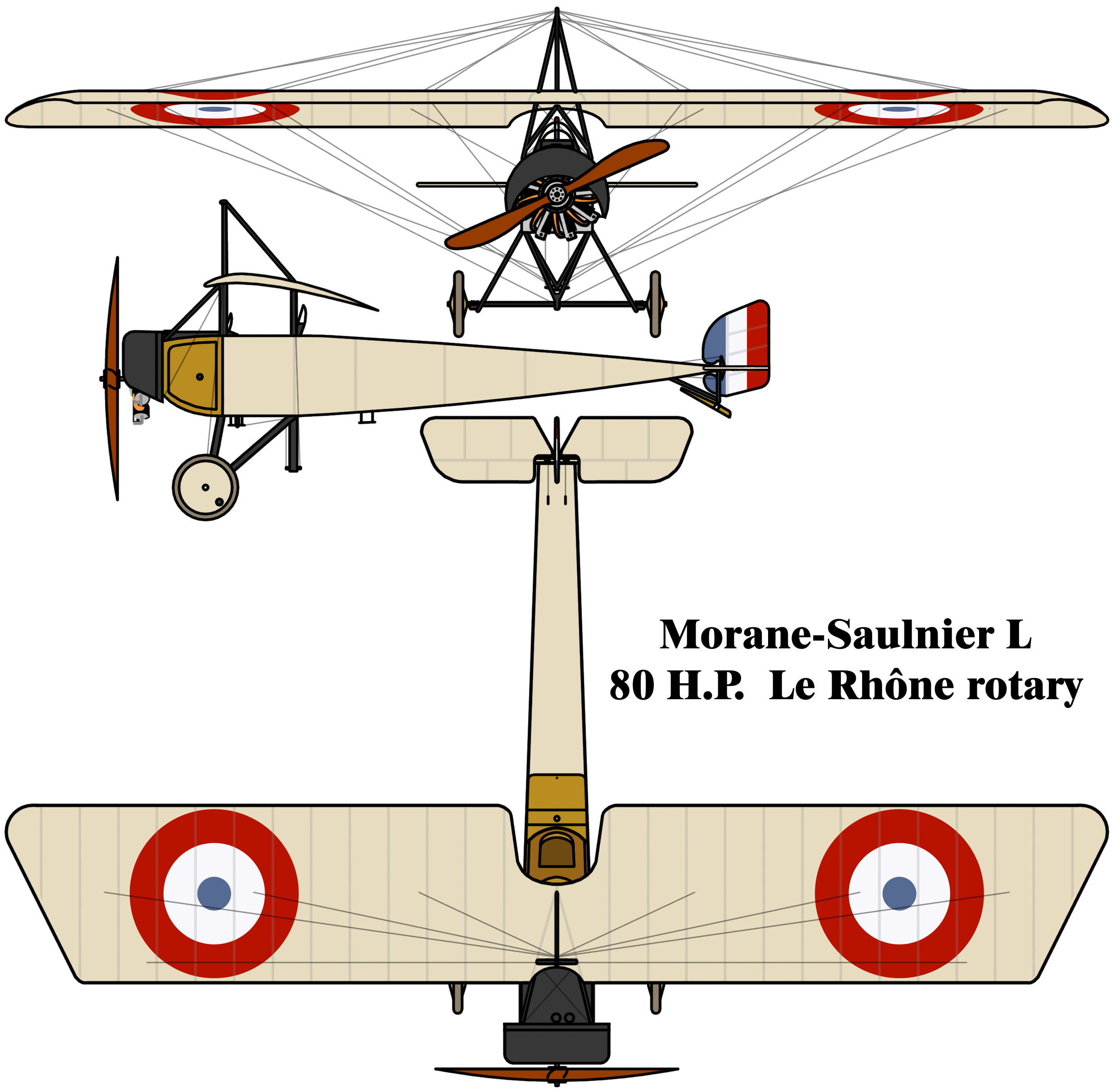
The first trio of Wintgens' "victories" from July 1–15, 1915, were over Morane Parasol aircraft.

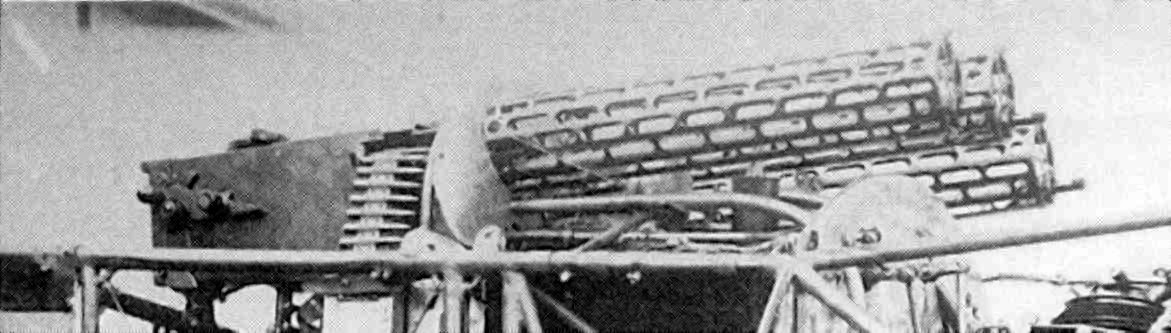
Spandau Machine guns reportedly on Wintgens' later Fokker E.IV aircraft

Wintgens holds a unique pioneering role in the history of aerial combat, being the first fighter pilot to down an enemy aircraft using a synchronized gun. On 1 July 1915, Leutnant Wintgens was flying the last-produced example of the five Fokker M.5K/MG production prototype Eindecker aircraft, with German military serial number E.5/15, and at 18:00 that evening he engaged a Morane-Saulnier Type L "Parasol" two-seater. The French aircraft was most likely from Escadrille M.S.48, and flown by Capitaine Paul du Peuty, with Sous-Lieutenant de Boutiny as the observer. The French aviators reported that they were engaged by a "Fokker Monoplane" at 1,300 meters over the Fôret de Parroy, near the village of Lunéville. The French aircraft was armed with only a carbine, while the Fokker had a forward-firing, synchronized Parabellum MG 14 machine gun. After a few minutes of combat with the Fokker, de Peuty was wounded in the lower right leg. The Eindecker seemed to have been hit by de Boutiny's carbine fire. De Boutiny had exhausted all of his carbine ammunition, leaving his own aircraft defenseless, which gave the Eindecker the advantage, and shortly thereafter the Eindecker likewise wounded de Boutiny in the leg. Despite their injuries, the French aircrew landed their Morane Parasol safely, in friendly territory, although their own engine had been hit by dozens of shots from E.5/15's machine gun fire, with the combat taking place in the Lorraine sector.

Leutnant Wintgens wrote a letter to a friend named "Karl" the next day with the details of the engagement:

Bühl-Saarburg

2 July 1915

Dear Karl:

Unfortunately I gave you the wrong address last time, for during my voyage to Mühlhausen I got a different destination and for the time being I am with the Bavarian (unit) Abteilung 6b. Up to now nothing of real interest happened. In Mannheim I had tested the machine and then from Strasbourg by air to the Front, where lately a (Morane) Parasol fighter monoplane à la Garros had made its presence felt.
I had flown to the Front a couple of times without seeing an opponent, until yesterday evening when the big moment came. Time: 6:00 o'clock. Place: east of Lunéville. Altitude: between 2,000 and 2,500 m. Suddenly I notice a monoplane in front of me, about 300 m higher. And at the same moment he had already dived in front of me, fiercely firing his machine gun decently. But as I, at once, dived in an opposite direction under him, he missed wildly. After four attacks I reached his altitude in a large turn, and now my machine gun did some talking. I attacked at such a close distance that we looked each other into the face.
After my third attack he did the most stupid thing that he could do – he fled. I turned the crate on the spot and had him at once, beautifully, in my (gun)sight. Rapid fire for about four seconds, and down went his nose. I could follow him until 500 meters, then, unfortunately, I was fired upon from the ground too hotly; the fight (now) being far over the French lines. Hopefully, I'll soon meet a biplane.
Cordial greetings and so long,
Your friend,

— Kurt"., Sands, Jeffrey, "The Forgotten Ace, Ltn. Kurt Wintgens and his War Letters", Cross & Cockade US, Summer 1985.

However, because the Morane landed in Allied territory, Wintgens was not credited with an official victory. Wintgens would down another "Parasol" in similar circumstances three days later, again unconfirmed.

=== Subsequent actions ===
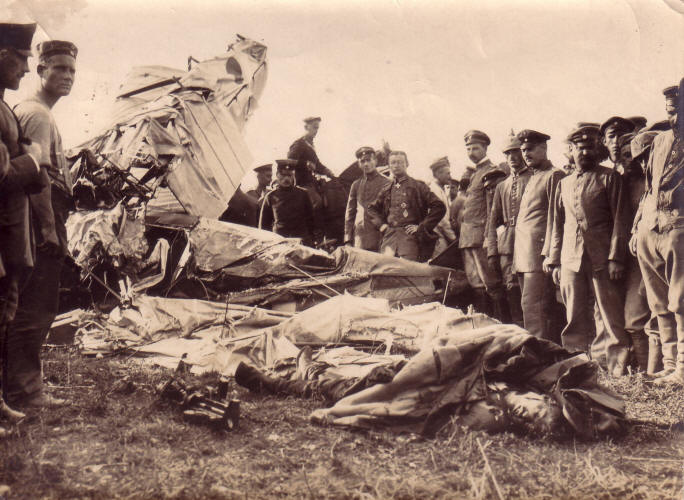
Wintgens and one of his air victories

A fortnight after his initial success, Wintgens was posted to Feld Flieger Abteilung 48, based at Mulhouse, within the much-disputed Alsace border region of northeast France, that had been annexed by the Reich in 1871. On 15 July, Wintgens scored his first "recognized" aerial victory, still flying his E.5/15 Eindecker, and once again downing a Morane Parasol for this victory – the very first "official" victory by an Eindecker pilot, and the first confirmed victory using a synchronized machine gun. Wintgens' victory was the very first for his unit, and earned him an Iron Cross First Class.

He followed up with two more confirmed victories in 1915, as well as an unconfirmed one on 24 January 1916. Wintgens then suffered from a lingering case of influenza that kept him from flying. He would not score again until 20 May 1916, when he shot down a two-seater Nieuport while flying for FFA 6. The following day, the twin engines of the Caudron G.IV he downed augered a meter and a half in the earth after a 4,000 meter crash. None of the crew survived.

On 24 June 1916, Wintgens (possibly flying a Halberstadt D.II) achieved his seventh confirmed victory when he confronted a Nieuport 16, flown by the then-wounded Lafayette Escadrille American pilot Victor Chapman, who had been wounded by fellow Eindecker pilot Walter Höhndorf just a week earlier. Chapman was killed in the crash, the first American fighter aviator flying in World War I to lose his life in an aerial engagement.

Shortly afterwards, on 1 July 1916, Wintgens became the fourth airman to receive the 'Blue Max', after he had completed the required (at the time) eight victories over enemy aircraft. Wintgens continued to score throughout the summer and into the autumn. He continued to use the Fokker E.IV even as his contemporaries upgraded; Hans-Joachim Buddecke's writings mention Wintgens blipping the Fokker's rotary engine on and off as a signal to waiting squadron members that a flight had been victorious. As he entered September, Wintgens remained the third-ranking Eindecker ace, behind Oswald Boelcke and Max Immelmann, with some 14 victories in the Fokker monoplane.

On 25 September, Wintgens flew his E.IV on patrol along with his friend Walter Höhndorf. It is claimed that they went to the assistance of a two-seater flown by Josef Veltjens, which was under attack by French scouts. After downing at least 19 aircraft (with probables and force-downs, as high as 22) in air combat, Wintgens was killed in action near Villers-Carbonnel, probably by French ace Alfred Heurteaux, for Heurteaux's eighth aerial victory. Heurteaux was most likely flying one of the early examples of the SPAD S.VII fighter. Höhndorf rushed back to base to sorrowfully report that Wintgens' plane broke up under the impact of "explosive bullets". Josef Jacobs remarked in his diary that recovery of Wintgens' body from no man's land was difficult. Buddecke blamed the crash on a severed elevator spar, and noted that Wintgens showed no bullet wounds. Two days later, Wintgens was laid to rest in the same French graveyard that already contained the body of his fellow Fokker Eindecker pioneering pilot, Otto Parschau.
