= Hermann Pfeiffer =

German World War I flying ace

- Born: 24 July 1890; Tengen, Grand Duchy of Baden
- Died: 20 May 1917 (aged 26); Lessincourt, France
- Military career
- Allegiance: German Empire
- Branch: Imperial German Air Service
- Rank: Leutnant (Second Lieutenant)
- Units: Feldflieger Abteilung 110; Feldflieger Abteilung 10; Jagdstaffel 9
- Awards: Prussia: Iron Cross First and Second Class; Baden: Silver Military Karl-Friedrich Merit Medal; Baden: Military Karl-Friedrich Merit Order

Leutnant Hermann Pfeiffer (24 July 1890 – 20 May 1917) IC was a German World War I flying ace credited with eleven aerial victories.

== World War I military service ==
Pfeiffer joined the German army on 1 October 1913. He rose to Unteroffizier in the 114th Bavarian Infantry Regiment. He won an Iron Cross Second Class in May 1915. He then transferred to aviation, and in July, he began pilot training. Once qualified, he was posted to Feldflieger Abteilung 110, where he was promoted to Vizefeldwebel on 11 July 1916. Later that month, he transferred to Feldflieger Abteilung 10, to fly single-seated Fokker fighters. He came under the command of Kurt Student. Pfeiffer shot down a Caudron on 6 August 1916. Four days later, he received the Iron Cross First Class as a consequence. On 24 August, 2 and 26 September, he shot down a Caudron apiece. On 7 October, Feldflieger Abteilung 10 morphed into Jagdstaffel 9. Pfeiffer continued to shoot down enemy planes, tallying seven more between 10 November 1916 and 14 May 1917. During this stretch, he also received two decorations from his native Baden, as well as being commissioned on 21 November 1916.

On 20 May 1917, Hermann Pfeiffer died during the test flight of a captured Nieuport fighter.
