= Munish =

Munish may refer to:

- Munish Arora (born 1971), Indian-born Singaporean cricketer
- Munish Jolly (born 1974), Indian former cricketer
- Munish Makhija (born 1968), Indian video jockey
- Munish Chander Puri (1939–2005), former professor emeritus of mathematics at IIT Delhi
