= Jagdstaffel 9 =

Jasta 9
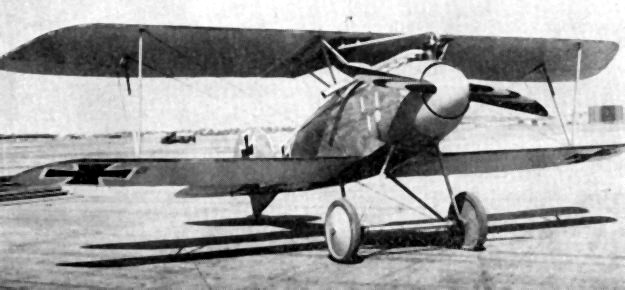
- Albatross D.III
- Active: 1916–1919
- Country: German Empire
- Branch: Luftstreitkräfte
- Type: Fighter squadron
- Engagements: World War I

Royal Prussian Jagdstaffel 9 was a "hunting group" (fighter squadron) of the Luftstreitkräfte, the air arm of the Imperial German Army during World War I. Although the squadron, and the Luftstreitkräfte, were short-lived, they had great influence on the Nazi Luftwaffe, as can be seen by the later careers of the unit's Staffelführer. It was founded on 28 September 1916, and by the time it disbanded on 15 January 1919, it was credited with 107 aerial victories. In turn, it had suffered thirteen pilots killed in combat, three wounded, five non-combat deaths, and three injuries.

== History ==
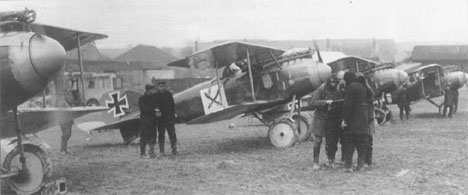
The Jasta 9 flightline in France.

When Jagdstaffel 9 was founded, it absorbed the pre-existing Fokkerstaffel attached to 3 Armee. This ad hoc Fokkerstaffel had been formed under Oberleutnant Ascheberg on 16 June 1916. He relinquished this unit to Oberleutnant Kurt Student on 23 September. The unit was officially founded five days later; it mobilized a week later, and moved to Leffincourt. It remained operational at that field for the next year and a half under Student. The Jasta then underwent the turmoil of shifting airfields eight times during the last eight months of war. When it shifted to Chéry-les-Pouilly, it also shifted to support of the 7 Armee. In July 1918, it joined Jagdgruppe 5 at Maizy; this oversized wing also contained Jasta 1, Jasta 41, Jasta 45, Jasta 50, and Jasta 66.

== Commanding Officers (Staffelführer) ==
1. Oberleutnant Kurt Student: 5 October 1916 – 14 March 1918
2. Leutnant Walter Blume: 14 March 1918 – 11 November 1918

== Duty stations (airfields) ==
1. Leffincourt: 5 October 1916 – 23 March 1918
2. Chéry-lès-Pouilly: 24 March 1918 – 6 June 1918
3. Montceau-le-West: 6 June 1918 – 11 July 1918
4. Fonfry: 11 July 1918 – 20 July 1918
5. Rocourt-Saint-Martin: 20 July 1918 – 23 July 1918
6. Bazoches: 23 July 1918 – 26 July 1918
7. Maizy: 27 July 1918 – 31 July 1918
8. Sissonne: 1 August 1918 – 11 October 1918
9. Plounion: 11 October 1918 – 11 November 1918

== Personnel ==
The squadron's commanders were not the only notable fliers serving in the unit. Other pilots, such as Hartmuth Baldamus, Fritz Pütter, Erich Thomas, Hermann Pfeiffer, and Heinrich Kroll also served with distinction.

== Aircraft and operations ==
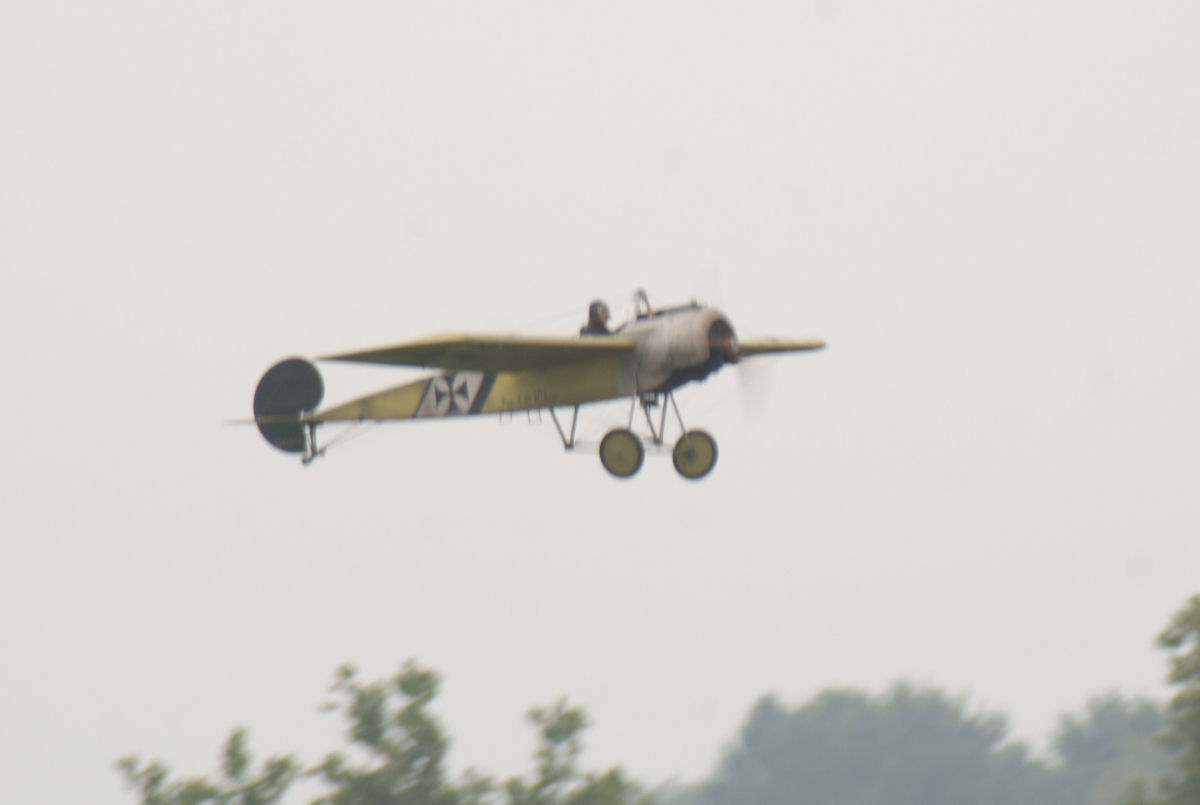
Fokker EIIIs were Jasta 9's original aircraft

The unit was founded using Fokker E.IIIs and Fokker E.IVs that were forwarded from the previous Fokkerstaffel. Albatros D.IIs were assigned in early 1917. The unit later progressed to Fokker D.VIIs in summer 1918, probably in May.
