= Thomas Stephenson =

Thomas or Tom Stephenson may refer to:

- Thomas Stephenson (chemist) (1864-1933), Scottish chemist
- Tom Stephenson (activist) (1893–1987), British journalist and walkers' rights activist
- Thomas Alan Stephenson (1898–1961), British marine biologist
- Thomas Bowman Stephenson (1839–1912), British Methodist minister
- Thomas Frederick Stephenson (1894–1917), World War I flying ace with the Royal Air Force
- Thomas F. Stephenson (born 1942), American businessman and ambassador to Portugal
- Tom Stephenson (rugby union) (born 1994), English rugby union player
- Tom Stephenson (trade unionist) (1895–1962), English trade unionist

== See also ==
- Thomas Stevenson (disambiguation)
