= Hans-Georg von der Marwitz =

German flying ace (1893–1925)

- Born: 7 August 1893; Ohlau, Silesia, German Empire (modern Oława, Poland)
- Died: 12 May 1925 (aged 31)
- Military career
- Allegiance: Germany
- Branch: Cavalry; infantry; aviation
- Rank: Oberleutnant
- Units: Uhlan Regiment No. 16; Infanterie Regiment No. 13; Infanterie Regiment No. 16; Kampfgeschwader 5; Schutzstaffel 10; Jagdstaffel 30
- Awards: Royal House Order of Hohenzollern; Iron Cross

Hans-Georg von der Marwitz (7 August 1893 – 12 May 1925) was a German World War I flying ace credited with 15 aerial victories.

== Early life and ground service ==
Hans-Georg von der Marwitz was born at Ohlau, Silesia on 7 August 1893. He was born to nobility, his father being General of Cavalry Georg von der Marwitz, commander of Germany's Second Army. The younger Marwitz began his career as a cavalryman in Uhlan Regiment No. 16. By 1915, he was in the infantry, successively in Infanterie Regiment No. 13 and Infanterie Regiment No. 16.

== Aviation service ==
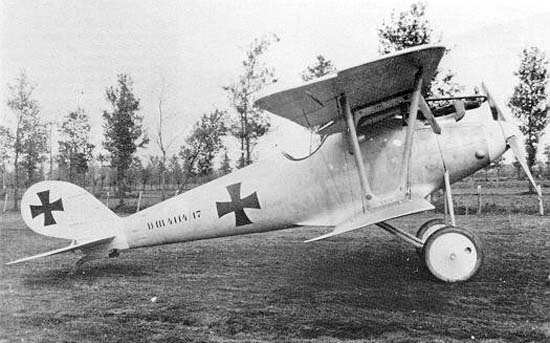
A Pfalz D.III (not yet in squadron livery).

Marwitz transferred to aviation in March 1916 and became a pilot flying a bomber for Kampfgeschwader 5. After a transfer Marwitz scored his first victory while flying for Schutzstaffel 10, on 5 January 1917. A year later, he trained as a fighter pilot; upon completion of training, on 18 April 1917, he was assigned to Royal Prussian Jagdstaffel 30 under the command of Hans Bethge. He scored his second time that year, when he used his Pfalz D.III fighter to burn an observation balloon on 13 May.

Marwitz would not score again until 19 February 1918; he then tallied a victory of two per month for the remainder of the war. Marwitz commanded Jagdstaffel 30 for two months, from 17 April to 17 June 1918 As Staffelfuhrer, he flew a Pfalz painted all burgundy except for a white rudder and a large orange diamond emblazoned on either side of its cockpit. He was wounded on 17 June. He would fly a Pfalz until July 1918, when Jasta 30 upgraded to Fokker D.VIIs.

== Postwar ==
Marwitz survived the war, only to die in an airplane crash.
