= Joachim von Bertrab =

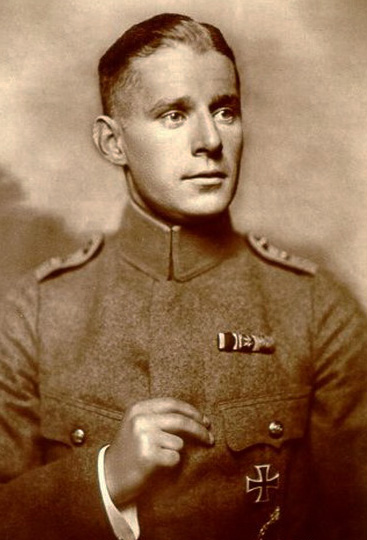
- Born: 18 February 1894; Sankt Andreasberg, Duchy of Brunswick
- Died: 18 July 1922 (aged 28); Boitzenburg, Germany
- Military career
- Allegiance: German Empire
- Branch: Luftstreitkräfte
- Service years: 1914–1917
- Unit: Jagdstaffel 30
- Awards: Iron Cross First Class

Leutnant Joachim Lambert Robert Herman von Bertrab (1894–1922) was a German air ace of the First World War credited with five confirmed victories.

== Early life ==
Joachim von Bertrab was born in the village of Sankt Andreasberg in the Duchy of Brunswick, the German Empire. He began his military service in his duchy's No. 46 Field Artillery Regiment as a leutnant.

== World War I service ==
After switching to aviation duty, Bertrab was initially assigned to Feldfliegerabteilung 71, then Fokkerstaffel Metz. After transfer, while serving with Jagdstaffel 30 under Hans Bethge, Bertrab claimed two Martinsyde G100 bombers from No. 27 Squadron RFC on 6 April 1917. A British formation of four targeted Ath, Belgium. Bertrab picked off one Martinsyde "Elephant" as they began their bomb run, and set afire a second one after bomb fall. Just over two hours later, at 1048 hours, Bertrab's attack on a formation of Sopwith 1 1/2 Strutters from No. 45 Squadron RFC caused two to collide in midair, with no survivors. A Royal Aircraft Factory F.E.2d from No. 20 Squadron RFC was then claimed on 15 May 1917 over Lille.

While attempting to become a balloon buster by shooting down an observation balloon over Souchez, France, for his sixth victory Bertrab was shot down by Lt. Mick Mannock of 40 Squadron on 12 August and taken prisoner. Ironically Bertrab became Mannock's sixth official victory. Mannock noted that it took him five minutes dogfighting to down Bertrab's new black Albatros D.V, and that he wounded the German ace in the left leg and both arms, breaking the right one. He was held in the Raikeswood POW Camp for officers in Skipton, North Yorkshire.

Bertrab favored an Albatros D.III or Albatros D.V as his aircraft of choice. His personal mount was painted black or dark purple, with the Maltese Crosses edged in white and a comet painted on the side of the fuselage. Bertrab won both classes of the Iron Cross for his feats.

== Postwar ==
Joachim von Bertrab survived the war but died near Boitzenburg on 18 July 1922 in a plane crash. His image was placed on Sanke card No. 516.
