= Jagdstaffel 30 =

Jasta 30
- Active: 1916–1918
- Country: German Empire
- Branch: Luftstreitkräfte
- Type: Fighter squadron
- Engagements: World War I

Royal Prussian Jagdstaffel 30, commonly abbreviated to Jasta 30, was a "hunting group" (i.e., fighter squadron) of the Luftstreitkräfte, the air arm of the Imperial German Army during World War I. The unit would score a minimum of 63 aerial victories during the war, at the expense of twelve killed in action, six wounded in action, and two taken prisoner of war.

== History ==
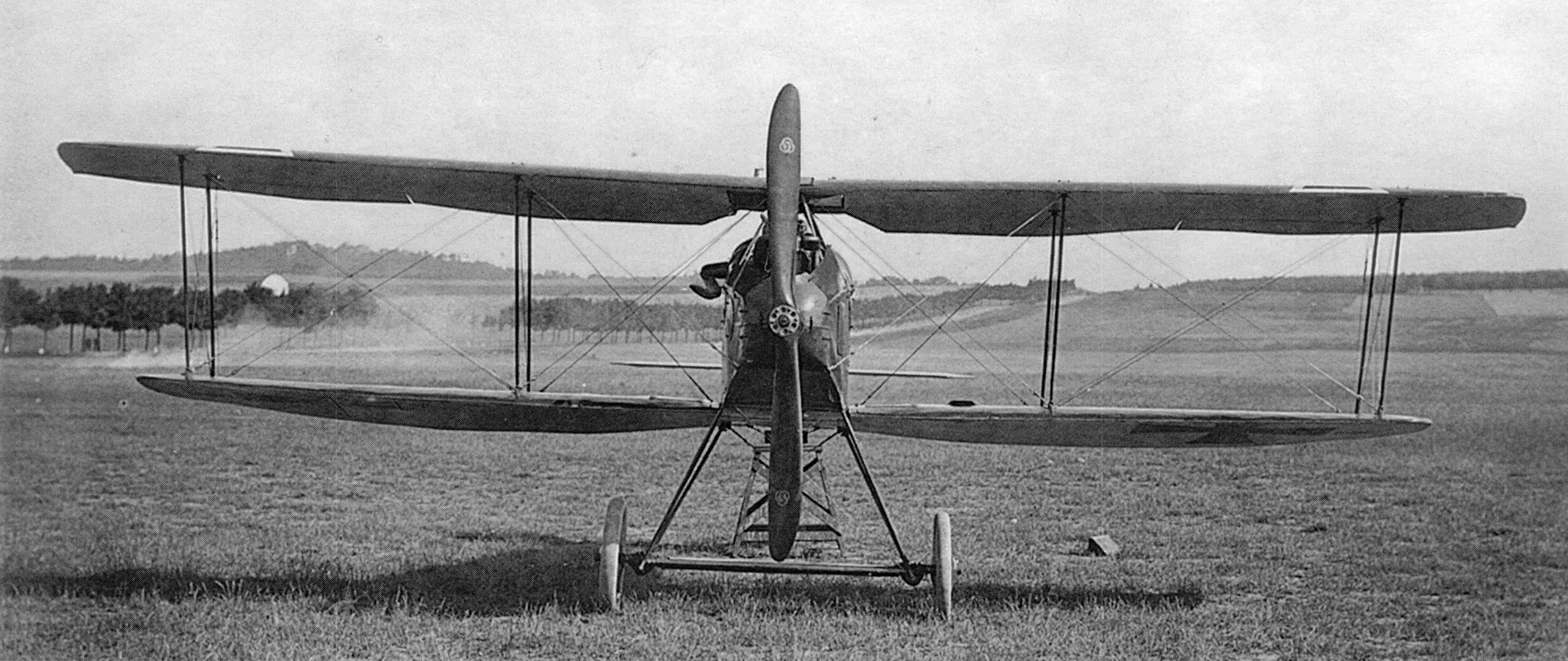
Jasta 30 originally flew Halberstadt D.II fighters like this.

Jagstaffel 30 was formed on 14 December 1916 at Breslau, and mobilized for action on 21 January 1917 at Phalempin. Its first victory came on 1 March, being scored by its new commander, Hans Bethge. It served through the German Empire's defeat and dissolution.

== Commanding officers (Staffelführer) ==
1. Hans Bethge: Transferred in from Jasta 1 on 15 January 1916 – 10 November 1917
2. Kurt Preissler: 10 November 1917 – 10 December 1917
3. Hans Bethge: 10 December 1917 – 15 January 1918
4. Kurt Preissler: 15 January 1918 – 19 January 1918
5. Hans Bethge: 19 January 1918 – 17 March 1918 (KIA)
6. Kurt Preissler: 19 March 1918 – transferred to staff of Jagdgruppe II on 16 April 1918
7. Hans-Georg von der Marwitz: 17 April 1918 – 17 June 1918 (WIA)
8. Hans Eggers: 17 June 1918 – 21 June 1918
9. Richard Flashar: Transferred from Jagdgruppe III on 21 June 1918 – 1 July 1918
10. Kurt Müller: Transferred from Jasta 24 on 1 July 1918 – 25 July 1918
11. Hans-Georg von der Marwitz: 25 July 1918 – 1 August 1918
12. Hans Holthusen: 1 August 1918 – 14 August 1918
13. Hans-Georg von der Marwitz: 15 August 1918 – 11 November 1918

== Aerodromes ==
1. Breslau (now in Poland): 14 December 1916 – 25 January 1917
2. Phalempin, France: 25 January 1917 – 9 August 1918
3. Moislains: 9 August 1918 – 10 August 1918
4. Phalempin: 10 August 1918 – 19 August 1918
5. Avelin: 19 August 1918 – 30 September 1918
6. Baisieux: 30 September 1918 – 15 October 1918
7. Avaing: 15 October 1918 – 11 November 1918

== Notable personnel ==
Hans Bethge and Hans-Georg von der Marwitz scored about half the squadron's aerial victories between them. Both of them were recipients of the Royal House Order of Hohenzollern and the Iron Cross. Joachim von Bertrab, an Iron Cross winner, was noted for having shot down two pairs of enemy aircraft in a single day; one pair consisted of two Martinsyde Elephants. Pour le Mérite winner Hans-Joachim Buddecke also served with Jasta 30.

== Aircraft ==
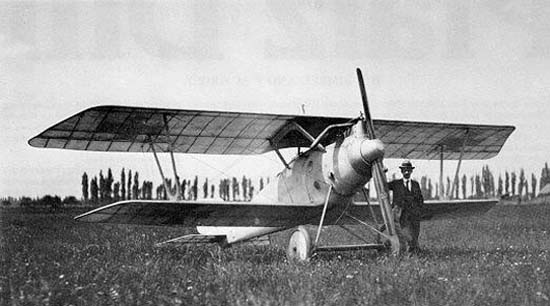
Pfalz D.IIIs would come into service with the Jasta in August 1917.

The Pfalz D.III was introduced into service in August 1917. It was rugged and reliable, though mediocre in performance. It was still being used by Jasta 30 as late as 17 March 1918, when Hans Bethge was killed while flying one. The Halberstadt D.II was brought into service in the summer of 1916, to be followed shortly by the Halberstadt D.III used by Jasta 30. The Halberstadts were usually succeeded by newer Albatros aircraft, with the Halberstadts relegated to use as trainers.

== Operations ==
Jasta 30's only verified operational commitment was to the 6th Armee.
