= Mick Mannock =

British flying ace (1887–1918)

Major Mick Mannock VC, DSO & Two Bars, MC & Bar
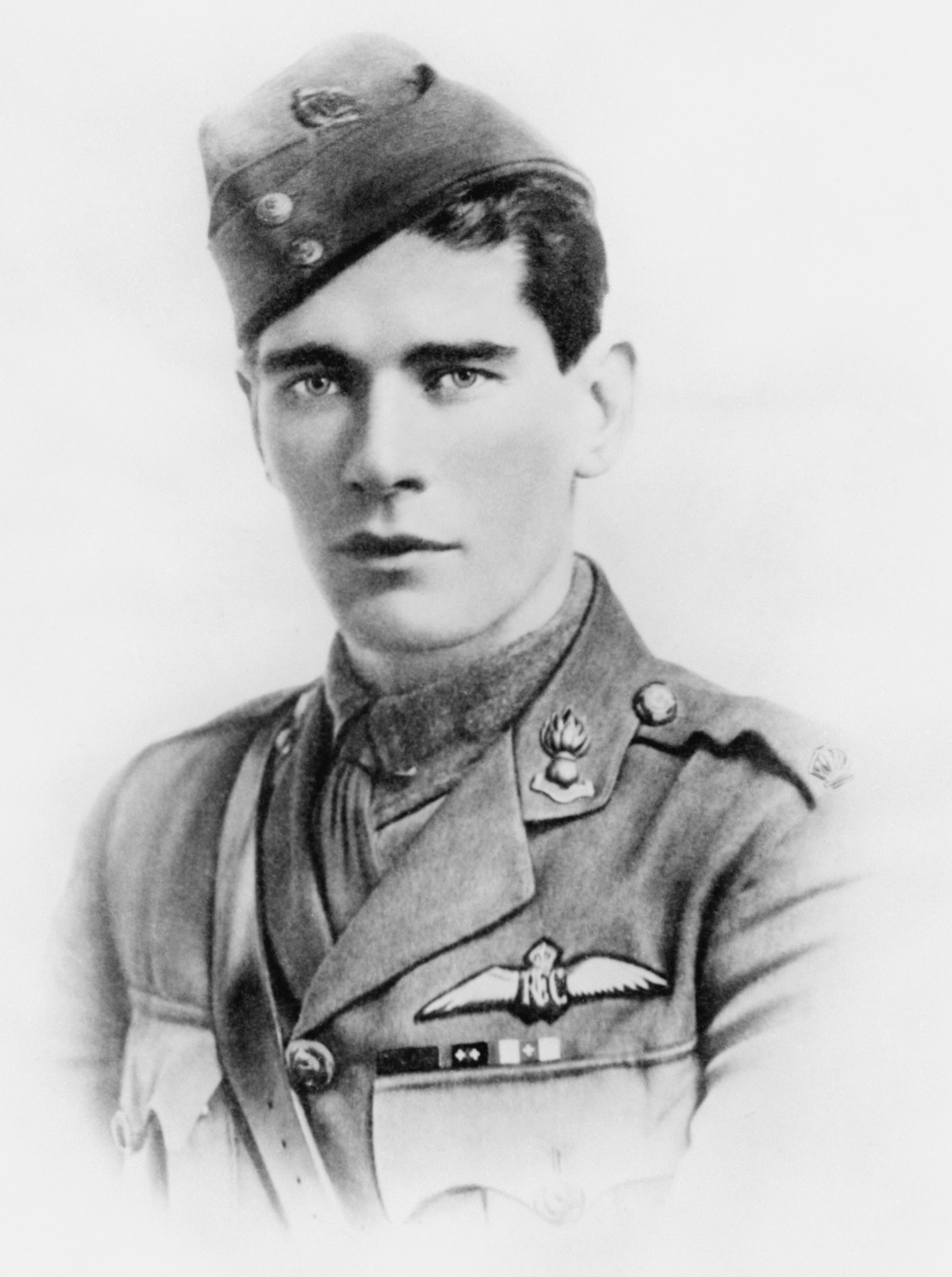
- Edward "Mick" Mannock RFC c. 1917
- Born: 24 May 1887; Unconfirmed, Britain or Ireland (Note: Although Mannock's birthplace cannot be verified, family documents suggest it was Cork where the family were living at this time. Mannock confused the issue by listing his birthday as 24 May 1888 when he joined the Territorial Force, casting doubt on the reliability of family sources. In early 1914, when Mannock applied for a passport to Turkey he stated his age as 24, when he was 26. When he applied to join the Royal Aero Club (RAeC) he put his birthplace down as Cork; which was affirmed by family members. Ira Jones writes that Mannock was born in Brighton on 24 May 1887. His father's unit, the 2nd Dragoons, were not stationed in Sussex until 1888. Jones' version has some acceptance.)
- Died: 26 July 1918 (aged 31); Calonne-sur-la-Lys, France
- Military career
- Allegiance: United Kingdom
- Branch: British Army; Royal Air Force
- Service years: 1911–1918
- Rank: Major
- Nickname: "Mick"
- Units: No. 40 Squadron RFC; No. 74 Squadron RFC
- Commands: No. 85 Squadron RAF
- Conflicts: First World War
- Awards: Victoria Cross; Distinguished Service Order & Two Bars; Military Cross & Bar

Edward Corringham "Mick" Mannock VC, DSO & Two Bars, MC & Bar (24 May 1887 – 26 July 1918) was a British-Irish flying ace who served in the Royal Flying Corps and Royal Air Force during the First World War. Mannock was a pioneer of fighter aircraft tactics in aerial warfare. At the time of his death he had amassed 61 aerial victories, making him the fifth highest scoring pilot of the war. Mannock was among the most decorated men in the British Armed Forces. He was honoured with the Military Cross twice, was one of the rare three-time recipients of the Distinguished Service Order, and was posthumously awarded the Victoria Cross.

Mannock was born in 1887 to an English father, Edward Mannock, and an Irish mother, Julia Sullivan. Mannock's father served in the British Army and the family moved to India when Mannock was a child. Young Mannock was sickly and developed several ailments in his formative years. Upon his return to England he became a fervent supporter of Irish nationalism and the Irish Home Rule movement but became a member of the Independent Labour Party.

In 1914, Mannock was working as a telephone engineer in Turkey. After the Ottoman Empire's entry into the war on the side of the Central Powers he was interned. Mannock was badly treated and soon fell ill. Turkish authorities repatriated him to Britain believing him to be unfit for war service. Mannock recovered and joined the Royal Engineers and then Royal Army Medical Corps. He moved services again and in 1916 joined Royal Flying Corps (RFC). After completing his training he was assigned to No. 40 Squadron RFC. Mannock went into combat on the Western Front, participating in three separate combat tours. After a slow start he began to prove himself as an exceptional pilot, scoring his first victory on 7 May 1917.

By February 1918, Mannock had achieved 16 victories and was appointed a Flight Commander in No. 74 Squadron. He amassed 36 more victories from 12 April—17 June 1918. After returning from leave Mannock was appointed commanding officer of No. 85 Squadron in July 1918, and scored nine more victories that month. Days after warning fellow ace George McElroy about the hazards of flying low into ground fire, that fate befell Mannock and he was killed in action dogfighting too close to the ground on 26 July 1918.

== Early life and education ==
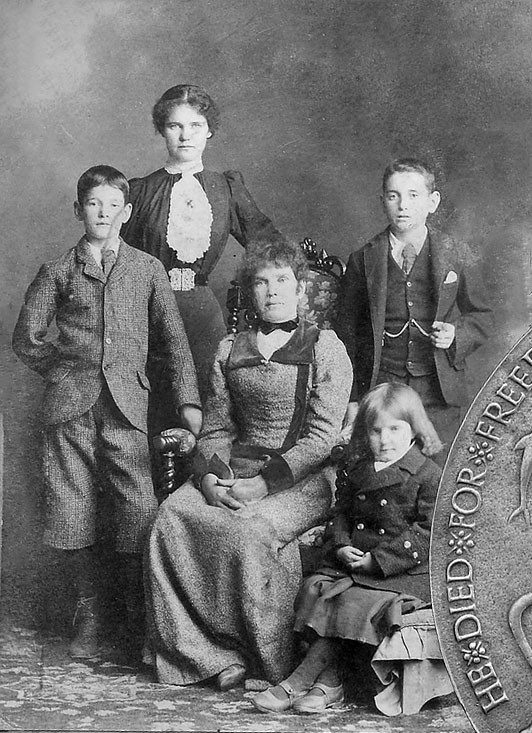
Mannock (far left) with family members

Edward Mannock was born on 24 May 1887 to Julia (née Sullivan) and Edward Mannock, of English, Irish and Scottish descent (married on 4 February 1883). Edward was the youngest of three; sister Jessie (b. December 1882) and Patrick (b. March 1886). Edward senior was from a wealthy family. His father was a newspaper editor on Fleet Street and his uncle George Mannock was a friend of the British royal family.

According to family legend, George had taught the Prince of Wales to play billiards. Edward senior was a Corporal in the British Army and distinguished himself in the Anglo-Egyptian War at the Battle of Tel el-Kebir in 1882. The Mannocks moved to Cork, Ireland in 1887 after his father left the army, and where it has been argued Mannock was born; though this is disputed and conflicting sources give his birth place as Ballincollig in Ireland or Brighton (Preston Barracks) in England.

In 1893, deeply in debt and exasperated with civilian life, Edward senior re-enlisted and the family moved to Meerut, India in May when Edward junior was five. Soon after arriving in Asia, Edward contracted malaria, narrowly avoiding death.

The young Mannock was a keen sports fan and he enjoyed cricket and football. Unlike some of his contemporaries he despised game hunting, and he kept birds and rabbits. As he grew older he became a keen angler. Mannock did enjoy shooting and used an air gun in target-shooting and he was also a passionate violin player, and was skilled with a variety of other instruments. When the Boer War began Mannock's father was transferred to South Africa where he fought in the 5th Dragoon Guards while the family stayed in India. When the war was over his father sent for the family and they moved to Canterbury in England. Mannock's father was a drunkard and suffered from depression. Two months after settling in England, he abandoned his wife and children and took the family's paltry savings with him.

Edward attended the local school, St. Thomas', and helped support the family with menial jobs. After leaving he was pressured by his mother into joining his brother at the National Telephone Company. After three years his health was affected by the stuffy office conditions and he applied, and was granted, a transfer to the engineering department. Mannock moved to Wellingborough, Northamptonshire in 1911 to take his position.

Mannock joined the Territorial Army and served in the Royal Army Medical Corps (RAMC) at this time to keep in touch with his friends from Canterbury at the annual camps. Mannock was promoted to sergeant in 1913. In the spring, he attended a local cricket match and was introduced to Clara Novello Davies, mother of composer Ivor Novello. Mannock was keen to develop his musical talents and was personally tutored by her. Through his local cricket club assumed an interest in politics. He became a political activist, expressed socialist views, was an admirer of Keir Hardie and became the Secretary of the Wellingborough Independent Labour Party in 1912.

Mannock remained a staunch supporter of the British Empire but sympathised with the Irish Home Rule movement. In the Wellingborough YMCA's mock parliament he sat as the Honourable Member for Waterford, the seat of John Redmond leader of the Irish Parliamentary Party.

Mannock applied for a passport at Christmas 1913, and received a stamped copy on 10 January 1914 describing himself as a telegraph and telephone mechanic. The original survives at the Royal Air Force Museum London in Hendon. On 9 February 1914, he abruptly ended his time in Wellingborough, and boarded a tramp steamer from Tilbury to Constantinople in Turkey to take a position at the Société Ottomane des Téléphones (Ottoman Telephone Exchange).

In 1914, as war became likely, Mannock and his fellow employees noticed a change in the political climate, and their Turkish hosts became openly hostile and anti-British. At the outbreak of war in Europe in August 1914, the country remained neutral. In October 1914 the Turks allied themselves with the Central Powers, the German Empire and Austria-Hungary. As an enemy subject he was interned.

Poorly fed and cared for, his health rapidly declined in prison. Dysentery racked his intestines and he was confined to a small cell. One night he managed to escape his cell by squeezing through the narrow confines of its window. Over the next nights, and during his transfer to the prisoners quarters, he forged an exit tunnel which he used on frequent raids to the Turkish Army food stores next-door. One night he was discovered and locked in a concrete box for two weeks. Near death, he was repatriated back to Britain and left Constantinople camp on 1 April 1915. On the two-month journey he contracted malaria once again, surviving the parasite before reaching England via Bulgaria and Greece.

== War service ==
=== Royal Engineers and Royal Army Medical Corps ===
On 22 May 1915 Mannock reported for duty with the Royal Army Medical Corps (RAMC) and by July he was sufficiently recovered to join them at his pre-war rank of sergeant. On 25 May he was assigned to the 3rd company, second battalion Home Countries Field Ambulance Service. Upon joining, he found that he had to attend German wounded as well as British and French; something which he found distasteful.

Mannock immediately detected apathy in his old service. In his opinion the men lacked enthusiasm for the job of winning the war. He complained bitterly at their half-hearted efforts during practice drills. While there, Mannock attempted to start a branch of the Wellingborough Parliament to instil some patriotism, pride and professionalism but failed. While tending to some wounded soldiers, Mannock sought an audience with his commanding officer. He refused to continue driving ambulances or tending the sick while thousands died in battle and requested a transfer to the Royal Engineers (RE) as an officer cadet. Mannock waited for months and his rank rose from sergeant to sergeant-major. Finally, in March 1916 he was finally granted his transfer after an interview at the local recruitment office in Fenny Stratford.

Mannock was conscious his poor education and lower-class background would put him at a considerable disadvantage in the well-educated and higher-class surroundings of the RE. Mannock's solution to his problem was to throw himself into his work. The method was practical but his insular behaviour was construed as odd. Mannock despised his peers who were uninterested in the war and seemed concerned only with the uniforms, quality tailoring and how it would improve their chances with women. Tired of the banal conversations and lethargy of his comrades, Mannock wanted to leave the RE but realised a second resignation would damage his chances of becoming a commissioned officer.

At the suggestion of a friend – Eric Tomkins – Mannock decided to join the Royal Flying Corps (RFC). Mannock was initially reticent, concerned his age and physical condition would hinder him. His early departure from two other services may also have encouraged questions about his reliability. Mannock acquired all the newspapers he could for information on the air war. In so doing, he came across an article on the man who was to have a profound effect on him: Albert Ball. Ball was the first fighter pilot to be given any publicity and his exploits inspired Mannock to transfer. In June Mannock was promoted to second lieutenant and on 14 August 1916 he arrived at the No. 1 School of Military Aeronautics in Reading.

=== Royal Flying Corps ===
Mannock's training began immediately. He received instruction on aerial gunnery, aircraft-rigging, map reading and flight theory. He passed with honours and was sent to Hendon for elementary flying instruction. On 28 November 1916 he received Royal Aero Club (RAeC) certificate 3895. On 5 December he moved to Hounslow to begin training with No. 19 Training Squadron flying the Henry Farman. After completing his course he was moved to the Hythe School of Gunnery on 1 February 1917 for two weeks and then to No. 10 Reserve Squadron at Joyce Green for advanced training. Mannock's instructor, Captain Chapman said of him, " he made his first solo flight with but a few hours' instruction, for he seemed to master the rudiments of flying with his first hour in the air and from then on threw the machine about as he pleased".

At Joyce Green Mannock met Captain James McCudden. McCudden taught Mannock about air fighting. McCudden stressed team tactics and offensive use of the aeroplane. McCudden said of Mannock, "The pupils here during the period of which I write were very good. One I particularly remember was named Mannock. Mannock was a typical example of the impetuous young Irishman, and I always thought he was of the type to do or die".

Meredith Thomas also met Mannock at Joyce Green in February 1917. Thomas recalled how they were told not to turn below 2,000 feet in an Airco DH.2 pusher. Mannock did so and got into a spin at 1,000 feet (300 m), deliberately. He was keen to see if he could recover the aircraft from such an attitude. Mannock stalled the aircraft, purposely, and followed McCudden's advice; allow it to come out of the stall and centralise the controls, apply opposite rudder in the spin and as the spin slows ease the nose down. Mannock had discovered that air combat was a science and could be perfected. Regardless, his actions earned him a rebuke from his commanding officer, Keith Caldwell.

Mannock was somewhat older than his peers in the RFC and had experienced the brutality of war first-hand. Meredith Thomas remembered this earned him a reputation as a serious-minded man. Mannock was inclined to be reserved, but was a good conversationalist, patient and willing to assist others but quick to anger. He masked his hatred of the Turks but the intensity with which he carried out his training was sometimes misunderstood.

=== First combats ===
Confident in his skill, Mannock arrived in France on 31 March 1917 at 40 Squadron headquarters near Aire, Lens. He did not give his new squadron-mates a good first impression. On his first night he inadvertently sat down in the chair of a popular pilot killed that day and proceeded to ask pilots about their personal scores and offer, without invitation, his own views on air combat. Lieutenant Lionel Blaxland recalled; "He seemed a boorish know-all, we all felt the quicker he got amongst the Huns the better; that would show him how little he knew". Mannock flew the squadron's Nieuport 17 scout the following day. As the days passed, he preferred to remain airborne by virtue of his squadron's hostility. The public school boy-dominated squadron detested his "gutter politics" and mannerisms although Mannock was befriended by Irishman Lieutenant de Burgh, of the same ilk. Mannock forged friendships with new pilots. George McElroy arrived in September and became Mannock's protégé.

Mannock had initially to overcome his fear of combat. On 13 April he crossed into no man's land for the first time during the opening days of the Arras offensive and was subjected to German anti-aircraft artillery for the first time. He mishandled his aircraft and dropped out of formation. Subsequent patrols did not abate his fear. A man who performed in such a manner was suspect and he was shunned in the mess. On 19 April 1917, and in view of the entire squadron, Mannock finally won some respect when he landed his aircraft during a firing practice after the lower right wing tore away. Mannock forced himself into the air again and continued to practice. Eventually he adopted the tactic of closing to within 20 or 30 yards to open fire.

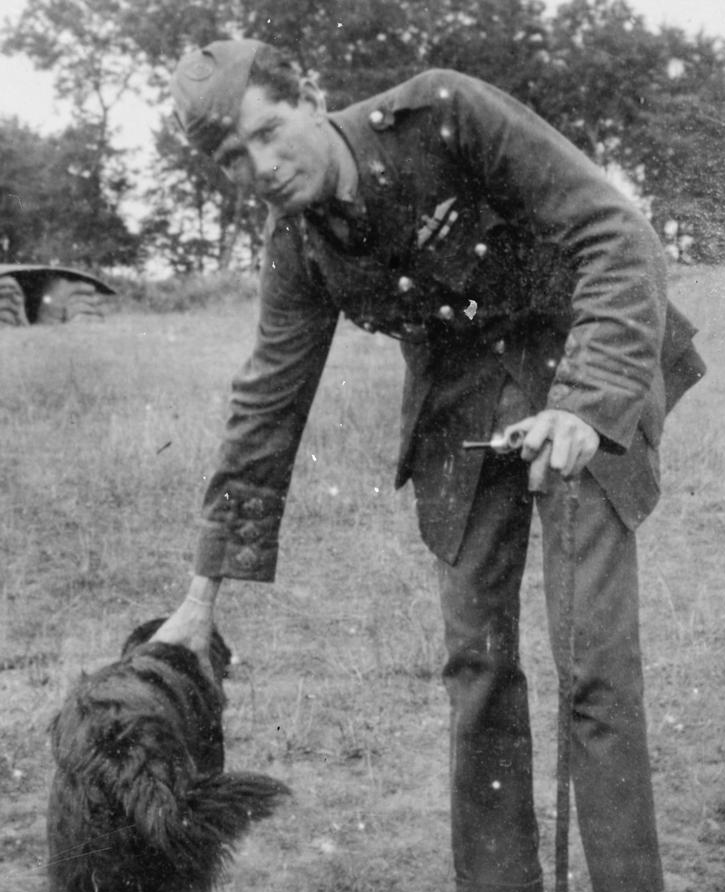
Mannock with his dog

On 1 May 1917 40 Squadron escorted four Sopwith 1½ Strutters to the German airfield at Douai—the home of Jagdstaffel 11 (Jasta 11) commanded by Manfred von Richthofen the famed Red Baron. In the fight he evaded enemy aircraft but could not claim a success. Finally, on 7 May 1917—incidentally the day his inspiration Albert Ball died in a dogfight involving the Red Baron's younger brother, Lothar von Richthofen—Mannock shot down an observation balloon, a respected achievement since the aircraft was heavily defended. 40 Squadron lost a pilot, Captain William Nixon, a flight commander aged 19 from Derbyshire, to five intercepting Albatros D.IIIs led by Lothar von Richthofen. Despite his growing experience Mannock remained outside the circle of friends in the squadron because of his apparent and initial lack of effort and success. He withdrew from their company and concentrated on improving. Alone, his nervousness disappeared and he made friends and acquaintances, but mostly outside the squadron.

On 7 June he shot down an Albatros D.III for his second victory and on 9 June claimed a reconnaissance aircraft and an Albatros D.V but did not receive credit. On 14 June he was sent home on leave owing to exhaustion and spent two weeks in England. On 12 and 13 July he received credits for a DFW C.V taking his total to four. On the later date he claimed a third DFW but was denied official recognition for lack of witnesses. Mannock went to view his third victory which had fallen in friendly lines. The observer had survived but the pilot was dead. He forced himself to search the wreck and discovered the remains. The sight of a little black terrier mascot—dead in the observer's seat—upset Mannock for days. He wrote in his diary, "I felt exactly like a murderer."

On 19 July Mannock was awarded the Military Cross (MC), which was published in the London Gazette on 17 September when the citation included successes he achieved in the intervening period. He received the personal congratulations of the AOC (Air Officer Commanding) Hugh Trenchard upon receiving his award at Béthune.

On 28 July Mannock reported an Albatros D.V and two balloons shot down but these also went uncredited. On that day Mannock engaged a purple Albatross DV and claimed hits on the enemy leader. This may well have been Jagdstaffel 12 commanding officer Adolf Ritter von Tutschek. Joachim von Bertrab was taken prisoner of war on 12 August when forced down behind British lines for Mannock's 6th victory. Bertrab's fighter caught fire but his close proximity to the ground (1,000 ft) enabled him to make a controlled landing and escape the fire with a fractured left arm and wounds to the right arm and leg. Mannock also made two further uncredited claims in his combat report but they were not even marked as uncredited in official sources. An RFC communiqué announced he been credited with only one victory this day.

During the Third Ypres campaign Mannock increased in piloting stature. In August he shot down five Albatros D.V and a DFW C.V plus one uncredited Albatros. His tally had reached nine victories and had passed the threshold of five required to become a fighter ace. In September he shot down six more enemy aircraft including a Rumpler C.I or Rumpler C.III and five DFW D.Vs raising his tally to 15. All of these enemies were felled in a Nieuport 23.

Mannock made only one claim on 25 September, his last for 1917. The combat report for that day describes an incident in which he fired on an enemy reconnaissance aircraft at 16,000 ft but ran out of ammunition. The machine's propeller stopped but it glided eastward. Another was fired on this day and dived toward German lines apparently damaged. Mannock made no claim for these combats. Biographer Norman Franks suggests his total may have been slightly higher than official figure of 61.

Mannock's practice sessions had paid off. After one victory, he wrote, "My man gave me an easy mark. I was only ten yards away from him—on top so I couldn't miss! A beautifully coloured insect he was—red, blue, green, yellow. I let him have 60 rounds at that range, so there wasn't much left of him".

=== No. 74 Squadron ===
In early October 1917, Mannock returned to England on leave as the battle at Ypres descended into stalemate. While on leave on 18 October 1917 he was awarded the bar to the Military Cross. As a consequence of his vacation he missed the Battle of Cambrai which began on 20 November 1917. Mannock was, however, present for other developments. On 23 November the squadron began to convert to the S.E.5. Piloting his personal mount, B4884, he damaged the fighter when force landing after engine trouble at Dainville. Mannock's morale seemed high. He wrote to his sister on 21 November after returning to France, "Hope all is well in Birmingham. Plenty of work for the airmen and plenty of casualties. Am doing special air work by myself now. A big feather in my cap. Am expecting the D.S.O soon, but may get a white cross instead. Who cares anyway. PS, I have got 16 Huns down to date".

The S.E.5 carried two guns. A .303 calibre Lewis gun was mounted on the top wing, positioned to fire outside the propeller arc. The weapon was drum-fed and could be pulled down to replenish the magazine. It could also be adjusted, in flight, to fire vertically at an enemy that was positioned above. The other was a belt–fed Vickers machine gun, also of .303 calibre which was mounted on top of the fuselage over the engine and its cowling. The weapon's fire could pass through the propeller arc by virtue of interrupter gear. The 200 horse power Hispano-Suiza 8 engine was troublesome but the machine could reach 118 mph at 10,000 ft in level flight. Mannock's first success in the S.E.5 nearly came on 9 December but the enemy Albatros escaped when his guns jammed. On New Year's Day 1918 Mannock scored his first victory in the S.E.5—it was his 16th and last with 40 Squadron. The crew were killed when the Hannover CL.III crashed. When he landed, Mannock was promptly dispatched back to England the following day.

Mannock's fifteen rules on air combat

1. Pilots must dive to attack with zest, and must hold their fire until they get within one hundred yards of the target
2. Achieve surprise by approaching from the east (German side of the front)
3. Utilize the sun's glare and clouds to achieve surprise
4. Pilots must keep physically fit by exercise and the moderate use of stimulants
5. Pilots must sight their guns and practice as much as possible. Targets are fleeting.
6. Pilots must practice spotting machines in the air and recognizing them at long range, and every aeroplane is to be treated as an enemy until it is certain it is not
7. Pilots must learn where the enemy's blind spots are
8. Scouts must be attacked from above and two-seaters from beneath their tails
9. Pilots must practice quick turns, as this manoeuvre is used more than any other in a fight
10. Pilots must practice judging distances in flight as these are very deceptive
11. Decoys must be guarded against—a single enemy is often a decoy—therefore the air above must be searched before attacking
12. If the day is sunny, machines should be turned with as little bank as possible; otherwise the sun glistening on their wings will give away their positions at long range
13. Pilots must keep turning in a dogfight and never fly straight unless firing
14. Pilots must never dive away from an enemy, as he gives an opponent a non-deflection shot—bullets are faster than aeroplanes
15. Pilots must keep an eye on their watches during patrols, on the direction and strength of the wind

Before departing France, Mannock met with McElroy, Jones and McCudden and they took a car to Boulogne. Mannock's reputation had spread well beyond the confines of his squadron and mechanics, junior officers and comrades lined the road to form an honour guard as he drove away. In Boulogne Mannock stopped at a hospital to bid farewell to an Irish nurse called Murphy; whether the two were involved in a relationship is unknown. In January Mannock toured England, visiting London, Birmingham, and Northampton to rest with family.

Mannock visited Biggin Hill, an aerodrome situated on high ground near Croydon. At the time this was used for carrying out wireless experiments under Major H T B Childs. It is not known if Mannock participated in these tests. Save for one Sopwith Pup, the aerodrome had no aircraft for some time until 141 Squadron took residence with Bristol F.2 Fighters to protect against Zeppelin and Gotha G.V air raids. The squadron arrival coincided with Mannock's posting to 74 Squadron at London Colney. The formation was formed in July 1917 at Northolt as a Training Depot Squadron (TDS) and then Training Squadron (TS). It was seen fit to promote the unit to combat operations and give Mannock a position of senior flight commander in February 1918.

In March 1918 74 was sent to France equipped with S.E.5s at a time when most RFC squadrons operated Sopwith Camels. Mannock respected the S.E.5 but preferred to have both of the machine guns firing through the propeller arc and situated in front of the pilot on the engine cowling. Some squadrons, including 85—whom Mannock commanded later—were scheduled to be equipped with the Sopwith Dolphin but losses compelled operating squadrons to maintain the old Camels for ease of replacement. Commanding officer of 74 Squadron, Keith Caldwell, appointed Mannock as a senior flight commander. Mannock immediately began training the inexperienced squadron combat patrol tactics. Mannock's well known phrase became the squadron's mantra: "Gentlemen, always above; seldom on the same level; never underneath".

On 27 March, one week after the beginning of the German spring offensive, Operation Michael, the squadron was ordered to Goldhanger, Essex and put on standby. On 30 March Mannock was ordered to Saint-Omer-en-Chaussée. On 1 April 1918—the day the Royal Air Force (RAF) came into being—it was moved to Teteghem near Dunkirk. A week later they transferred to La Lovie, west of Ypres. On 11 April the unit flew to Clairmarias east of Saint Omer. Twenty-four hours later, Mannock downed two Albatros D.Vs for his 17th and 18th victories. It was possible that Jasta 29 were 74's opponents. Losses are difficult to determine as German sources recorded losses only in personnel, not aircraft. On this day six were killed, one captured and two wounded. Vizfeldwebel Gilbert Wagner was killed on 12 April in the vicinity of the battle.

Under his command A Flight scored many successes. Among the growing list of aces were Henry Eric Dolan and George McElroy. Mannock's own score increased to 20 by the end of the month. On 23 and 29 April he downed a Pfalz D.III and Fokker D.VI. Leutnant Ludwig Vortmann of Jasta 2 became Mannock's 20th victory.

Mannock was awarded the Distinguished Service Order on 9 May 1918. The recommendation for the DSO was not signed by the King until two months after Mannock's death. (Note: The recommendation was made on 9 May. The news was announced on 19 May. The recommendation was not signed by the King until September 1918.) This month Mannock nearly doubled his tally from 21 to 41. On 12 May he accounted for a trio of fighters—two Albatros D.Vs and a Pfalz D.III but the squadron lost Henry Eric Dolan. Mannock lamented his loss. Mannock again achieved two victories on 17 May. On 21 May in dogfights around Ypres he downed four enemies including three Pfalz D.IIIs; one in the morning patrol and three in the evening patrol within the space of five minutes. Two more confirmed victories on 26 and 29 May brought his tally to 41. On the later date Mannock received the Bar to his DSO.

=== Commanding No. 85 Squadron ===
74 Squadron had begun to make a name for itself in 1917. It boasted several aces; commanding officer Keith Caldwell, Andrew Kiddie, Benjamin Roxburgh-Smith and James Ira Thomas Jones were some of the squadron's highest achievers.

On 1 June 1918, east of Merville, 74 Squadron engaged Jasta 7 and Jasta 52, led by Paul Billik. Billik shot down and killed William Cairnes, who became the German ace's 19th victory. Cairnes had reached the threshold of five victories only two days earlier on 30 May. Incidentally, Billik had also accounted for Mannock's old squadron commander, Major L. A Tilney, on 9 March. Mannock attacked with his flight from above and in front of the German squadrons and downed three Pfalz D.III in the air battle.

Over the next eight days Mannock achieved double victories on 6, 9 and 16 June. He noted the position as "28 J 30 C 3 5". On the evening of 6 June Mannock wrote home to his family that he now had 51 victories. (Mannock acknowledged in his letter that only 47 of his claims were officially recognised.) On 16 June 1918 he surpassed the 50–mark and ended the day of operations on 51 recognized aerial victories. At this time Mannock was the highest scoring pilot from the British Isles still on active operations, since the departure of James McCudden in February. As of this date, only McCudden and Manfred von Richthofen had shot down more aircraft than Mannock. The following morning Mannock accounted for another enemy aircraft on an offensive patrol. The German reconnaissance machine was Mannock's 52nd and final victory with 74 Squadron.

On 18 June 1918 Mannock was sent to England on leave. He travelled to Birmingham to visit his mother. The visit was not an easy one as she had become an alcoholic. On this visit family friends reported on his state of mind. Mannock broke down on one occasion and seemed full of nervous tension. This was possibly due to combat fatigue. Major Caldwell noted Mannock never took time off unless it was officially scheduled leave and he never reported sick, but saw no signs that Mannock was about to crack-up. Mannock also did not want a command and preferred to remain on operations with 74 Squadron. As a senior flight commander Mannock never showed weakness in front of his men.

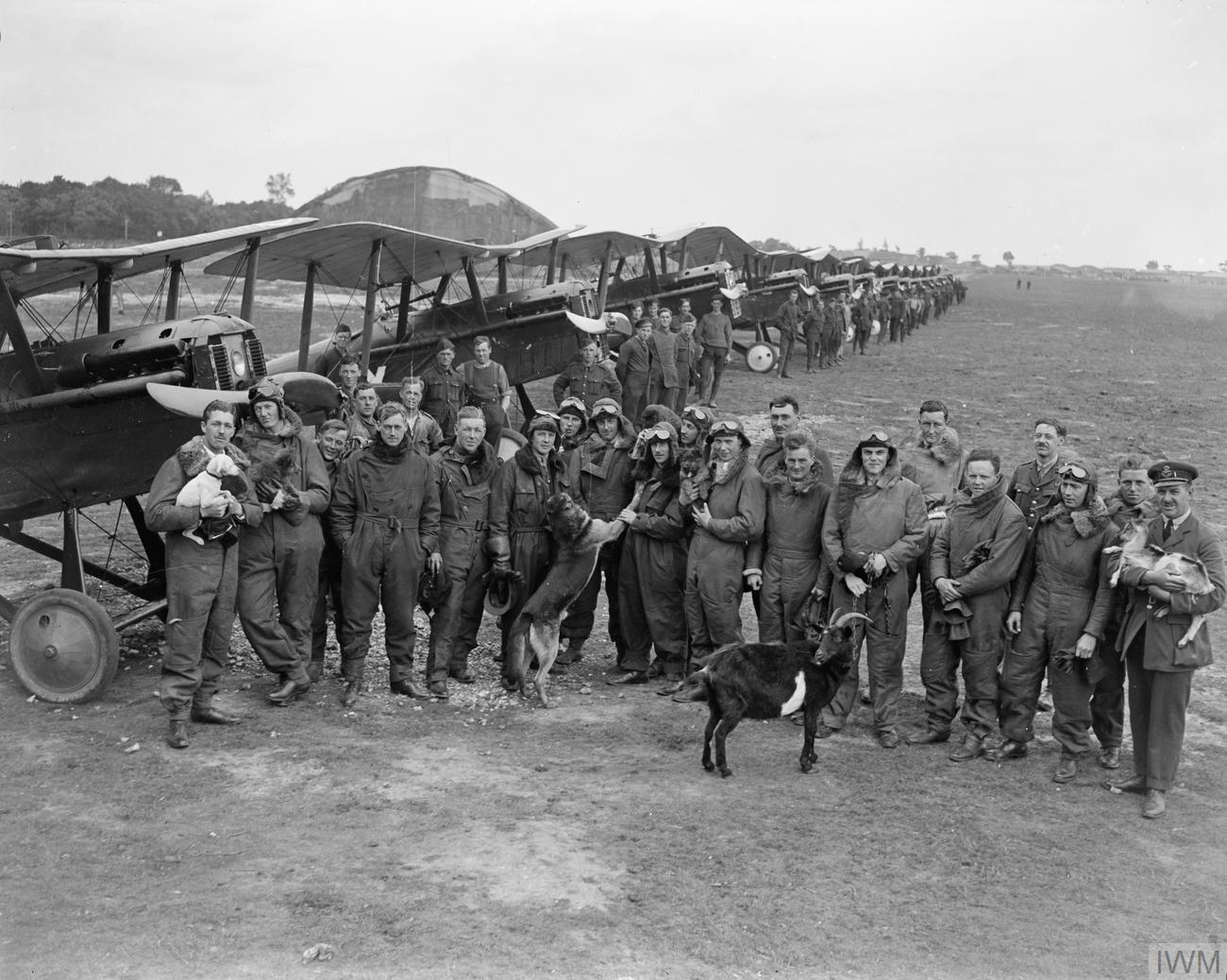
The officers of No. 85 Squadron, including Major Mannock, in front of their S.E.5a scouts at Saint-Omer aerodrome.

Mannock took command of No. 85 Squadron RAF on 5 July 1918. The morale of the unit was different to that of 74 Squadron. The former commanding officer, Billy Bishop, did not develop into a patrol leader, nor had he encouraged that method of command that was now expected. The squadron boasted several fighter aces: Alec Cunningham-Reid, Spencer B. Horn, Malcolm C. McGregor and Walter H. Longton. Mannock had a cadre of experienced pilots to build his leadership around.

Mannock scored his first enemy aircraft with 85 Squadron on 7 July when he downed two Fokker D.VII fighters in the same fight for his 53rd and 54th victories. Two days later he learned that McCudden had been killed in an accident which was a bitter blow to Mannock. On 14 July Mannock scored his 55th victory and claimed another on 19 July. On the late morning of 20 July 1918 Mannock accounted for a reconnaissance aircraft and two Fokker D.VII fighters in the same battle. A Fokker Dr.I on 22 July took Mannock's personal tally to 60.

On 20 July, at a farewell luncheon for his friend "Noisy" Lewis, Mannock took their mutual friend George McElroy aside to counsel him on the hazards of following a German victim down within range of ground fire.

== Death ==
On 26 July, Major Mannock offered to help a new arrival, Lt. Donald C. Inglis from New Zealand, obtain his first victory. After shooting down an enemy LVG two-seater behind the German front-line, Mannock is believed to have dived to the crash site to view the wreckage, seemingly breaking one of the unwritten rules of fellow pilots. In consequence, while crossing the trenches the fighters were met with a massive volley of ground-fire. The engine of Mannock's aircraft was hit and immediately caught fire, and shortly thereafter the plane crashed behind German lines. Mannock's body is believed to have been found, though this is unproven, about 250 yards (250m) from the wreck of his machine, perhaps thrown, perhaps jumped. The body showed no gunshot wounds, and Mannock had vowed to shoot himself if shot down in flames. The BBC Timewatch programme "WW1 Aces Falling" details the search to prove whether or not that this body was that of Mannock. Inglis described what happened:

Falling in behind Mick again we made a couple of circles around the burning wreck and then made for home. I saw Mick start to kick his rudder, then I saw a flame come out of his machine; it grew bigger and bigger. Mick was no longer kicking his rudder. His nose dropped slightly and he went into a slow right-hand turn, and hit the ground in a burst of flame. I circled at about twenty feet but could not see him, and as things were getting hot, made for home and managed to reach our outposts with a punctured fuel tank. Poor Mick ...the bloody bastards had shot my Major down in flames.

== Memorials and tributes ==
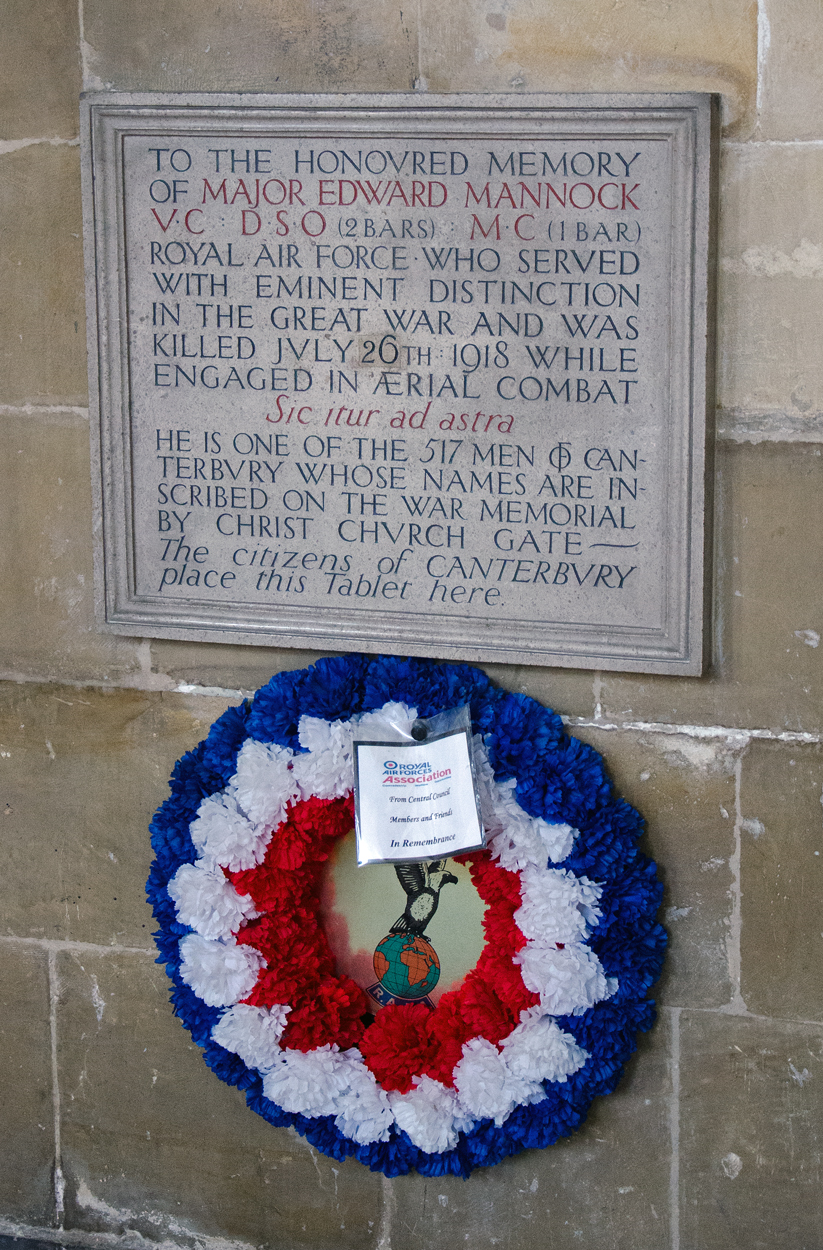
Memorial in Canterbury Cathedral installed in 1925

The exact cause of Mannock's death remains uncertain. A year later, after intensive lobbying by Ira Jones and many of Mannock's former comrades, he was awarded the Victoria Cross.

Mannock's body was not subsequently recovered by the Commonwealth War Graves Commission (CWGC), so officially he has no known grave. His name is commemorated on the Royal Flying Corps Memorial to the Missing at the Faubourg d'Amiens CWGC Cemetery in Arras. There is also a memorial plaque in honour of Mannock in Canterbury Cathedral.

Mick Mannock's name is listed on the Wellingborough War Memorial with the other fallen men from the town and the local Air Training Corps unit bears his name – 378 (Mannock) Squadron. Additionally, a residential street in Wellingborough is named after Major Mannock: Mannock Road.

On 24 June 1988 a plaque was unveiled at 183 Mill Road, Wellingborough by top scoring World War II British fighter pilot Air Vice-Marshal Johnnie Johnson. Mannock had lived at that address prior to the War after being befriended by the Eyles family.

Between November 1968 and January 2001, Vickers VC10 C1K serial XV103 was named 'Edward Mannock VC' in commemoration of Mannock. (Note: Other RAF VC10 aircraft were named after Victoria Cross holders.) This scroll was transferred to VC10 K3 ZA149 after 2001, and to ZA147 in March 2013 upon the retirement of XV103 and ZA149 respectively. ZA147 was retired in September 2013.

In 2009, one of the last photographs ever taken of Mannock was discovered in Northern France. The photograph was found in an old album belonging to a French farmer whose land had been used by the Royal Air Force during the summer of 1918. The photograph shows Mannock in RAF uniform. He is standing on a farm track holding a walking stick and gloves with his right hand. His left hand rests on the shoulder of a dark-haired young French girl.

In a BBC Timewatch programme entitled "WWI Aces Falling", broadcast on 21 March 2009, researchers suggested that the unidentified remains of a British airman recovered soon after the war from a temporary grave near Mannock's crash site and reburied in Plot III, Row F, Grave #12 of Laventie CWGC war cemetery, could be those of Mick Mannock.

A pencil drawing, reputed to be of Mannock, was discovered rolled and hidden in a wing by a team restoring a First World War-era aircraft on behalf of Peter Jackson.

== List of air victories ==
Mannock is officially credited with 61 victories: 1 balloon destroyed, 3 (and 2 shared) captured, 30 (and 5 shared) destroyed, 17 (and 3 shared) "out of control" in an itemised list of his approved claims (as seen below).

There was a posthumous attempt by former 74 Squadron comrade and fellow ace Ira Jones to credit his old friend with 73 victories and therefore the top scoring British Empire ace. However research suggests that assertion was faulty. Some of the 73 accredited by Jones to Mannock and published in full by James Dudgeon in 1981, appear duplicated in error, misdated, shared claims, or unconfirmed claims.

Confirmed victories are numbered; unconfirmed victories are denoted by "u/c".

No.	Date	Time	Aircraft	Foe	Result	Location	Notes
1	7 May 1917	09:35	Nieuport 23 s/n A6733	Observation balloon	Destroyed	Quiéry-la-Motte	Mannock's initial victory with 40 Squadron
2	7 June 1917	07:15	Nieuport 23 s/n B1552	Albatros D.III	Driven down out of control	North of Lille	Shared with FE-2 of Lieutenants C. J Lally and L. F Williams, 25 Sqn. Possibly Vzfw. Eberlein Jasta 33, wounded.
u/c	9 June 1917			Albatros D.V	Driven down		
u/c	9 June 1917			Albatros D.V	Driven down		
3	12 July 1917	10:10	Nieuport 23 s/n B1682	DFW C.V	Captured	Avion	Vizefeldwebel Willi Reubelt killed. Vizefeldwebel Hermann Johann Böttcher, captured. (Schlasta 12).
4	13 July 1917	09:20	Nieuport 23 s/n B1682	DFW reconnaissance plane	Driven down out of control	Sallaumines	Observer Leutnant. Heinz Walkermann, wounded. Machine from Flieger-Abteilung (A) 20.
u/c	13 July 1917			German reconnaissance plane	Driven down		
u/c	28 July 1917			Albatros D.V	Driven down		Possibly Adolf Ritter von Tutschek, who returned to base.
u/c	28 July 1917			Two observation balloons			
5	5 August 1917	16:10	Nieuport 23 s/n B3554	Albatros D.V	Driven down out of control	Avion	
6	12 August 1917	15:15	Nieuport 23 s/n B3554	Albatros D.V	Captured	Southeast of Petit-Vimy	Joachim von Bertrab (Jasta 30) POW. Bertrab was given POW number 478.
7	15 August 1917	12:15	Nieuport 23 s/n B3554	Albatros D.V	Driven down out of control	Lens	
8	15 August 1917	19:30	Nieuport 23 s/n B3554	Albatros D.V	Driven down out of control	North of Lens	Probably Leutnant Heinrich Brügmann (Jasta 30). Died of wounds on the way to hospital, at 2 p.m the following day.
9	17 August 1917	10:50	Nieuport 23 s/n B3554	DFW reconnaissance plane	Destroyed		Possibly from RHBZ (Reihenbildzug 6). Oberleutnant Karl Heine was wounded. Fate of pilot unknown.
u/c	22 August 1917			Albatros D.V	Driven down		
10	4 September 1917	11:30	Nieuport 24 s/n B3607	DFW reconnaissance plane	Driven down out of control	East of Lens-Lievin	Shared with Sergeant Herbert; probably Vizefeldwebel Eddelbuttel and Leutnant Kuhn (FAA 240) both wounded.
11	4 September 1917	16:30	Nieuport 24 s/n B3607	DFW reconnaissance plane	Captured	Petit-Vimy	Unteroffizier Georg Frischkorn (pilot) and Vizefeldwebel Fritz Frech both killed. The men were from FAA235 (A). The machine was destroyed but for some reason classified captured.
12	11 September 1917	11:15	Nieuport 24 s/n B3607	DFW reconnaissance plane	Driven down out of control	Thélus-Oppy	
13	20 September 1917	17:35	Nieuport 24 s/n B3607	DFW reconnaissance plane	Driven down out of control	Hulloch	Possibly Unteroffizier Halbreiter and observer Leutnant Artur Beauchamp, both killed. The men belonged to FA 240 (A).
14	23 September 1917	16:45	Nieuport 23 s/n B3541	Enemy reconnaissance plane	Set afire; destroyed	Oppy	
15	25 September 1917	15:10	Nieuport 24 s/n B3607	Rumpler C reconnaissance plane	Driven down out of control	Sallaumines	Vizefeldwebel Meckes, wounded and Leutnant Paul Friedrich Otto, killed. FA224(A)w.
16	1 January 1918	11:35	RAF SE.5a s/n B665	Hannover CL.III	Captured	Fampoux	Vizefeldwebel Fritz Korbacher and Leutnant Wilhelm Klein from FA258(A), both killed.
17	12 April 1918	09:00	RAF SE.5a s/n D278	Albatros D.V	Destroyed	East of Merville	Mannock's first victory with 74 Squadron
18	12 April 1918	14:40	RAF SE.5a s/n D278	Albatros D.V	Destroyed	Bois de Phalempin	shared with 4 other 74 Sqn pilots
19	23 April 1918	18:10	RAF SE.5a s/n D278	Pfalz D.III	Set afire; destroyed	East of Merville	Either Gefreiter Jupp Böhne or Leutnant Paul Lotz (future commanding officer of Jagdstaffel 44) from Jasta 7. Both unhurt.
20	29 April 1918	11:40	RAF SE.5a s/n D278	Fokker D.VI	Set afire; destroyed	South of Dickebusch Lake (Dikkebusvijver)	Leutnant Ludwig Vortmann killed (Jasta 2).
21	30 April 1918	11:40	RAF SE.5a s/n D278	Albatros reconnaissance plane	Captured	Southeast of Dickebusch Lake	Shared with Henry Eric Dolan. Flieger Anton Zimmermann died of wounds, and Vizefeldwebel Speer, captured. Zimmermann appears have belonged to Schusta 28 and was borrowed to be Speer's observer. He died on 1 May. Speer, of Schlasta 10, was captured.
22	3 May 1918	18:55	RAF SE.5a s/n D278	LVG reconnaissance plane	Destroyed	South of Merville	Shared with A.C Kiddie, Dolan and H. G Clements. Unteroffizier Fritz Schöning and Leutnant Fritz Buettler, of FA32, were both killed.
23	6 May 1918	09:20	RAF SE.5a s/n D278	Fokker Triplane	Destroyed	Gheluvelt	Leutnant Günther Derlin, (Jasta 20), killed.
24	11 May 1918	17:40	RAF SE.5a s/n C1112	Pfalz D.IIIa	Set afire; destroyed	Northeast of Armentières	Leutnant Otto Aeckerle from Jasta 47, in Pfalz D.IIIa 5916/17, killed. Died one day before his 24th birthday.
25	12 May 1918	18:20	RAF SE.5a s/n C1112	Albatros D.V	Destroyed	North of Wulverghem	
26	12 May 1918	18:20	RAF SE.5a s/n C1112	Albatros D.V	Destroyed	North of Wulverghem	
27	12 May 1918	18:20 hours	RAF SE.5a s/n C1112	Pfalz D.III	Destroyed	North of Wulverghem	
28	16 May 1918	11:00	RAF SE.5a s/n C1112	Pfalz D.III	Destroyed	Southwest of Houthulst Forest	
29	17 May 1918	11:20	RAF SE.5a s/n D278	Pfalz D.III	Set afire; destroyed	South of Bailleul	
30	17 May 1918	14:30	RAF SE.5a s/n D278	Albatros reconnaissance plane	Set afire; destroyed	Northeast of Ypres	
31	18 May 1918	08:25	RAF SE.5a s/n D278	Albatros C reconnaissance plane	Set afire; destroyed	Steenwerck	Leutnant Karl Fischer and Leutnant Georg Emil Pitz, of FA19, both killed.
32	21 May 1918	09:28	RAF SE.5a s/n D278	Hannover reconnaissance plane	Destroyed	La Courenne	Gefreiter Walter Menzel and Leutnant Friedrich August Steinmeyer, of FA9, both killed.
33	21 May 1918	19:00	RAF SE.5a s/n D278	Pfalz D.III	Destroyed	Hollebeke	
34	21 May 1918	19:00	RAF SE.5a s/n D278	Pfalz D.III	Destroyed	Hollebeke	
35	21 May 1918	19:05	RAF SE.5a s/n D278	Pfalz D.III	Destroyed	South of Hollebeke	No losses in aircraft were recorded, only personnel. Possibly Vizefeldwebel Hans Schorn from Jasta 16b killed.
36	22 May 1918	18:15	RAF SE.5a s/n D278	Pfalz D.III	Driven down out of control	Fromelles	
37	26 May 1918	19:40	RAF SE.5a s/n D278	Pfalz D.III	Set afire; destroyed	Half a mile south of Bailleul	
38	26 May 1918	19:40	RAF SE.5a s/n D278	Albatros D.V	Driven down out of control.	South of Bailleul	
39	29 May 1918	19:25	RAF SE.5a s/n C6468	Albatros D.V	Set afire; destroyed	Northeast of Armentières	
40	29 May 1918	20:05	RAF SE.5a s/n C6468	Albatros D.V	Driven down out of control	Northeast of Armentières	
u/c	29 May 1918				Driven down		
41	31 May 1918	19:40	RAF SE.5a s/n C6468	Pfalz D.III	Driven down out of control	North of Wijtschate (Wytschaete)	
42	1 June 1918	16:30	RAF SE.5a s/n C6468	Pfalz D.III	Destroyed	Estaires	
43	1 June 1918	16:30	RAF SE.5a s/n C6468	Pfalz D.III	Destroyed	Estaires	
44	1 June 1918	16:30	RAF SE.5a s/n C6468	Pfalz D.III	Driven down out of control	Estaires	
45	2 June 1918	15:40	RAF SE.5a s/n C6468	Pfalz D.III	Driven down out of control	Two miles south of Kemmelberg (Mont Kemmel)	Possibly Leutnant Johann Dunkelberg, from Jasta 58, killed.
46	6 June 1918	15:40	RAF SE.5a s/n C6468	Fokker D.VII	Destroyed	East of Ypres	
47	6 June 1918	19:45	RAF SE.5a s/n C6468	Pfalz D.III	Destroyed	Two miles west of Roeselare (Roulers)| Victory shared with Wilfred Ernest Young, Andrew Kiddie, Harris Clements	
48	9 June 1918	08:05		Albatros C reconnaissance plane	Driven down out of control	South of Mont Kemmel	Victory shared with Andrew Kiddie, Harris Clements
49	9 June 1918	08:10		Albatros reconnaissance plane	Destroyed	South of Mont Kemmel	Victory shared with Wilfred Young
50	16 June 1918	07:45	RAF SE.5a s/n C5845	Pfalz D.III	Destroyed	Three miles south of Zillebeke Lake (Zillebekevijver)	
51	16 June 1918	07:45	RAF SE.5a s/n C5845	Pfalz D.III	Driven down out of control	Three miles south of Zillebeke Lake	
52	17 June 1918	09:45	RAF SE.5a s/n C5845	Hannover reconnaissance plane	Destroyed	Armentières	
53	7 July 1918	20:20	RAF SE.5a s/n E1295	Fokker D.VII	Destroyed	Doulieu	Mannock's first victory as OC of 85 Squadron
54	7 July 1918	20:20	RAF SE.5a s/n E1295	Fokker D.VII	Driven down out of control	Doulieu	
55	14 July 1918	08:35	RAF SE.5a s/n E1295	Fokker D.VII	Destroyed	North of Merville	
56	19 July 1918	08:23	RAF SE.5a s/n E1295	Albatros reconnaissance plane	Destroyed	Merville	Unteroffizier Alfred Hartmann and Leutnant Eberhard von Sydow from FA7, both killed.
57	20 July 1918	11:17	RAF SE.5a s/n E1295	Reconnaissance plane	Destroyed	Northeast of La Bassée	Unteroffizzier Adolf Raths and Leutnant Gross, from FA7, both Killed.
58	20 July 1918	12:15	RAF SE.5a s/n E1295	Fokker D.VII	Driven down out of control	South of Steenwerck	
59	20 July 1918	12:15	RAF SE.5a s/n E1295	Fokker D.VII	Driven down out of control	South of Steenwerck	
60	22 July 1918	09:52	RAF SE.5a s/n E1295	Fokker Triplane	Destroyed	Armentières	Certain to have been Vizefeldwebel Emil Soltau, Jasta 20, killed. The tail was shot off at 11,000 ft.
61	26 July 1918	05:30	RAF SE.5a s/n E1295	LVG Reconnaissance plane	Destroyed	Lestrem	Shared with DC Inglis; Vzfw.Josef Klein/Lt. Ludwig Schopf both killed (FAA292)

== Award citations ==
Military Cross citation:

For conspicuous gallantry and devotion to duty. In the course of many combats he has driven off a large number of enemy machines, and has forced down three balloons, showing a very fine offensive spirit and great fearlessness in attacking the enemy at close range and low altitudes under heavy fire from the ground.

Distinguished Service Order citation:

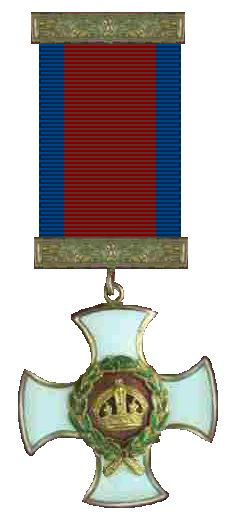
Distinguished Service Order

T./2nd Lt. (T./Capt.) Edward Mannock, M.C., R.E., attd. R.A.F. For conspicuous gallantry and devotion to duty during recent operations. In seven days, while leading patrols and in general engagements, he destroyed seven enemy machines, bringing his total in all to thirty. His leadership, dash and courage were of the highest order.

Distinguished Service Order citation to First Bar:

T./2nd Lt. (T./Capt.) Edward Mannock, D.S.O., R.E., and R.A.F.

For conspicuous gallantry and devotion to duty. In company with one other scout this officer attacked eight enemy aeroplanes, shooting down one in flames. The next day, when leading his flight, he engaged eight enemy aeroplanes, destroying three himself. The same week he led his patrol against six enemy aeroplanes, shooting down the rear machine, which broke in pieces in the air. The following day he shot down an Albatross two-seater in flames, but later, meeting five scouts, had great difficulty in getting back, his machine being much shot about, but he destroyed one. Two days later, he shot down another two-seater in flames. Eight machines in five days—a fine feat of marksmanship and determination to get to close quarters. As a patrol leader he is unequalled.

(D.S.O. gazetted in this Gazette.)

Distinguished Service Order citation to Second Bar:

Air Ministry, 3rd August, 1918.

His Majesty the KING has been graciously pleased to confer the undermentioned rewards on Officers of the Royal Air Force, in recognition of gallantry in flying operations against the enemy:—

Awarded a Second Bar to The Distinguished Service Order.

Lt. (T./Capt.) Edward Mannock, D.S.O., M.C. (formerly Royal Engineers).

This officer has now accounted for 48 enemy machines. His success is due to wonderful shooting and a determination to get to close quarters; to attain this he displays most skilful leadership and unfailing courage. These characteristics were markedly shown on a recent occasion when he attacked six hostile scouts, three of which he brought down. Later on the same day he attacked a two-seater, which crashed into a tree.

(The announcement of award of Distinguished Service Order, and First Bar thereto, will be published in a later Gazette.)

Victoria Cross citation:

"His Majesty the KING has been graciously pleased to approve of the award of the Victoria Cross to the late Captain (acting Major) Edward Mannock, D.S.O., M.C., 85th Squadron Royal Air Force, in recognition of bravery of the first order in Aerial Combat: —

On 17 June 1918, he attacked a Halberstadt machine near Armentieres and destroyed it from a height of 8,000 feet. On 7 July 1918, near Doulieu, he attacked and destroyed one Fokker (red-bodied) machine, which went vertically into the ground from a height of 1,500 feet. Shortly afterwards he ascended 1,000 feet and attacked another Fokker biplane, firing 60 rounds into it, which produced an immediate spin, resulting, it is believed, in a crash. On 14 July 1918, near Merville, he attacked and crashed a Fokker from 7,000 feet, and brought a two-seater down damaged. On 19 July 1918, near Merville, he fired 80 rounds into an Albatross two-seater, which went to the ground in flames. On 20 July 1918, East of La Bassee, he attacked and crashed an enemy two-seater from a height of 10,000 feet.

About an hour afterwards he attacked at 8,000 feet a Fokker biplane near Steenwercke and drove it down out of control, emitting smoke.

On 22 July 1918, near Armentieres, he destroyed an enemy triplane from a height of 10,000 feet.

Major Mannock was awarded the undermentioned distinctions for his previous combats in the air in France and Flanders: —
Military Cross. Gazetted 17 September 1917.
Bar to Military Cross. Gazetted 18 October 1917.
Distinguished Service Order. Gazetted 16 September 1918.
Bar to Distinguished Service Order (1st). Gazetted 16 September 1918.
Bar to Distinguished Service Order (2nd). Gazetted 3 August 1918.

This highly distinguished officer, during the whole of his career in the Royal Air Force, was an outstanding example of fearless courage, remarkable skill, devotion to duty and self-sacrifice, which has never been surpassed.

The total number of machines definitely accounted for by Major Mannock up to the date of his death in France (26 July 1918) is fifty—the total specified in the Gazette of 3 August 1918, was incorrectly given as 48, instead of 41".

Mannock's Victoria Cross was presented to his father at Buckingham Palace in July 1919. Edward Mannock was also given his son's other medals, even though Mick had stipulated in his will that his father should receive nothing from his estate. Soon afterwards, Mannock's medals were sold for £5. They have since been recovered and are now owned by Lord Ashcroft; they are on loan to the Royal Air Force Museum at Hendon. The Memorial Plaque was sold by his niece in September 2014 for £26,400 to a private buyer.
