= No. 40 Squadron RAF =

Defunct flying squadron of the Royal Air Force

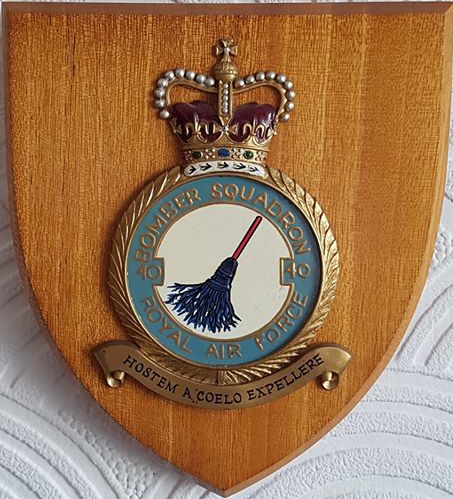
- Active: 26 February 1916 – 4 July 1919; 1 April 1931 – 1 April 1947; 1 December 1947 – 15 March 1950; 28 December 1953 – 1 February 1957
- Country: United Kingdom
- Branch: Royal Air Force
- Mottos: Latin: Hostem acolo expellere ("To drive the enemy from the sky")

Insignia
- Squadron Badge heraldry: A broom. The broom was chosen to immortalise the frequent exhortation of Major 'Mick' Mannock, the famous World War I pilot, who served with the squadron, to "sweep the Huns from the air!"
- Squadron Codes: OX (October 1938 – September 1939); BL (September 1939 – April 1947); LE (June 1949 – March 1950)

No. 40 Squadron of the Royal Air Force was formed in 1916 at Fort Grange, Gosport as No. 40 Squadron Royal Flying Corps and was disbanded for the last time in 1957. The squadron also included many non-British members, including volunteers from the Royal Australian Air Force, South African Air Force, and Royal Canadian Air Force.

== History ==
=== First World War ===
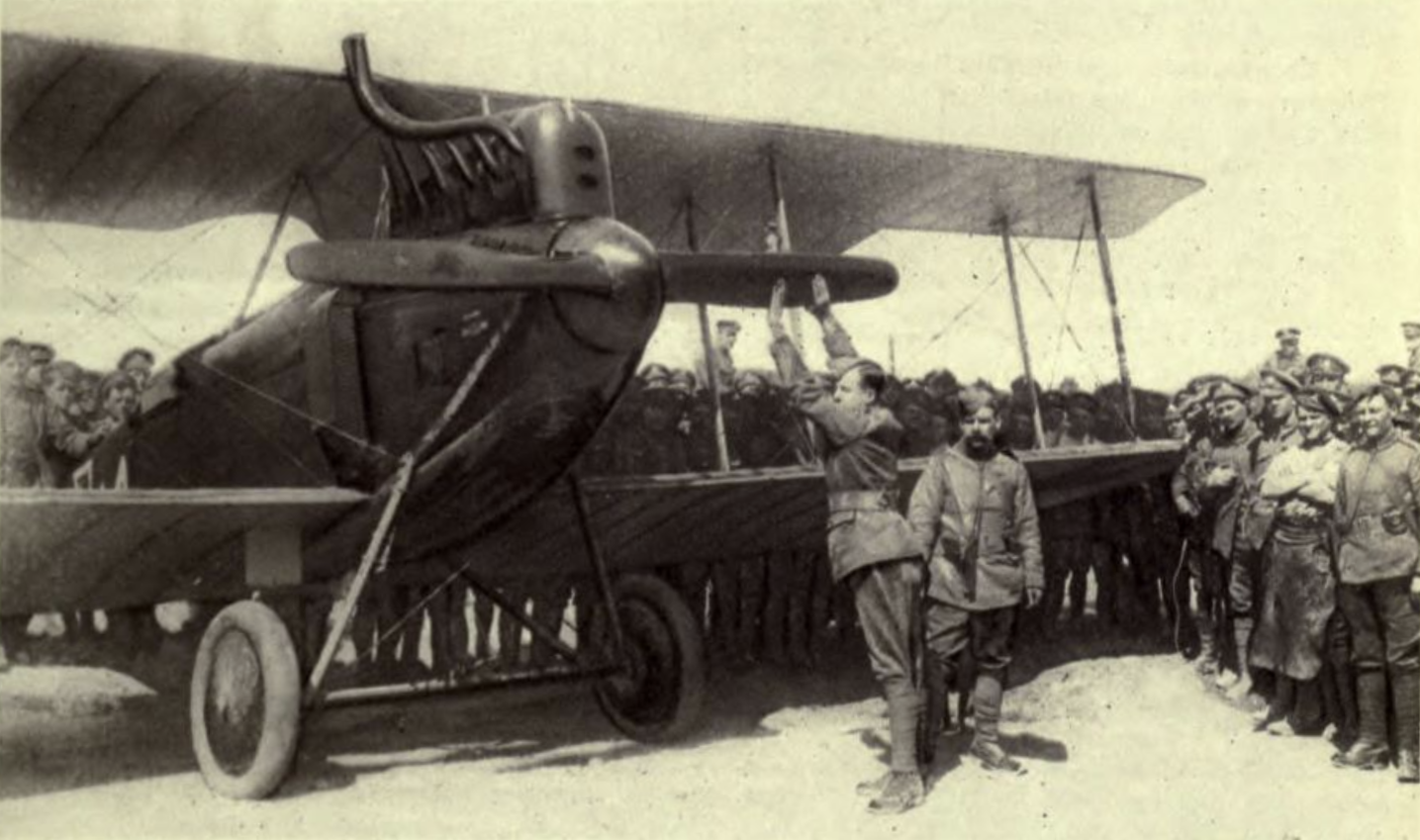
German DFW C.V biplane 5927/16 forced down on 24 Apr 17 near Béthune, France by pilots from 8 Naval Sqdn and 40 Sqdn RFC

40 Squadron Royal Flying Corps was formed on 26 February 1916 at Fort Grange, Gosport, equipped with a mixture of training types. In July that year it received its intended operational mount, the Royal Aircraft Factory F.E.8, a single-seat pusher configuration fighter, being the first squadron equipped with the F.E.8. The squadron moved to France in August that year, but while the F.E.8 had good handling characteristics, it was found to be obsolescent. On 9 March 1917, a patrol of nine 40 Squadron F.E.8s were attacked by a formation of German fighters from Jasta 11, led by Manfred von Richthofen. All nine of the F.E.8s were shot down or forced landed, while one German aircraft, flown by Richthofen was damaged and made a forced landing while a second German pilot was slightly injured. Later that month, the squadron was re-equipped with more capable Nieuport 17s. Despite the F.E.8's obsolescence, the squadron did manage some successes on the type, claiming 16 German aircraft shot down, with one pilot, Edwin Benbow claiming eight confirmed victories when flying the F.E.8 with 40 Squadron.

The better performance of the Nieuport allowed 40 Squadron to be more effective, flying offensive patrols, including attacks on German Observation balloons. From April 1917, as part of the 10th Wing RFC, it flew in support of the British offensive at the Battle of Arras, destroying four balloons (and damaging four more) in a low-level attack on 2 May, and seven more on 7 May. The squadron also flew in support of the Battle of Passchendaele. In October 1917, the squadron re-equipped with Royal Aircraft Factory S.E.5s, operating this type through the rest of the war. The German spring offensive in March 1918 saw the squadron heavily deployed on ground attack missions against the advancing German forces. The squadron became part of the new Royal Air Force on 1 April 1918. It remained active for the remainder of the year, supporting the Hundred Days Offensive.

By the end of the war, the squadron had claimed 130 enemy aircraft and 30 balloons destroyed, with a further 144 aircraft driven down out of control and 10 balloons damaged. Edward Mannock gained 16 of his 61 victories while with 40 Squadron, 15 of which he shot down while flying a Nieuport Scout. Highest scoring ace of the unit in World War I was Irish-born pilot George McElroy, having scored 30 of his total 47 aerial victories with the unit while flying an S.E.5a single seater scout. Others among the two dozen aces who served were Roderic Dallas, Albert Earl Godfrey, Arthur Keen, Reed G. Landis, Ian Napier, William Leeming Harrison, Gwilym Hugh Lewis, Indra Lal Roy, John Henry Tudhope, Edwin Benbow, Herbert Ellis, William Bond, Gerard Crole, Robert Hall, John Wallwork, William MacLanachan and Arthur Thomas Drinkwater.

=== Reformation ===
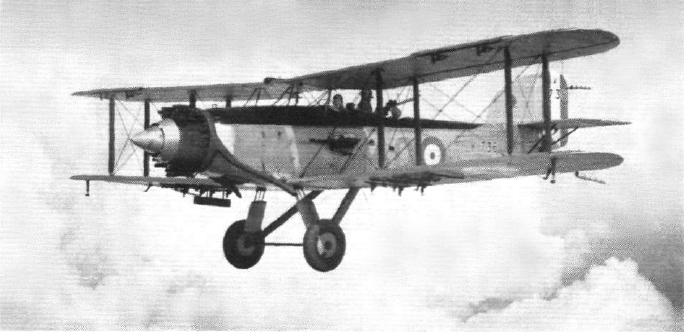
A Fairey Gordon of 40 Squadron

40 Squadron reformed at RAF Upper Heyford on 1 April 1931, as a day bomber squadron equipped with Fairey Gordons, being the first squadron equipped with that type. It moved to RAF Abingdon in October 1932 and in November 1935, re-equipped with the Hawker Hart. On 7 January 1936, one of the squadron's flights was detached to form the basis of 104 Squadron, which became fully independent from 40 Squadron on 1 July that year. In March 1936, the squadron re-equipped with the Hawker Hind, an improved version of the Hart.

On 1 May 1936, No. 1 Group RAF was formed, consisting of ten bomber squadrons, including 40 Squadron, and on 14 July 1936, 1 Group joined the newly established RAF Bomber Command. From July 1938, the squadron replaced its Hind biplanes with Fairey Battle monoplanes, with the last of its Hinds leaving in September that year. After the Munich Agreement in 1938, with the prospect of war with Nazi Germany becoming more likely, plans were made to forward deploy the Battle-equipped squadrons of 1 Group to France as the Advanced Air Striking Force. This was to bring the short-range Battles within range of German industrial targets in the Ruhr, and the aircraft were not intended to operate in direct support of the British or French armies.

=== Second World War ===
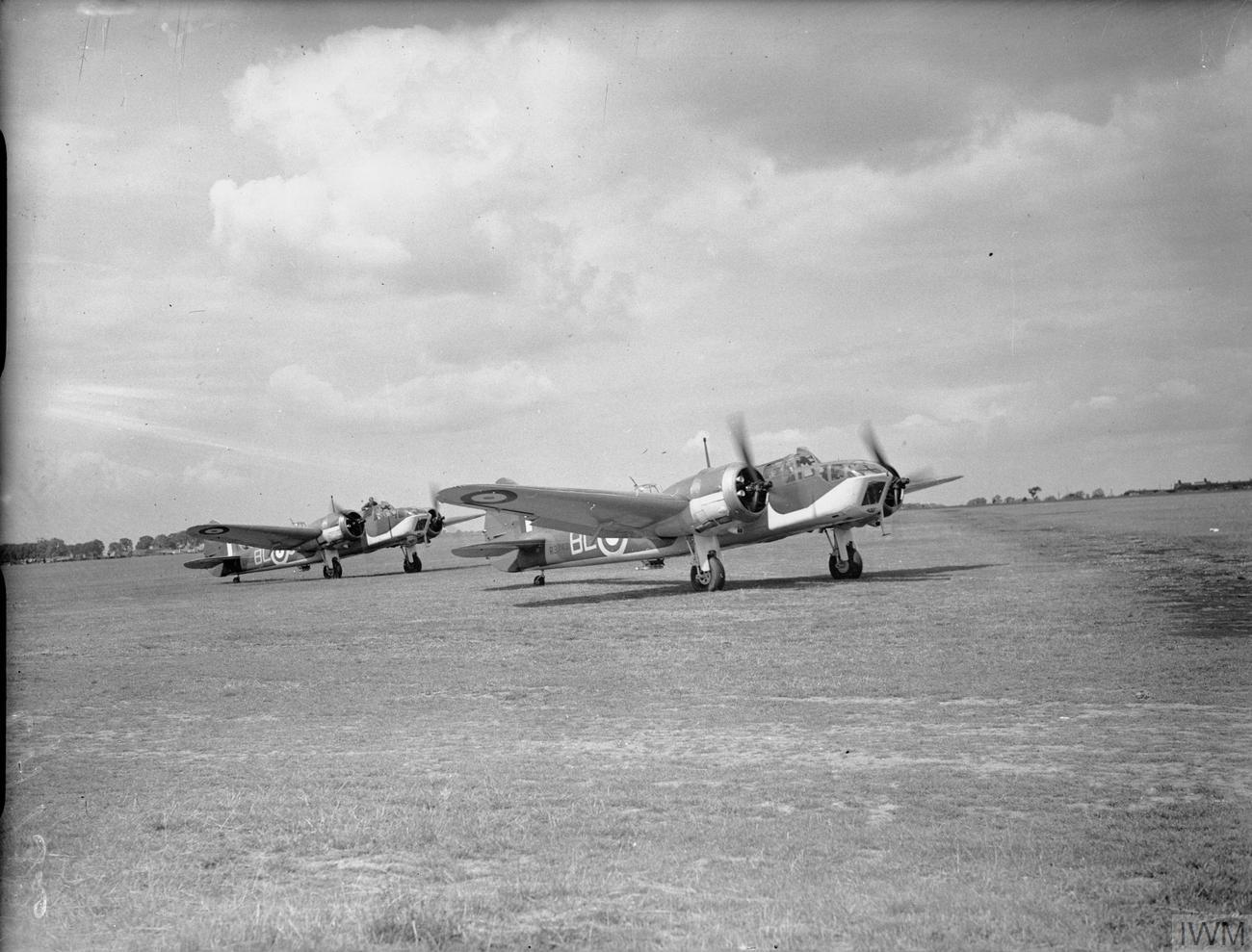
40 Sqdn Blenheims at RAF Wyton

The squadron flew its Battles to Bétheniville, its pre-arranged base in France, on 2 September 1939, the eve of the British declaration of War against Germany. Experience showed that the Battle was obsolete, and the squadrons of the Advanced Air Striking Force were mainly employed on training duties. In December 1939, the squadron was withdrawn from France for re-equipping with twin-engined Bristol Blenheim Mk IV Mk IV light bombers, joining 2 Group on 3 December and based at RAF Wyton. The squadron was non-operational for many weeks after receiving Blenheims, and in February 1940, several of its Blenheims were withdrawn and transferred to Finland during the Winter War. On 14 April 1940 one of the squadron's Blenheims was taken on an unauthorized flight by AC2 JFB Lewis and crashed in the Thames Estuary. His body was not found and he is remembered on the Runnymede Memorial.

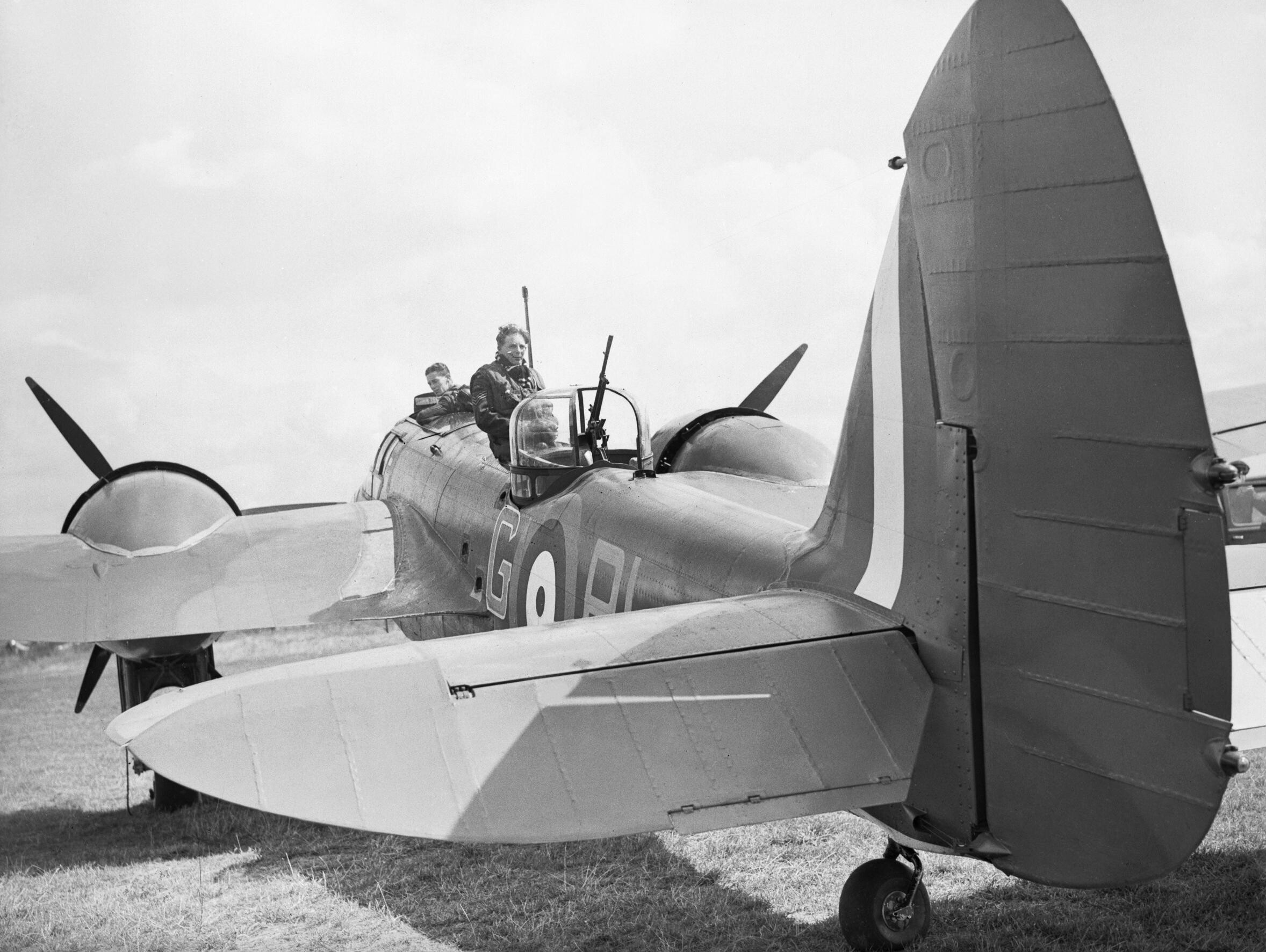
Another view of a 40 Sqdn Blenheim at RAF Wyton

On 10 May 1940, Germany invaded France and the Low Countries, with two of the squadron's Blenheims (one of which was lost) flying a reconnaissance mission over the Hague in the morning, which resulted in a series attacks by squadrons of 2 Group against airfields in the Netherlands being used to land German paratroops, with 40 Squadron attacking Ypenburg Airport in the squadron's first bombing attack of the war. The squadron continued to launch raids against the advancing German forces, which sometimes involved flying from airfields in France. Late in the month, 40 Squadron, along with the rest of 2 Group, was employed in attacks against German forces advancing on the troops of the British Expeditionary Force trapped at Dunkirk. Operations included attacks on enemy motor transport, bridges and attempting to block roads by bombing houses by the sides of the roads. After the fall of France, attacks switched to barges waiting at Channel ports for the planned German invasion of Britain.

'B' Flight of the squadron moved to RAF Alconbury on 8 October 1940. On 1 November 1940, the squadron, along with 15 Squadron, transferred to 3 Group, replacing 37 and 38 Squadrons, which were transferred to the Middle East. As a result, it converted to Vickers Wellingtons to fit with its new role of night bombing against German industrial targets. The squadron carried out its first operations using the Wellington on the night of 21/22 December 1940, when three aircraft attacked Antwerp docks. On 1 February 1941, the remainder of the squadron joined up with 'B' Flight at Alconbury.

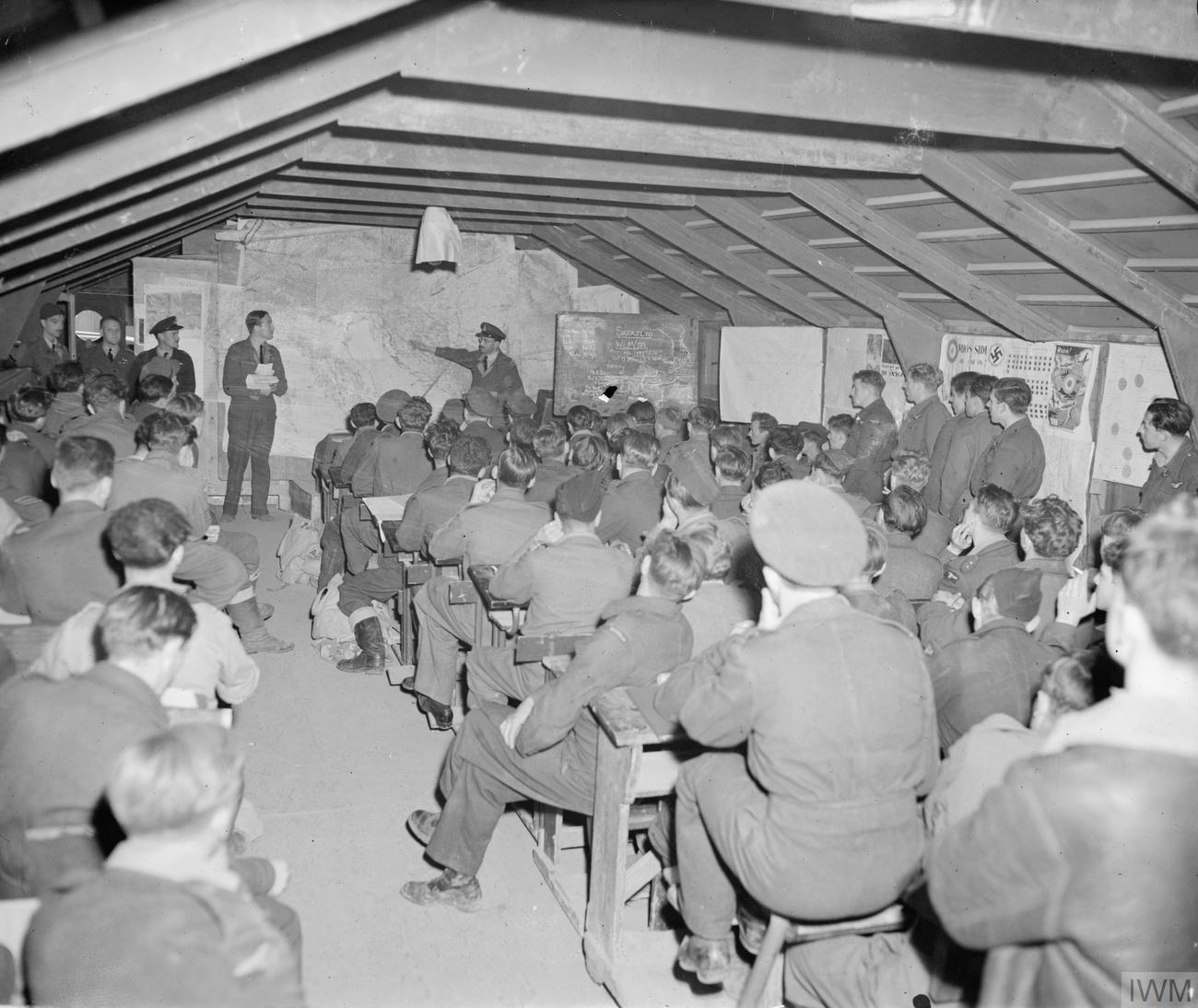
Wellington aircrew of 40 Squadron are briefed at Foggia Main, Italy, before a bombing raid on railway yards at Sarajevo, Yugoslavia

In October 1941, most of the squadron was detached to operate from Malta, with a skeleton remaining at Alconbury. The Malta-based detachment was employed in attacks on Italian airfields, and ports in Sicily and Tripolitania to disrupt supplies to North Africa, as well as nuisance raids by single aircraft, spending hours over the target, forcing the target's anti-aircraft guns to keep firing, denying sleep to workers at the target and damaging enemy morale. Meanwhile, the British-based remnant was gradually rebuilt, although this was disrupted by the posting away of New Zealand and Canadian aircrew to 75 and 419 Squadrons. On 14 February 1942, the Alconbury-based part of the squadron was renumbered No. 156 Squadron RAF, while the Mediterranean-based detachment, which retained the 40 Squadron number, moved to Egypt, spending several months non-operational as it was rebuilt back to full squadron strength after its losses while based at Malta.

During the Second Battle of El Alamein, the British bomber force, including 40 Squadron, attacked the key port of Tobruk as a priority, while also attacking enemy airfields and concentrations of troops and vehicles on the El Alamein battlefield. After the Allied victory in the battle, the squadron was moved westwards to aid attacks on the supply lines of the retreating German and Italian forces. From November 1942 to January 1943, the squadron's aircraft were deployed to Malta, with the role of disrupting Axis supply routes to North Africa during the Anglo-American invasion of French North-West Africa. By the end of February 1943, the squadron was based at Gardabia in Tunisia. While based here it replaced its worn out Wellington Mk Ic aircraft with newer and more capable Wellington Mk IIIs.

On 18 February, 40 Squadron, together with most of the rest of the RAF's night bomber force in the Mediterranean and American day bombers, joined the newly established Northwest African Strategic Air Force. While designated as a Strategic force, the distance to strategic targets from the airfields in North Africa meant that they were at first mainly employed on tactical operations. The squadron flew operations against targets in Sicily during the Allied invasion of that island in July–August 1943. The squadron moved to Southern Italy in December 1943, bringing it closer to its intended targets in Northern Italy and the Balkans, operating from Foggia Main airfield for the rest of the war in Europe. The squadron re-equipped with Consolidated Liberators in March 1945, flying its last mission of the war on the night of 25/26 April 1945, against marshalling yards North West of Salzburg, Austria.

=== Postwar ===
The Squadron returned to Egypt in October 1945, and converted to Avro Lancasters in January 1946, before disbanding on 1 April 1947.

In 1947, the RAF found that its squadrons of Avro York transport aircraft were too large, and as a result a series of smaller units were formed, with 40 Squadron reforming with Yorks at RAF Abingdon on 1 December that year. From June 1948, the Soviet Union blockaded surface transport routes to Berlin, and as a response, the Western Allies launched the Berlin Airlift to resupply the city. The Yorks of 40 Squadron were deployed to RAF Wunstorf in West Germany as a result, with its aircraft and aircrew being operated as part of a pool of RAF Yorks taking part in the airlift. The Yorks were normally used to carry flour or coal. The Soviets lifted the blockade in May 1949, with 40 Squadron withdrawn from the airlift in July 1949, operating from RAF Bassingbourn from its return to Britain until it was disbanded on 15 March 1950.

On 28 October 1953, the squadron reformed as a light bomber squadron equipped with the English Electric Canberra B.2s, one of five Canberra squadrons based at RAF Coningsby as part of the Main Force of Bomber Command. In 1954, the Coningsby Wing was broken up to allow the airfield to be redeveloped to accommodate V-bombers, and as a result, 40 Squadron moved to RAF Wittering in February 1954. The squadron moved to RAF Upwood in November 1956, but on 15 December that year, the squadron merged with 50 Squadron, with the resulting unit being designated 50/40 Squadron on 1 February 1957, this marking the effective disbanding of 40 Squadron for the last time. No. 40 Squadron was later planned to be reformed as the first operational BAC TSR.2 squadron, and after the cancellation of the TSR.2, may have also been proposed to reform with the General Dynamics F-111K, before the RAF's purchase of that type was also cancelled.

== See also ==
- List of Royal Air Force aircraft squadrons
