= George McElroy =

World War I flying ace (1893–1918)

George Edward Henry McElroy
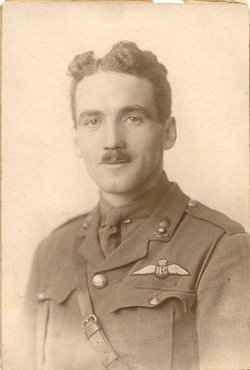
- Born: 14 May 1893; Donnybrook, Dublin, Ireland
- Died: 31 July 1918 (aged 25); Laventie, France
- Burial place: Laventie Military Cemetery, La Gorgue, Nord, France; 50°38′10″N 2°46′25″E
- Military career
- Allegiance: United Kingdom
- Branch: British Army; Royal Flying Corps; Royal Air Force
- Service years: 1914–1918
- Rank: Captain
- Nicknames: "Deadeye" "Mac" "McIrish"
- Units: Royal Engineers; Royal Irish Regiment; Royal Garrison Artillery; No. 40 Squadron RFC/RAF; No. 24 Squadron RFC/RAF
- Awards: Military Cross & Two Bars; Distinguished Flying Cross & Bar

Captain George Edward Henry McElroy MC & Two Bars, DFC & Bar (14 May 1893 – 31 July 1918) was a leading Irish fighter pilot of the Royal Flying Corps and Royal Air Force during World War I. He was credited with 47 aerial victories.

== Military career ==
McElroy was born at Donnybrook, County Dublin, Ireland, to Samuel and Ellen McElroy. He enlisted promptly at the start of World War I in August 1914, and was shipped out to France two months later. He was serving as a corporal in the Motor Cyclist Section of the Royal Engineers when he was first commissioned as a second lieutenant on 9 May 1915.

While serving in the Royal Irish Regiment he was severely affected by mustard gas and was sent home to recuperate. He was in Dublin in April 1916, during the Easter Rising, and was ordered to help quell the insurrection. McElroy refused to fire upon his fellow Irishmen, and was transferred to a southerly garrison away from home.

On 1 June 1916, McElroy relinquished his commission in the Royal Irish Regiment when awarded a cadetship at the Royal Military Academy, Woolwich, from which he graduated on 28 February 1917, and was commissioned as a second lieutenant in the Royal Garrison Artillery.

=== Aerial service ===
McElroy was promptly seconded to the Royal Flying Corps, being trained as a pilot at the Central Flying School at Upavon, and appointed a flying officer on 28 June. On 27 July his commission was backdated to 9 February 1916, and he was promoted to lieutenant on 9 August. On 15 August he joined No. 40 Squadron RFC, where he benefited from mentoring by Edward Mannock. He originally flew a Nieuport 17, but with no success in battle. By the year's end McElroy was flying S.E.5s and claimed his first victory on 28 December.

An extremely aggressive dog-fighter who ignored often overwhelming odds, McElroy's score soon grew rapidly. He shot down two German aircraft in January 1918, and by 18 February had run his string up to 11. At that point, he was appointed a flight commander with the temporary rank of captain, and transferred to No. 24 Squadron RFC. He continued to steadily accrue victories by ones and twos. By 26 March, when he was awarded the Military Cross, he was up to 18 "kills".

On 1 April, the Army's Royal Flying Corps (RFC) and the Royal Naval Air Service (RNAS) were merged to form the Royal Air Force, and his squadron became No. 24 Squadron RAF. McElroy was injured in an accident on 7 April; he brushed a treetop while landing. By then he had run his score to 27. While he was sidelined with his injury, on 22 April, he was awarded a bar to his Military Cross. Following his convalescence, McElroy returned to No. 40 Squadron in June, scoring three times, on the 26th, 28th, and 30th. The latter two triumphs were observation balloons. That ran his tally to 30.

In July, he added to his score almost daily, a third balloon busting on the 1st, followed by one of the most triumphant months in the history of fighter aviation, adding 17 victims during the month. His run of success was threatened on the 20th by a vibrating engine that entailed breaking off an attack on a German two seater and a rough emergency landing that left him with scratches and bruises.

There was a farewell luncheon that day for his friend "Noisy" Lewis; their mutual friend "Mick" Mannock pulled McElroy aside to warn him about the hazards of following a German victim down within range of ground fire.

On 26 July, his mentor and friend, Edward "Mick" Mannock, was killed by ground fire. Ironically, on that same day, "McIrish" McElroy received the second Bar to his Military Cross. He was one of only ten airmen to receive the second Bar.

=== Death in action ===
McElroy's continued apparent disregard for his own safety when flying and fighting could have only one end. On 31 July 1918, he reported destroying a Hannover C for his 47th victory. He then set out again. He failed to return from this flight and was posted missing. Later it was learned that McElroy had been killed by ground fire. He was 25 years old.

McElroy would receive the Distinguished Flying Cross posthumously on 3 August, citing his shooting down 35 aeroplanes and three observation balloons. The Bar would arrive later, on 21 September, and would laud his low-level attacks. In summary, he shot down four enemy aircraft in flames and destroyed 23 others, one of which he shared destroyed with other pilots. He drove down 16 enemy aircraft "out of control" and out of the fight; in one of those cases, it was a shared success. He also destroyed three balloons.

McElroy is interred in Plot I.C.1 at the Laventie Military Cemetery in La Gorgue, northern France.

== Awards and citations ==
Military Cross
2nd Lieutenant George Edward Henry McElroy, Royal Garrison Artillery and Royal Flying Corps.

"For conspicuous gallantry and devotion to duty. He has shown a splendid offensive spirit in dealing with enemy aircraft. He has destroyed at least two enemy machines, and has always set a magnificent example of courage and initiative." (Gazetted 26 March 1918.)

Bar to Military Cross
2nd Lieutenant George Edward Henry McElroy, MC, Royal Garrison Artillery and Royal Flying Corps.

"For conspicuous gallantry and devotion to duty. When on an offensive patrol, observing a hostile scout diving on one of our aeroplanes, he opened fire, and sent down the enemy machine in an irregular spin out of control, when it finally crashed completely. Later in the same day, he sent down another enemy machine in flames. On another occasion, when on offensive patrol, he singled one out of four enemy machines, and sent it down crashing to earth. On the same day he attacked another enemy machine, and, after firing 200 rounds, it burst into flames. On a later occasion, he opened fire on an enemy scout at 400 yards range, and finally sent it down in a slow spin out of control. In addition, this officer has brought down two other enemy machines completely out of control, his skill and determination being most praiseworthy." (Gazetted 2 April 1918.)

Second bar to Military Cross

Lieutenant (Temporary Captain) George Edward Henry McElroy, MC, Royal Garrison Artillery and Royal Flying Corps.
"For conspicuous gallantry and devotion to duty. While flying at a height of 2,000 feet, he observed a patrol of five enemy aircraft patrolling behind the lines. After climbing into the clouds, he dived to the attack, shot down and crashed one of them. Later, observing a two-seater, he engaged and shot it down out of control. On another occasion he shot down an enemy scout which was attacking our positions with machine-gun fire. He has carried out most enterprising work in attacking enemy troops and transport and in the course of a month has shot down six enemy aircraft, which were seen to crash, and five others out of control." (Gazetted 26 July 1918.)

Distinguished Flying Cross
Lieutenant (Temporary Captain) George Edward Henry McElroy, MC.

"A brilliant fighting pilot who has destroyed thirty-five machines and three kite balloons to date. He has led many offensive patrols with marked success, never hesitating to engage the enemy regardless of their being, on many occasions, in superior numbers. Under his dashing and skilful leadership his flight has largely contributed to the excellent record obtained by the squadron." (Gazetted 3 August 1918.)

Bar to Distinguished Flying Cross
Lieutenant (Temporary Captain) George Edward Henry McElroy, MC, DFC. (Royal Garrison Artillery).

"In the recent battles on various army fronts this officer has carried out numerous patrols, and flying at low altitudes, has inflicted heavy casualties on massed enemy troops, transport, artillery teams, etc., both with machine-gun fire and bombs. He has destroyed three enemy kite balloons and forty-three machines, accounting for eight of the latter in eight consecutive days. His brilliant achievements, keenness and dash have at all times set a fine example and inspired all who came in contact with him." (Gazetted 20 September 1918.)

== List of aerial victories ==
Combat record
No.	Date/Time	Aircraft/ (Serial No.)	Foe	Result	Location	Notes
No. 40 Squadron RFC
1	28 December 1917 @1120	S.E.5a (B598)	LVG C	Destroyed	Drocourt, Pas-de-Calais—Vitry	
2	13 January 1918 @0920	S.E.5a (B598)	Rumpler C	Out of control	Pont-à-Vendin	
3	19 January 1918 @1205	S.E.5a (B598)	DFW C	Destroyed	Vitry	
4	24 January 1918 @1250	S.E.5a (B598)	DFW C	Out of control	Oppy—Henin-Liétard	
5	2 February 1918 @1330	S.E.5a (B598)	C	Out of control	South-east of Habourdin	
6	5 February 1918 @1240	S.E.5a (B22)	DFW C	Destroyed	Wingles	
7	5 February 1918 @1300	S.E.5a (B22)	DFW C	Destroyed (on fire)	North of La Bassée	
8	16 February 1918 @1130	S.E.5a (B598)	DFW C	Out of control	West of Henin-Liétard	
9	17 February 1918 @1125	S.E.5a (B22)	Pfalz D.III	Destroyed	Marquain	
10	17 February 1918 @1155	S.E.5a (B22)	C	Destroyed (on fire)	4 miles south-east of Lens	
11	18 February 1918 @1200	S.E.5a (B598)	Albatros D.V	Out of control	Douvrin	
No. 24 Squadron RFC
12	21 February 1918 @1000	S.E.5a (B664)	Albatros D.V	Out of control	South of Honnecourt	
13	26 February 1918 @1605	S.E.5a (B891)	Fokker Dr.I	Destroyed (on fire)	4 miles east of Laon	
14	1 March 1918 @1045	S.E.5a (B891)	DFW C	Out of control	Beaurevoir	
15	6 March 1918 @0705	S.E.5a (C1751)	Albatros D.V	Destroyed	North-east of Bullecourt	
16	8 March 1918 @0755	S.E.5a (B891)	DFW C	Out of control	East of St. Quentin	
17	8 March 1918 @1455	S.E.5a (B891)	Fokker Dr.I	Destroyed	South-east of La Fère	
18	9 March 1918 @0930	S.E.5a (B891)	Albatros D.V	Out of control	North-east of La Fère	
19	27 March 1918 @1520	S.E.5a (A8900)	Albatros D.V	Destroyed (on fire)	Chipilly	
20	29 March 1918 @1530	S.E.5a (C1800)	Albatros D.V	Destroyed	Foucaucourt	
21	29 March 1918 @1545	S.E.5a (C1800)	DFW C	Out of control	East of Warfusée	
No. 24 Squadron RAF
22	1 April 1918 @1215	S.E.5a (C1084)	Albatros D.V	Destroyed	North of Ignaucourt	
23	2 April 1918 @1430	S.E.5a (C1084)	Albatros D.V	Out of control	East of Moreuil	
24	4 April 1918 @1505	S.E.5a (C1084)	Pfalz D.III	Destroyed	North of Warfusée	
25	7 April 1918 @1040	S.E.5a (C1800)	Albatros D.V	Out of control	Warfusée	
26	7 April 1918 @1100	S.E.5a (C1800)	Albatros D.V	Destroyed	3 miles east of Marcelcave	
27	7 April 1918 @1115	S.E.5a (C1800)	Fokker Dr.I	Out of control	North of Moreuil Wood	
No. 40 Squadron RAF
28	26 June 1918 @0655	S.E.5a (C8869)	DFW C	Destroyed	500 yards south-east of Annay	
29	28 June 1918 @1255	S.E.5a (C8869)	Balloon	Destroyed	Provin	
30	30 June 1918 @1045	S.E.5a (C8869)	Balloon	Destroyed	Annay	Shared with Lieutenants A. R. Whitten and Gilbert Strange
31	1 July 1918 @1225	S.E.5a (C8869)	Balloon	Destroyed	Harnes	
32	2 July 1918 @1022	S.E.5a (D6122)	DFW C	Destroyed	North of La Bassée	
33	2 July 1918 @2100	S.E.5a (E1318)	DFW C	Destroyed	North-west of Pacaut Wood	
34	5 July 1918 @1150	S.E.5a (C8869)	DFW C	Out of control	Lestrem	
35	6 July 1918 @0540	S.E.5a (C8869)	Hannover C	Destroyed	North-east of Arras	
36	8 July 1918 @0925	S.E.5a (C8869)	Hannover C	Out of control	East of Monchy	Shared with Lieutenants Indra Lal Roy and Gilbert Strange
37	8 July 1918 @1045	S.E.5a (C8869)	Hannover C	Destroyed	3 miles east of La Bassée	
38	11 July 1918 @0550	S.E.5a (C8869)	Hannover C	Destroyed	West of Vitry	
39	13 July 1918 @0645	S.E.5a (C8869)	Hannover C	Destroyed	West of Estaires	Shared with Lieutenants F. H. Knobel, Indra Lal Roy and Gilbert Strange
40	13 July 1918 @2005	S.E.5a (C8869)	Pfalz D.III	Destroyed	Vitry	
41	14 July 1918 @0730	S.E.5a (C8869)	Hannover C	Destroyed	North of Drocourt	
42	15 July 1918 @2015	S.E.5a (C8869)	Fokker D.VII	Destroyed	North-east of Hill 70, Lens	
43	15 July 1918 @2015	S.E.5a (C8869)	Fokker D.VII	Out of control	North-east of Hill 70, Lens	
44	19 July 1918 @1245	S.E.5a (C8869)	Albatros D.V	Destroyed	2 miles North of Estaires	
45	25 July 1918 @0615	S.E.5a (C8869)	Hannover C	Destroyed	North of Neuve-Chapelle	
46	25 July 1918 @0715	S.E.5a (C8869)	Hannover C	Destroyed	West of Bois d'Épinoy	
47	31 July 1918 @0930	S.E.5a (E1310)	Hannover C	Destroyed	Laventie	

== Bibliography ==
- Franks, Norman (2007). SE 5/5a Aces of World War I. London, UK: Osprey Publishing. ISBN 978-1-84603-180-9.
- Shores, Christopher & Rolfe, Mark (2001). British and Empire Aces of World War I. Osprey Publishing. ISBN 978-1-84176-377-4.
- Shores, Christopher F.; Franks, Norman & Guest, Russell F. (1990). Above the Trenches: a Complete Record of the Fighter Aces and Units of the British Empire Air Forces 1915–1920. London, UK: Grub Street. ISBN 978-0-948817-19-9.
