= Hans-Joachim Buddecke =

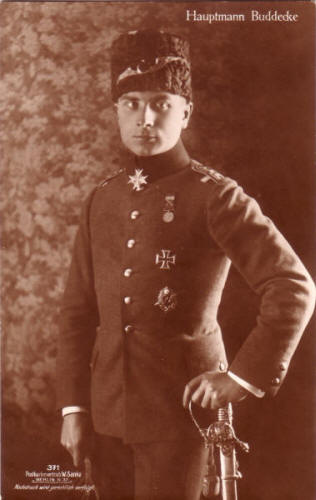
- Hans-Joachim Buddecke, in Turkish uniform, with the Pour le Mérite at his neck
- Born: 22 August 1890; Berlin, Kingdom of Prussia, German Empire
- Died: 10 March 1918 (aged 27) near Lille, France
- Military career
- Allegiance: German Empire
- Branch: Infantry, Luftstreitkräfte
- Service years: 1904-1910, 1914-1918
- Rank: Hauptmann
- Units: FFA 23; Flieger-Abteilung 6; Jagdstaffel 4; Jagdstaffel 30; Jagdstaffel 18
- Awards: PrussianPour le Mérite; Iron Cross 1st & 2nd Class; Saxon Military Order of Saint Henry; Turkish Golden Liakat Medal and Gold and Silver award of the Imtiaz Medal

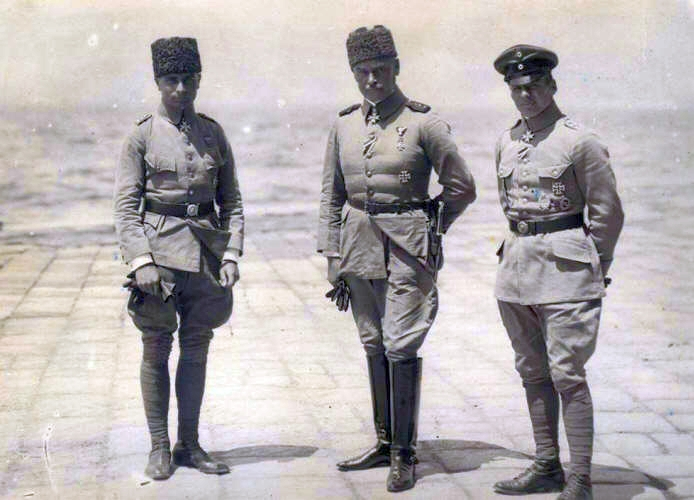
Hans-Joachim Buddecke, Otto Liman von Sanders and Oswald Boelcke in Turkey, 1916

Hans-Joachim Buddecke (22 August 1890 – 10 March 1918) was a German flying ace in World War I, credited with thirteen victories. He was the third ace, after Max Immelmann and Oswald Boelcke, to earn the Blue Max (Pour le Mérite). He saw combat in three theaters during the First World War: Bulgaria, Turkey, and the Western Front. His exploits at Gallipoli arena won him the nickname El-Schahin, "hunter falcon".

== Background ==
Buddecke was born in Berlin and followed his father's footsteps into the Army. In 1904, he started as a Cadet; in 1910, he received his commission as Leutnant in the 115th Life Guards Infantry Regiment. He left the army in 1913 due to his little time for a social life and his new enthusiasm for flying. In the same year, he moved to the United States to start a new life, and flew for a time from the early aerodrome in Cicero, Illinois, a suburb of Chicago. While in the US, he worked beside one of his uncles as a mechanic at a car factory in Indianapolis. By saving his earnings, on 20 May 1914 he was able to buy his own aircraft (a Nieuport monoplane) and he immediately taught himself how to fly. On the day Buddecke started his own aircraft production company, war was declared and he abandoned his business plans and returned to Germany, with the American-built Nieuport monoplane he had purchased at the Cicero aerodrome. Travelling under a fake name, Buddecke crossed the Atlantic in the Greek ship Athene to Palermo (Italy). After he arrived in Europe, he immediately made his way home to join the German Army's Fliegertruppe air service.

== Involvement in World War 1 ==
Buddecke was sent to the Western Front in September 1914. Initially he flew as an observer but soon he would become a single-seater fighter pilot with FFA 23. Because of his previous experience on monoplanes, Buddecke's good friend, Rudolph Berthold, suggested that he should fly the first of the Fokker Eindecker aircraft delivered to the unit. Buddecke and Berthold, flying the Eindecker and an AEG G.II, respectively, formed a small Kampfstaffel within the unit, intercepting British reconnaissance aircraft. Buddecke scored his first three victories during this assignment.

Buddecke scored his and the new unit's first victory on 19 September 1915; a B.E.2c of No 8 Squadron RFC, crewed by pilot Lt WH Nixon and observer Capt JNS Stott. Opening fire from 200 meters he disabled the observer's machine gun, although Captain Stott then returned fire with a pocket pistol. It was shot out of his hands at a range of ten meters and Nixon was hit. Buddecke's gun then jammed when its cartridge belt tore in the slipstream. As Buddecke struggled with the jammed gun, Stott clambered atop the shoulders of his dying pilot, set his heels on the pilot's knees to operate the rudder and bent forward to grab the controls. Buddecke cleared his gun and aimed at the British observer's yellow leather coat. The BE.2c crash landed near Saint-Quentin. Buddecke drove to the wreck after landing, where the uninjured captive Stott showed him the bullet holes in his coat. Buddecke followed this up with confirmed claims on 23 October (a B.E.2 of No. 13 Squadron RFC, with Capt. CH Marks and Lt. WG Lawrence, the brother of TE Lawrence of Arabia. Both were killed) and 11 November and an unconfirmed victory on 6 December 1915.

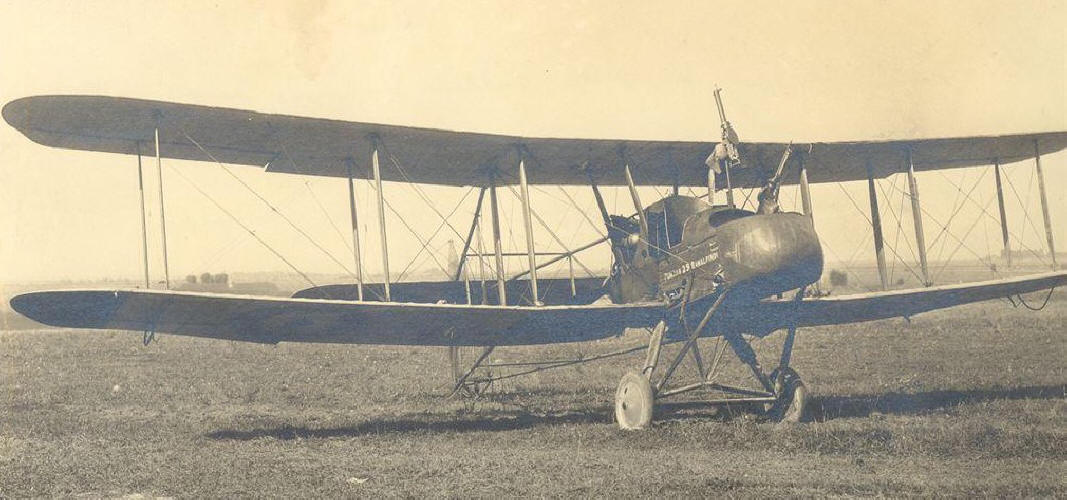
On 6 September 1916, Buddecke forced down this FE2b and captured it for his eighth victory.

He was then sent to Gallipoli to fly the Halberstadt D.II and Fokker E.III with Ottoman FA 6 against the Royal Naval Air Service. The Turkish campaign was successful, with four confirmed victories and seven unconfirmed, and Buddecke was personally awarded the Gold Liakat Medal by Enver Pasha. He was recalled to the Western Front in late August 1916 as leader of the newly formed Royal Prussian Jagdstaffel 4. After three kills during September, he again left for Turkey to fly with Ottoman FA 5. By early 1918 he was back in France with Royal Prussian Jasta 30, before switching to Royal Prussian Jagdstaffel 18.

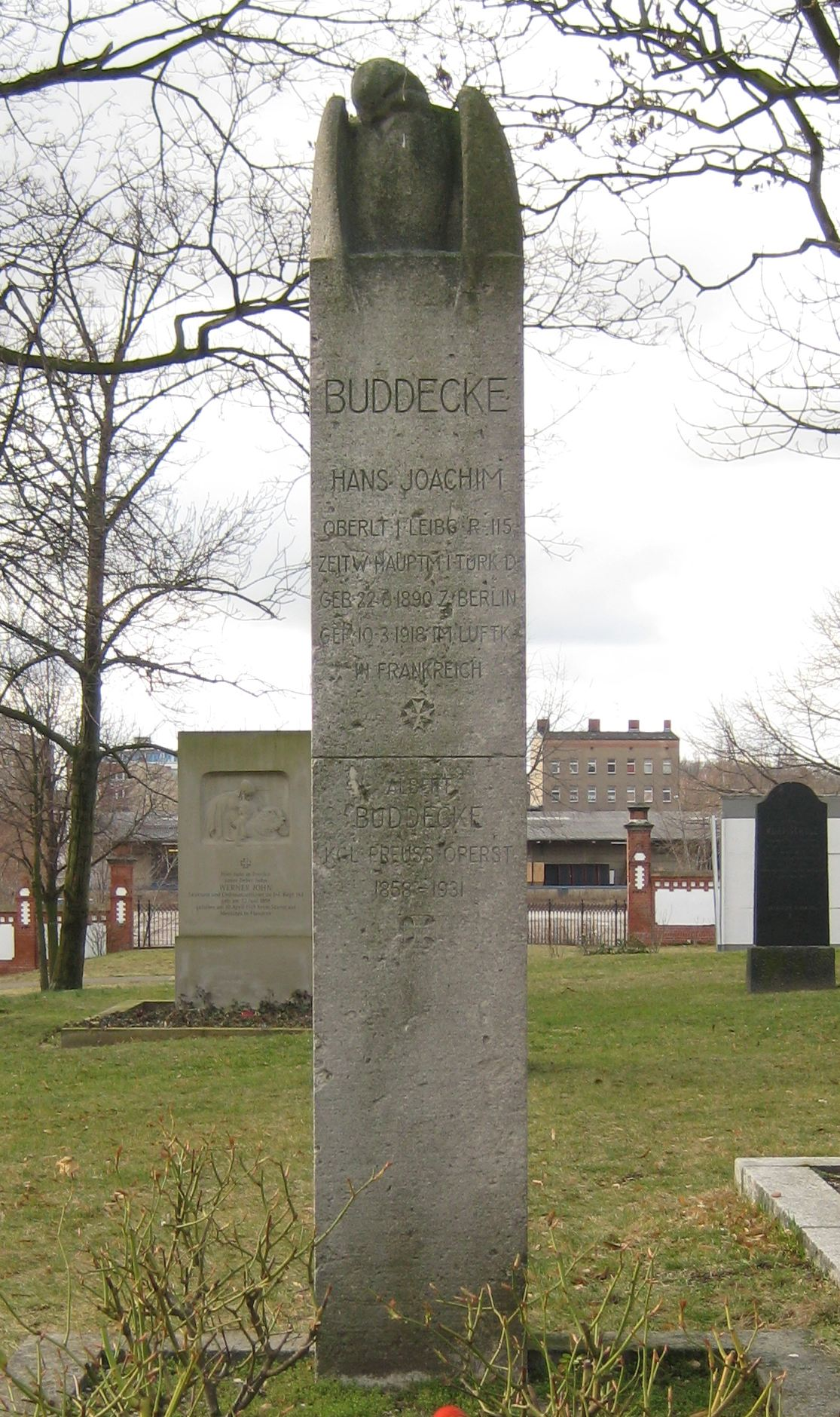
Grave of Hans Joachim Buddecke (1918) on the Invalidenfriedhof Berlin

Within a few days Buddecke was killed during an aerial combat above Lens, France on 10 March 1918, victim to Sopwith Camels of 3 Naval Squadron RNAS. Hans-Joachim Buddecke is buried at the Invalidenfriedhof Cemetery in Berlin.

== Decorations and awards ==
- Iron Cross of 1914, 1st and 2nd class (1915)
- Knight's Cross of the Royal House Order of Hohenzollern with Swords
- Knight's Cross of the Military Order of St. Henry
- Gold Liakat Medal (1916)
- Pour le Mérite (14 April 1916)
- Imtiaz Medal
