= Thomas Stevenson (disambiguation) =

Thomas Stevenson (1818–1887) was a Scottish civil engineer and lighthouse designer

Thomas or Tom Stevenson may also refer to:

- Thomas Stevenson (toxicologist) (1838–1908), English chemist
- Thomas Stevenson (cricketer) (1804–1845), English cricketer
- Thomas Stevenson (rugby union), Irish international rugby union player
- Thomas G. Stevenson (1836–1864), general in the Union Army during the American Civil War
- Thomas L. Stevenson, Pennsylvania politician
- Tom Stevenson (born 1951), British wine writer
- T. H. C. Stevenson (Thomas Henry Craig Stevenson, 1870–1932), Northern Irish statistician

== See also ==
- Thomas Stephenson (disambiguation)
