= Gwilym Hugh Lewis =

British flying ace (1897–1996)

- Born: 5 August 1897; Moseley, Birmingham, England
- Died: 18 December 1996 (aged 99)
- Military career
- Allegiance: United Kingdom
- Branch: British Army; Royal Air Force
- Service years: 1915–1919; 1939–1944
- Rank: Wing Commander
- Nickname: "Noisy"
- Units: No. 32 Squadron RFC; No. 40 Squadron RAF
- Awards: Distinguished Flying Cross
- Other work: Became insurance broker.

Wing Commander Gwilym Hugh Lewis DFC (5 August 1897 – 18 December 1996) was a British flying ace during World War I. He was credited with 12 confirmed aerial victories. He went on to a very successful career as an insurance broker. Lewis was the next to last surviving British ace from the war, as well as the longest lived, dying eight months before his hundredth birthday. His wide range of friends included Prime Minister Winston Churchill, playwright Noël Coward, and fellow aces Stan Dallas, Mick Mannock, and George McElroy.

== Early life and service ==
Born in Moseley, Birmingham, in 1897 to Mr. and Mrs. Hugh Lewis, he was educated at Marlborough College. He volunteered for the Northamptonshire Regiment for service early in World War I. On 10 September 1915, having trained at the Officers' Training Corps at the University of London, he was commissioned as a second lieutenant; however, he was not entitled to pay and allowances until the following 3 January. His first try at transferring to the Royal Flying Corps was refused because they had no openings. Lewis then procured £100 from his father for tuition, and put himself through private pilot's training at Hendon on a Grahame-White Boxkite. Lewis was awarded Aviators' Certificate No. 2116 on 27 November 1915. The RFC then accepted him and sent him to the Central Flying School at Upavon.

== World War I aerial service ==
On 24 March 1916, Lewis was seconded to the First Garrison Battalion of the Royal West Kent Regiment. On 23 April 1916, he was appointed a flying officer. He would be one of the founding members of No. 32 Squadron RFC.

When 32 Squadron moved to France on 29 May 1916, Lewis flew a tired Airco DH.2 over the English Channel; he had four and a half hours solo flight experience. On 15 July he would help destroy a Fokker Eindekker for his first aerial victory. Two months later, on 22 September, he destroyed a Roland C.II over Bancourt for his first singlehanded victory.

Lewis was appointed a flight commander with the temporary rank of captain on 27 August 1917. He would not score again until late 1917, when he was assigned to 40 Squadron to train as a flight commander on Royal Aircraft Factory SE.5s. He began his training duties in September 1917. On 19 December 1917, he drove an Albatros D.III down out of control. He would drive another down a month later, on 19 January 1918. He would score nine more times in the next six months, including one triumph shared with his squadron leader, Major Stan Dallas. Lewis ran his personal tally to five German planes destroyed, six driven down out of control, as well as capturing an LVG reconnaissance plane on 7 July 1918 for his final win. He was awarded a Distinguished Flying Cross during July.

Stan Dallas was not the only famous ace Lewis befriended; Mick Mannock invoked the rule of opposites to nickname the quiet Lewis as "Noisy". On Lewis's final day in France, at his farewell luncheon, Mannock pulled aside top Irish ace George McElroy to caution him about following victims down to within the range of German ground fire. Six days later, Mannock was killed in action by ground fire when he followed a falling German plane too close to earth; McElroy followed him five days later. Lewis had earlier lost his elder brother in aerial combat. Lewis returned to instructor duty in England to finish out the war. He was transferred to the unemployed list of the RAF on 21 January 1919.

== Post World War I ==
Lewis came home from the war to share a cottage in Wargrave with some of his service friends; they were Noël Coward's audience for his reading of his first play, The Rat Trap. Lewis began his career in insurance with Sedgwick and Collins, brokers with Lloyd's of London. During 1919 and 1920, despite his resignation from flying, Lewis began writing about aviation safety while he began his career as an insurance broker. He also wrote Wings Over the Somme 1916–1918, his memoir of his war experiences. At some point during this time, Lewis also served as the Recorder of Chesterfield.

Lewis eventually relinquished his commission as a lieutenant in the 4th Battalion, Northamptonshire Regiment, on 30 September 1921. He traveled to the United States in 1923, surveying business conditions there. Upon his return, he recommended that Lloyd's form an American Non-Marine Department; the recommendation caused some hard feelings towards him from coworkers. Lewis was listed in public records as a business liquidator as early as 1925. This was also the year he married Christian Robertson, on 9 July; the union would last 68 years and produce two daughters and two sons. Lewis avoided becoming impoverished by the Great Depression of 1929. He also built the American Non-Marine Department into the largest department in Sedgwick and Collins by 1939.

== World War II service ==
Lewis was commissioned as a probationary pilot officer in the Administrative and Special Duties Branch of the Royal Air Force Volunteer Reserve on 7 March 1939, and was confirmed in his rank and promoted to flying officer on 14 August, only two weeks before the declaration of war. He served as a member of the Cabinet War Rooms reporting to and briefing Winston Churchill until his health once again forced his resignation on 21 September 1944, this time from the rank of wing commander. In the meantime, he had attempted to remain current with business affairs at Sedgwick, Collins.

== Post World War II ==
Lewis parted with Sedgwick, Collins in 1947. He went to work for Arbon Langrish, and succeeded to its chairmanship upon death of its senior partner. Once again, Lewis went offshore to build up American accounts for his firm. As late as November 1960, Lewis was still active as liquidator on an insurance brokerage that month, with his address being given in London. Lewis sold out Arbon Langrish to Clarkeson in 1965.

Lewis appeared as a contributor in the 1987 documentary 'The Cavalry of the Clouds', produced by British regional commercial television station 'HTV West'.

When Gwilym Hugh Lewis died on 18 December 1996, aged 99. He was Lloyd's of London's oldest member, as well as the oldest of the two World War I British aces remaining. The other ace, his near namesake Cecil Lewis, was a year younger and died a month later.

== Honours and awards ==
Distinguished Flying Cross
Lieutenant (Temporary Captain) Gwilym Hugh Lewis (Northamptonshire Regiment).

"It is largely due to this officer's ability and judgment as a flight leader that many enemy machines have been destroyed with very few casualties in his formation. He is bold in attack, and has personally accounted for eight enemy aircraft, displaying marked disregard of personal danger."

== Bibliography ==
- Franks, Norman (2007). SE 5/5a Aces of World War I: Volume 78 of Aircraft of the Aces. London, UK: Osprey Publishing. ISBN 978-1-84603-180-9.
- Shores, Christopher; Franks, Norman; Guest, Russell (1990). Above the Trenches: A Complete Record of the Fighter Aces and Units of the British Empire Air Forces, 1915–1920. London: Grub Street. ISBN 0-948817-19-4.
