= Thomas Frederick Stephenson =

British World War I flying ace

- Born: 1894; Eastfield, Peterborough, England
- Died: 20 November 1917 (aged 22–23); Cambrai, France
- Burial place: Arras Flying Services Memorial, Pas de Calais, France
- Military career
- Allegiance: United Kingdom
- Branch: British Army
- Service years: 1913–1917
- Rank: Sergeant
- Unit: No. 11 Squadron RFC
- Conflicts: World War I • Western Front
- Awards: Distinguished Conduct Medal

Sergeant Thomas Frederick Stephenson DCM (1894 – 20 November 1917) was a British World War I flying ace credited with five aerial victories.

== Military service ==
He was born in Eastfield, Peterborough, the son of George Frederick Stephenson and his wife Annie Georgina. He joined the Royal Flying Corps on 7 July 1913, and was sent to France on 12 August 1914.

By 1917 Stephenson was a sergeant pilot in No. 11 Squadron RFC. He was teamed with Air Mechanic 1st Class Sydney Platel as his observer/gunner in a Bristol F.2 Fighter. The duo garnered five victories together between 23 September and 31 October 1917, all against Albatros D.Vs. After destroying two enemy aircraft on 31 October, they in turn fell under the guns of Oberleutnant Hans Bethge. They survived this, though Platel lost a toe.

On 20 November 1917, the first day of the Battle of Cambrai, Stephenson and his observer Lieutenant William Morse set off on a reconnaissance mission over the German lines, but their aircraft was shot down, apparently a victim of ground fire. Stephenson was listed as missing, presumed killed, but Morse survived, although wounded, and was captured.

On 4 March 1918 he was posthumously awarded the Distinguished Conduct Medal. His citation read:

769 Sjt. T. F. Stephenson, RFC.

"For conspicuous gallantry and devotion to duty. While flying over the enemy's lines he was attacked by twelve hostile scouts and engaged four of them, one of which he destroyed. He was then attacked by another of the enemy machines, and, though his observer had been wounded, he succeeded in destroying it. His machine was then rendered almost uncontrollable by a shell, the right wing being almost shot off, but he succeeded in landing it in our front-line wire. He has destroyed five hostile machines and shown splendid courage and determination."

As an air casualty of the Western Front with no known grave, he is commemorated at the Arras Flying Services Memorial, and also on the Peterborough War Memorial.

== List of aerial victories ==
Combat record
No.	Date/Time	Aircraft/ Serial No.	Opponent	Result	Location
1	23 September 1917 @ 1625	Bristol Fighter (A7209)	Albatros D.V	Out of control	Vitry
2	20 October 1917 @ 1640	Bristol Fighter	Albatros D.V	Out of control	North-west of Cambrai
3	20 October 1917 @ 1640	Bristol Fighter	Albatros D.V	Out of control	North-west of Cambrai
4	31 October 1917 @ 1530	Bristol Fighter (A7235)	Albatros D.V	Destroyed in flames	Fresse
5	31 October 1917 @ 1530	Bristol Fighter (A7235)	Albatros D.V	Destroyed	Fresse
