= Thomas Stephenson (chemist) =

Scottish chemist and pharmacist

Thomas Stephenson FRSE FCS (28 November 1864 – 29 October 1938) was a Scottish chemist and pharmacist. He was founder and editor of "The Prescriber", a magazine focussing on pharmacists needs.

== Life ==
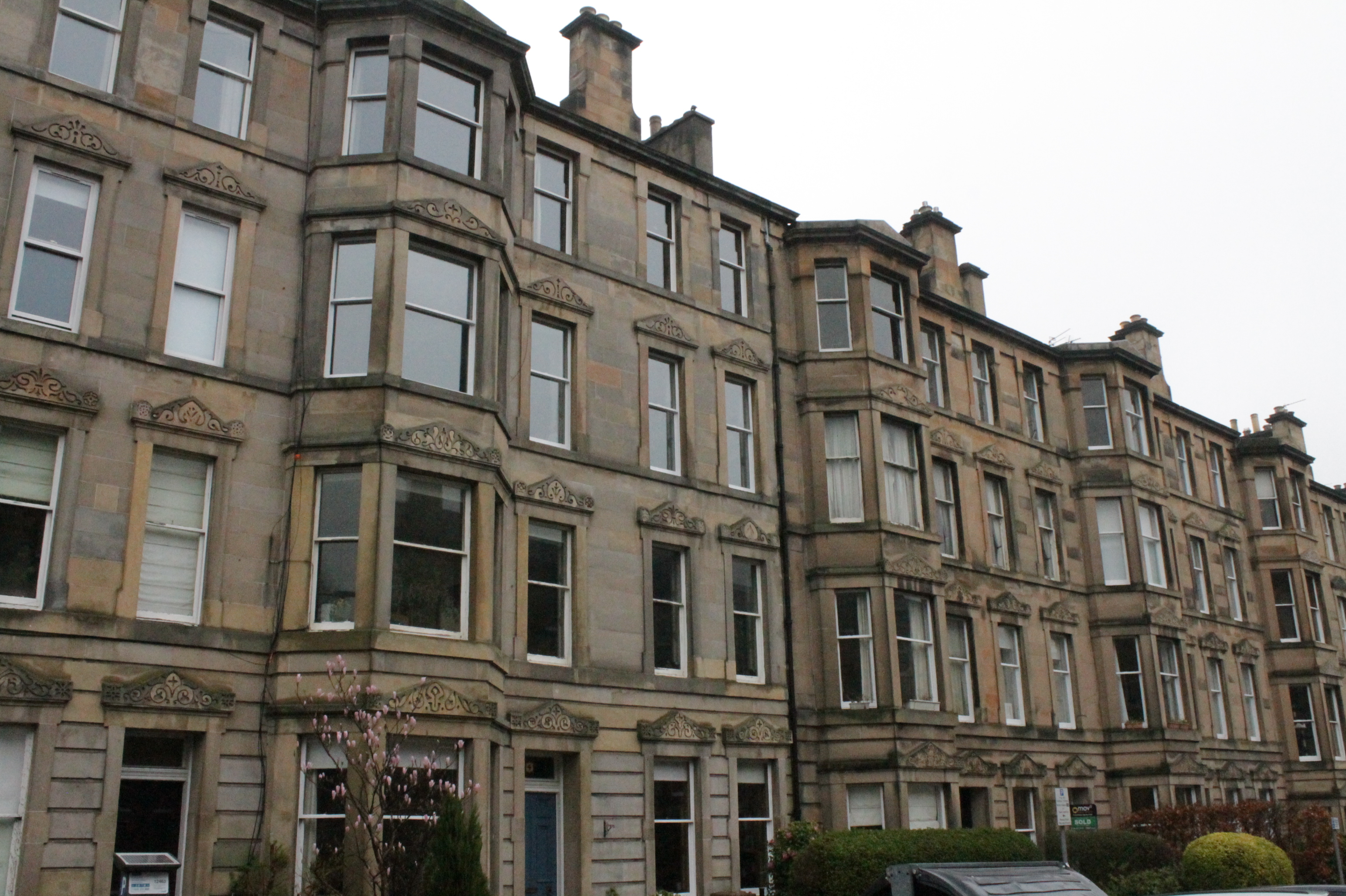
9 Woodburn Terrace, Edinburgh (centre)

He was born in 1864 at 37 George Street in Edinburgh's New Town the son of John Bertram Stephenson, a chemist with James Robertson & Co., and Jane (née Noble). He was educated at the Edinburgh Institution.

He trained as a chemist and joined his father, who had set up his own business, at 48 Frederick Street. The family then moved to 8 Belford Terrace near Dean Village.

In 1910 he was elected a Fellow of the Royal Society of Edinburgh. His proposers were Frederick Orpen Bower, Sir Thomas Richard Fraser, Robert McNair Ferguson, and Leonard Dobbin. By this time he was Editor of "The Prescriber" magazine, and had a shop at 137 George Street in the city centre, and was living at 9 Woodburn Terrace, a flat in the Morningside district.

In 1916 "The Prescriber" had offices at 6 South Charlotte Street off Charlotte Square.

Thomas was a member of Rotary International.

He did not marry, and died in Edinburgh on 29 October 1938.
