= Hans Bethge (aviator) =

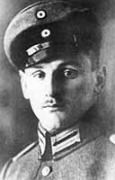
- Born: 6 December 1890; Berlin, German Empire
- Died: 17 March 1918 (aged 27); Passchendaele, Belgium
- Military career
- Allegiance: German Empire
- Branch: Aviation
- Service years: 1912 - 1918
- Rank: Oberleutnant
- Unit: Jagdstaffel 1
- Commands: Jagdstaffel 30
- Conflicts: World War I
- Awards: House Order of Hohenzollern, Iron Cross

Oberleutnant Hans Bethge HoH, IC (6 December 1890–17 March 1918) was a German pilot who was one of the first World War I flying aces, as well as an aerial commander. He was credited with 20 aerial victories. He was also a squadron commander for the unusually long term of fourteen months.

== Early life and ground service ==
Hans Bethge was a Berlin native, born on 6 December 1890. He was the second son of Lieutenant William Bethge. Hans Bethge grew up in Friedrichshafen on Lake Constance and, in 1911, went to high school in Ravensburg. At this time, his father died. The younger Bethge could not enlist in the navy because of mild near-sightness, so he enlisted in Eisenbahnregiment 1 (Railway Regiment 1) and was appointed an ensign. In 1912, he transferred to Eisenbahnregiment 4, underwent training, and was commissioned.

When World War I began, he went into action on the Western Front. His unit moved into action on the very first day of the war, serving as sappers. His service with them was ended by an ankle injury that sent him to hospital first in Maubeuge and then back to Germany. It was then he applied for pilot's training.

== Aerial service ==
After transferring to the Imperial German Air Service, he trained at Poznań for three months. After that, his first flying assignment was to fly LVG bombers with the world's first strategic bombing unit, the so-called "Ostend Carrier Pigeon detachment". From there, he went into fighter aviation on 4 August 1916, flying a Fokker Eindecker for a few weeks. On 23 August 1916, he was selected to be one of the founding members of Royal Prussian Jagdstaffel 1 (Jasta 1) under Martin Zander; the jasta was one of the first German fighter squadrons formed. On 29 August, Bethge shot down a B.E.2c near Auchonvillers for his first victory. He followed up by scoring two more confirmed victories before the end of 1916.

== Command ==
In January, he was appointed to the command of a new fighter squadron being formed, Royal Prussian Jagdstaffel 30. The new Staffelführer claimed his next victim on 28 March 1917, and began a steady scoring pace that had him showing a tally of 18 wins by 31 October 1917. It was during this stretch that he claimed three opposing aces as victims; Royal Naval Air Service ace Philip Andrew Johnston died in a collision with a wingman on 17 August, and Bethge shot down the Bristol F.2 Fighter crew of Thomas Frederick Stephenson and Sidney Platel on 31 October.

Bethge commented about the death of Johnston:

"I have my 12th and 13 shot down. The aircraft crashed together and both were gone. I do not want to hurt anyone. But I fly with an iron will and deepest sense of duty ..."

By early 1918, Bethge had been equipped with a new Pfalz D.III fighter. It featured tapering longitudinal gray and white stripes the length of the fuselage, with a dark gold diamond on the exterior cockpit walls. He scored twice more with this new machine, on 19 February and 10 March. He was recommended for the Pour le Merite, Germany's highest award for valor.

== Death in action ==
A week after his final victory, on the morning of 17 March 1918, Bethge once again led his fliers into combat. When he was still 200 meters from the British formation they were attacking, his Pfalz curved sharply downwards and out of sight, probably hit by return fire from a D.H.4 of No. 57 Squadron. His body was found at Passchendaele and laid out in the church nearest his jasta, in Phalempin. His funeral procession took place a few days later; Air Force General Ernst von Hoeppner and Rittmeister Manfred von Richthofen attended the march to the railway station. Bethge's body was sent home to Berlin, where it was buried in Jerusalem's Church cemetery near the Halle Gate. His mother was told on 18 March that her son would receive the Pour le Mérite; however, it had not been approved before his untimely death.
