= Benjamin Roxburgh-Smith =

British fighter ace (1884–1951)

- Born: 10 April 1884; Lee, London, UK
- Died: 1951 (aged 66–67); Rome, Italy
- Military career
- Allegiance: United Kingdom
- Branch: British Army; Royal Air Force
- Rank: Flight Lieutenant
- Nickname: "Dad"
- Units: Inns of Court Regiment; No. 60 Squadron RFC; No. 74 Squadron RFC/RAF
- Conflicts: World War I • Western Front; World War II
- Awards: Distinguished Flying Cross & Bar; Croix de guerre (Belgium)
- Other work: Aviation pioneer in southern Africa

Benjamin Roxburgh-Smith DFC* (10 April 1884 – 1951) was a British World War I fighter ace credited with 22 aerial victories.

Roxburgh-Smith was commissioned as a temporary second lieutenant in the Royal Flying Corps in 1916, aged 32. After pilot training, he was injured and assigned flight instructor duty but he returned to combat duty in early 1918 with the 74th Squadron. Roxburgh-Smith was promoted to lieutenant, flight commander, and then acting captain. During World War I, Roxburgh-Smith destroyed 17 aircraft and shot down 5 others.

After the war, Roxburgh-Smith emigrated to Southern Rhodesia. He farmed for several years before obtaining a private pilot's licence. Roxburgh-Smith worked as a pilot before raising funds to start the Rhodesian Aviation Syndicate, which was eventually absorbed into Imperial Airways. In 1932, Benjamin Roxburgh-Smith was appointed Superintendent of the Salisbury Municipal Aerodrome. Roxburgh-Smith enlisted again for service in World War II, receiving an emergency commission in the Royal Air Force Volunteer Reserve in 1940 at the age of 55. He was subsequently promoted to flight lieutenant in 1940, relinquishing his commission in 1943.

== Early life and military service ==
Roxburgh-Smith was born in Lee, London, on 10 April 1884. By the time World War I broke out he was working as a bank teller in Bromley, then still in Surrey. Though a married man with two children, and old enough to be nicknamed "Dad", he initially joined up as a private in the Inns of Court Regiment, which was then functioning as an officer cadet unit.

Roxburgh-Smith was commissioned as a temporary second lieutenant in the Royal Flying Corps on 12 August 1916. After completing pilot training he was posted to No. 60 Squadron RFC. In 1917, he was injured in the crash of a Nieuport Scout. Upon his return to service, he was assigned to flight instructor duty.

== Combat duty ==
Roxburgh-Smith returned to combat duty in early 1918 to fly SE.5as with No. 74 Squadron RFC. He was promoted to lieutenant on 12 February 1918, and flew in Mick Mannock's "A" Flight.

He destroyed his first enemy, an Albatros D.V, on 12 April 1918, in conjunction with Mannock and three other pilots. By 26 May, he was an ace, destroying his fifth consecutive enemy fighter aircraft. After scoring his eighth victory on 19 July, he was shot down, suffering minor injuries in the process. He returned to duty, and having been appointed a flight commander with the acting rank of captain on 4 August 1918, he shot down four enemy aircraft in both August and September, and in October five; two on 5 October, and three on 14 October, rounding out his score at 22.

His final count was 14 opposing fighters destroyed (two shared with other pilots); four fighters driven down out of control; three two-seater reconnaissance planes destroyed (one shared), and one reconnaissance aircraft driven down out of control. This made Roxburgh-Smith the third highest scoring ace out of the seventeen in No. 74 Squadron, after Mick Mannock and James Ira Thomas Jones.

=== List of aerial victories ===
Combat record
| No. | Date/Time | Aircraft/ Serial No. | Opponent | Result | Location | Notes |
|---|---|---|---|---|---|---|
| 1 | 12 April 1918 @ 1440 | S.E.5a | Albatros D.V | Destroyed | Bois de Phalempin | Shared with Captain Edward Mannock, and Lieutenants Henry Dolan, Percy Howe & Harris Clements. |
| 2 | 29 April 1918 @ 1150 | S.E.5a | LVG C | Destroyed | Dickebusch Lake | |
| 3 | 6 May 1918 @ 1520 | S.E.5a (C1108) | Fokker Dr.I | Destroyed | North-east of Ypres | Shared with Major Keith Caldwell. |
| 4 | 12 May 1918 @ 1825 | S.E.5a (C1108) | Pfalz D.III | Destroyed | North of Wulverghem | |
| 5 | 26 May 1918 @ 1930 | S.E.5a (C1108) | Pfalz D.III | Destroyed | Le Doulieu | |
| 6 | 17 June 1918 @ 0845 | S.E.5a (D6855) | Fokker D.VII | Destroyed | 4 miles south-east of Dickebusch | |
| 7 | 18 June 1918 @ 1745 | S.E.5a (D6855) | DFW C | Driven down out of control | 1 mile south of Bailleul | |
| 8 | 19 July 1918 @ 0850 | S.E.5a (E5949) | Pfalz D.III | Destroyed | North-east of Gheluvelt | |
| 9 | 10 August 1918 @ 1900 | S.E.5a | Fokker D.VII | Destroyed | East of Messines | |
| 10 | 17 August 1918 @ 0905 | S.E.5a (D6976) | Fokker D.VII | Driven down out of control | North of Houthoulst Forest | |
| 11 | 19 August 1918 @ 1930 | S.E.5a | Fokker D.VII | Destroyed | Houthem | |
| 12 | 23 August 1918 @ 1905–1933 | S.E.5a | Fokker D.VII | Destroyed in flames | Passchendaele | |
| 13 | 23 August 1918 @ 1905–1933 | S.E.5a | Fokker D.VII | Destroyed in flames | Passchendaele | |
| 14 | 21 September 1918 @ 1845 | S.E.5a | Fokker D.VII | Driven down out of control | Lille | |
| 15 | 24 September 1918 @ 1045 | S.E.5a | Rumpler C | Destroyed | Capinghem | |
| 16 | 26 September 1918 @ 1130 | S.E.5a (D6976) | Fokker D.VII | Destroyed | South-east of Warneton | |
| 17 | 26 September 1918 @ 1510 | S.E.5a (D6976) | DFW C | Destroyed | 3 miles south-east of Armentières | Shared with Lieutenant George Hicks. |
| 18 | 5 October 1918 @ 0930 | S.E.5a (D6976) | Fokker D.VII | Destroyed | 3 miles south-west of Roulers | |
| 19 | 5 October 1918 @ 0930 | S.E.5a (D6976) | Fokker D.VII | Driven down out of control | 3 miles south-west of Roulers | |
| 20 | 14 October 1918 @ 1500–1525 | S.E.5a | Fokker D.VII | Driven down out of control | Courtrai | |
| 21 | 14 October 1918 @ 1500–1525 | S.E.5a | Fokker D.VII | Destroyed | Lauwe | |
| 22 | 14 October 1918 @ 1500–1525 | S.E.5a | Fokker D.VII | Destroyed | Reckem | |

== African aviation pioneer ==
Roxburgh-Smith emigrated to Southern Rhodesia (now Zimbabwe) in 1920. He farmed for several years near the capital of Bulawayo. While he was farming, civil aviation struggled to establish itself in the country. In September 1926, he sold the farm and returned to England. Once there, he brushed up on his flying skills, and obtained a private pilot's license, after joining London Aeroplane Club.

Upon his return to Rhodesia in June 1927, he accepted a job flying as second pilot on an aerial survey for the Aircraft Operating Company. To garner the job, he qualified as the first South African commercial pilot at Roberts Heights, Pretoria. He was employed on the survey through February 1928.

Once again, he moved to England, only to return to Rhodesia in February 1929. This time, he had the backing of Cobham-Blackburn Airlines, which was dedicated to establishing civil aviation routes the length of Africa, from Cairo, Egypt, to Cape Town, South Africa. With this backing, he was able to raise enough local financial aid to start the Rhodesian Aviation Syndicate, which was eventually absorbed into Imperial Airways.

Roxburgh-Smith resigned from the new company in May 1931, with the aim of working for Glen Kidston. The latter was independently wealthy, and wanted in on South African aviation. Kidston's death in an air crash on 5 May scotched that plan, so Roxburgh-Smith returned to England on 1 June.

In 1932, Benjamin Roxburgh-Smith was appointed Superintendent of the Salisbury Municipal Aerodrome (later renamed Belvedere Airport).

== World War II service ==
Roxburgh-Smith returned to service in World War II, having first joined the Southern Rhodesian Air Force, he received an emergency (for the duration of hostilities) commission in the Royal Air Force Volunteer Reserve on 1 March 1940 as a pilot officer, at aged 55. He was subsequently promoted to flight lieutenant on 20 September 1940. He eventually relinquished his RAFVR commission, and was transferred to the Southern Rhodesian Air Force Reserve of Officers on 1 October 1943.

Roxburgh-Smith died in Rome, Italy, in 1951 while on a tour of Europe.

== Honours and awards ==
Distinguished Flying Cross
Lieutenant (Temporary Captain) Benjamin Roxburgh-Smith.

"This officer has shot down six enemy aeroplanes during the last few months. Bold in attack, skilful in defence, he is a valuable airman." (1 November 1918)

Bar to the Distinguished Flying Cross
Lieutenant (Acting Captain) Benjamin Roxburgh-Smith, DFC.

"A leader of outstanding merit whose influence has had a great effect on maintaining the morale of his squadron. He has engaged in many combats with hostile aeroplanes, displaying marked skill and courage. Since May last he has accounted for twelve hostile machines." (7 February 1919)

Croix de guerre (Belgium)
Captain Benjamin Roxburgh-Smith, DFC.

"For valuable services rendered in connection with the war." (20 February 1919)
