= No. 74 Squadron RAF =

Defunct flying squadron of the Royal Air Force

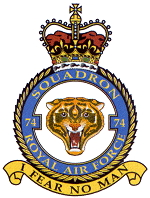
- Active: 1 July 1917 – 1 April 1918 (RFC); 1 April 1918 – 3 July 1919 (RAF); 3 Sept 1935 – 25 August 1971; 19 Oct 1984 – 1 October 1992; 5 Oct 1992 – 22 September 2000
- Country: United Kingdom
- Allegiance: British Armed Forces
- Branch: Royal Air Force
- Type: Flying squadron
- Role: disbanded
- Nicknames: Tiger Squadron; Trinidad
- Motto: I Fear No Man
- Mascot: Bengal tiger
- Former aircraft: see below
- Battle honours: Western Front (1918)*; France & Low Countries (1940)*; Dunkirk*; Battle of Britain (1940)*; Fortress Europe (1940–1941) and (1944)*; Home Defence (1940–1941); Mediterranean (1943)*; Walcheren; Normandy (1944)*; France and Germany (1944–1945)*; Rhine; *Honours marked with an asterisk may be emblazoned on the Squadron Standard

Insignia
- Squadron badge heraldry: A tiger's face. Approved by King George VI in February 1937. (Developed from an unofficial emblem used during the First World War.)
- Squadron codes: JH (Feb 1939 – Sep 1939); ZP (Sep 1939 – Apr 1942); 4D (Apr 1944 – Apr 1951); TA–TZ (Hawks)
- Squadron flash

No. 74 Squadron, also known as 'Tiger Squadron' from its tiger-head motif, was a squadron of the Royal Air Force (RAF). It operated fighter aircraft from 1917 to the 1990s, and then trainer aircraft until its disbandment in 2000. It was the Royal Air Force's member of the NATO Tiger Association from 1961 until the squadron's disbandment, it has since been replaced by No. 230 Squadron.

Forming in 1917 as No. 74 (Training Depot) Squadron, the unit began life as a training squadron. Sent to the Western Front in 1918 as No. 74 (Fighter) Squadron, the unit quickly developed a fierce reputation during the First World War due to its pilots having an aggressive 'Tiger'-like spirit. With many aces amongst its ranks (such as Mick Mannock, Taffy Jones and Sydney Carlin), No. 74 (F) Squadron managed 225 victories in only seven months at the front. 'The Tigers' went on to serve during the Second World War, fighting in the Battle of Britain. After the war, it formed the first all-jet fighter wing with No. 616 and No. 504 Squadrons, flying the Gloster Meteor F.3. In 1960, they became the first unit in the RAF to operate the English Electric Lightning F.1. Between 1962 and 1963, No. 74 (F) Squadron operated an aerobatic display team called 'The Tigers' made up of nine Lightnings; it was the first display team in the world to fly aircraft capable of Mach 2.

From October 1984 onwards, 'The Tigers' operated from RAF Wattisham, Suffolk, flying the unique McDonnell Douglas F-4J(UK) Phantom. These were kept up until January 1991, when they were exchanged for the Spey–powered Phantom FGR.2s. Under the Options for Change defence review in 1990, it was decided to retire the remaining Phantom squadrons (No. 74 (F) Squadron and No. 56 (F) Squadron), with this coming to fruition by October 1992. 'The Tigers' spent their last eight years as No. 74 (Reserve) Squadron, operating the BAe Hawk T.1/T.1A from RAF Valley training future fighter pilots. No. 74 (R) Squadron disbanded for the last time on 22 September 2000.

== History ==
=== First World War ===
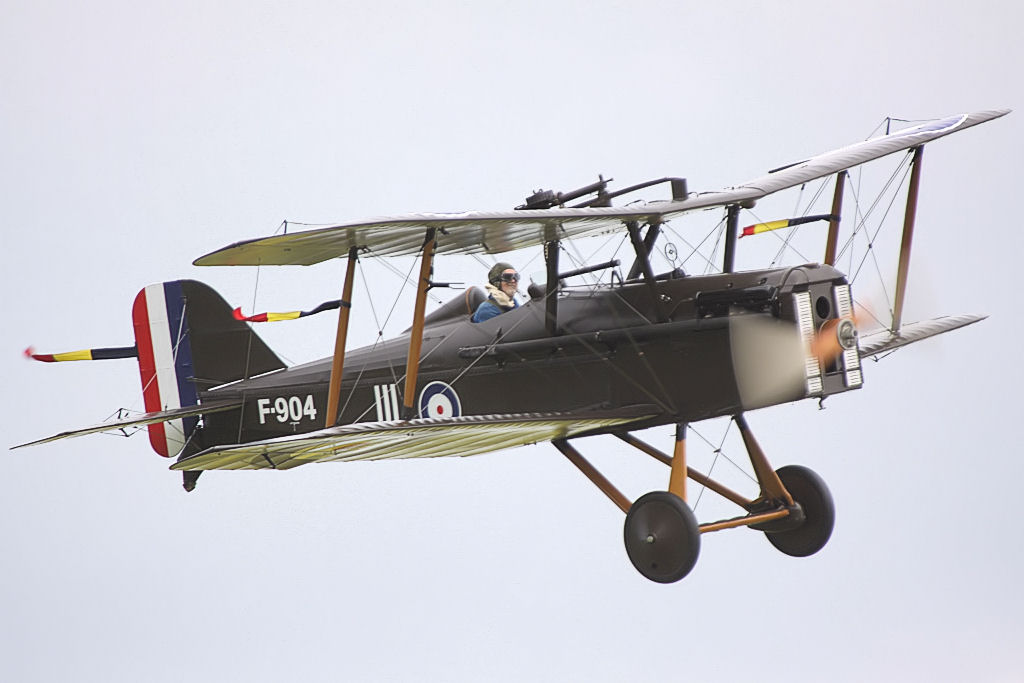
Royal Aircraft Factory S.E.5a (replica), similar to those operated by No. 74 (F) Squadron in 1918 and 1919

No. 74 Squadron was first formed at Northolt on 1 July 1917; 109 years ago, as No. 74 (Training Depot) Squadron of the Royal Flying Corps (RFC), before relocating to the aerodrome at London Colney nine days later. Beginning life as a training unit, the squadron initially flew the Avro 504Ks, among other types, before working-up to a fighter squadron. In February 1918, Mick Mannock became the senior flight commander of the squadron as it reached front-line status, becoming No. 74 (Fighter) Squadron.

On 20 March 1918, the squadron received its first operational fighters, the Royal Aircraft Factory S.E.5a. On 30 March, the squadron was sent over to the RFC headquarters in Saint-Omer, France. No. 74 (F) Squadron saw its first action on 12 April when it engaged in a dogfight near Merville against the German Luftstreitkräfte, with Mannock scoring 'the Tigers' first kill: an Albatros Scout. Within 70 days of being on the continent, No. 74 (F) Squadron had notched 100 enemy kills to just one loss. The squadron served in France from April until February 1919, when it returned home to RAF Lopcombe Corner, Hampshire, where it was disbanded on 3 July 1919.

During its 7-month-long wartime service, it was credited with 140 enemy planes destroyed and 85 driven down out of control, for 225 victories. Seventeen aces had served in the squadron, including Victoria Cross winner Major Edward 'Mick' Mannock, Ira 'Taffy' Jones, Benjamin Roxburgh-Smith, future Air Commodore Keith Caldwell, Andrew Kiddie, Frederick Stanley Gordon, Sydney Carlin, Frederick Hunt, Clive Glynn, George Hicks, Wilfred Ernest Young, Henry Dolan, Harris Clements, George Gauld, and Frederick Luff.

=== Interwar years ===
In response to the ongoing Abyssinia Crisis of 1935, the squadron was reformed in unusual circumstances on 3 September. The squadron was reborn out of the combination of detachments of Nos. 3, 23, 32, 56, 65, and 601 Squadrons, who were on board the troopship ship Neutralia, which was en-route to Malta. After arrival, No. 74 (F) Squadron operated Hawker Demon two-seater fighters. While it had been officially re-established, the squadron was prohibited from identifying its aircraft by squadron number until 14 November 1935 due to security reasons; until then, it was referred to as 'Demon Flights'.

In the following July, the squadron and its Demons, were shipped back to England, with the squadron arriving at RAF Hornchurch in September 1936. On 20 December 1936, Adolph Gysbert 'Sailor' Malan was posted to 'the Tigers'. In February 1937, after years of unofficial use, No. 74 (F) Squadron had its squadron badge design; a tiger's face, officially approved by King George VI. 'The Tigers' re-equipped with Gloster Gauntlets in April 1937, forming part of the newly created Fighter Command. The Gauntlets were kept up until February 1939, when the squadron began converting to the Supermarine Spitfire Mk.I.

=== Second World War ===
==== Battle of France and Britain ====
Squadron Leader John Mungo-Park DFC & Bar, OC No. 74 (Fighter) Squadron between March and June 1941. Between Sept. 1939 and his death on 27 June 1941, Mungo-Park scored 11 victories with the unit.

At the outbreak of war, No. 74 (F) Squadron was operating from RAF Rochford, a satellite aerodrome of RAF Hornchurch. On 6 September 1939, after an early morning air raid alert, a flight of No. 56 (F) Squadron Hawker Hurricanes took off from North Weald. These were followed by two reserve Hurricanes. The two reserves were identified as enemy aircraft, and Spitfires from RAF Hornchurch, among them No. 74 (F) Squadron, were ordered to attack them. Both were shot down. One pilot, P/O Montague Hulton-Harrop was killed; the other pilot, Frank Rose, survived. The pilot who fired the fatal shots was No. 74 (F) Squadron's John Freeborn. The exact story of what happened in this incident, which came to be known as the Battle of Barking Creek, may never be known. Even the origin of the name is obscure, as it did not take place above Barking Creek but near Ipswich, in Suffolk. At the subsequent court martial, it was accepted that the entire incident was an unfortunate error.

"A magnificent day's fighting, 74... This is the way to keep the measure of the Boche. Mannock started it and you keep it up."

— telegram from Chief of the Air Staff Sir Cyril Newall, after 'the Tigers' claimed 24 victories and 14 damaged on 11 August 1940.

The squadron, as part of No. 12 Group, first saw combat in May 1940 during the evacuation from Dunkirk, in battles which exacted a heavy toll on both pilots and aircraft. Thereafter No. 74 (F) Squadron served successfully through the Battle of Britain, being heavily involved throughout June and July. On 11 August, the squadron flew four sorties, and by the end of the day, had claimed 24 victories and 14 damaged. On 14 August, No. 74 (F) Squadron was posted to RAF Wittering for rest, and shortly after moved onto RAF Kirton in Lindsey and then onto RAF Coltishall, Norfolk. It was here at Coltishall in September 1940 that the squadron replaced their Spitfire Mk.Is with the Mk.IIa. The squadron moved back south to RAF Biggin Hill in October for the end of the Battle. Between November and December 1940, No. 74 (F) Squadron destroyed 38 enemy aircraft.

With the Battle of Britain won, the squadron were posted to RAF Manston, Kent, in February 1941. The squadron then went to the north of England to RAF Acklington in July 1941 to regroup, from there moving around to stations in Wales (RAF Llanbedr) and Northern Ireland (RAF Long Kesh). During this time, the Governor of Trinidad and Tobago, Sir Hubert Winthrop Young, made a presentation of Spitfires to No. 74 (F) Squadron. This subsequently led to 'the Tigers' being named the 'Trinidad Squadron', a name that lasted until the 1950s.

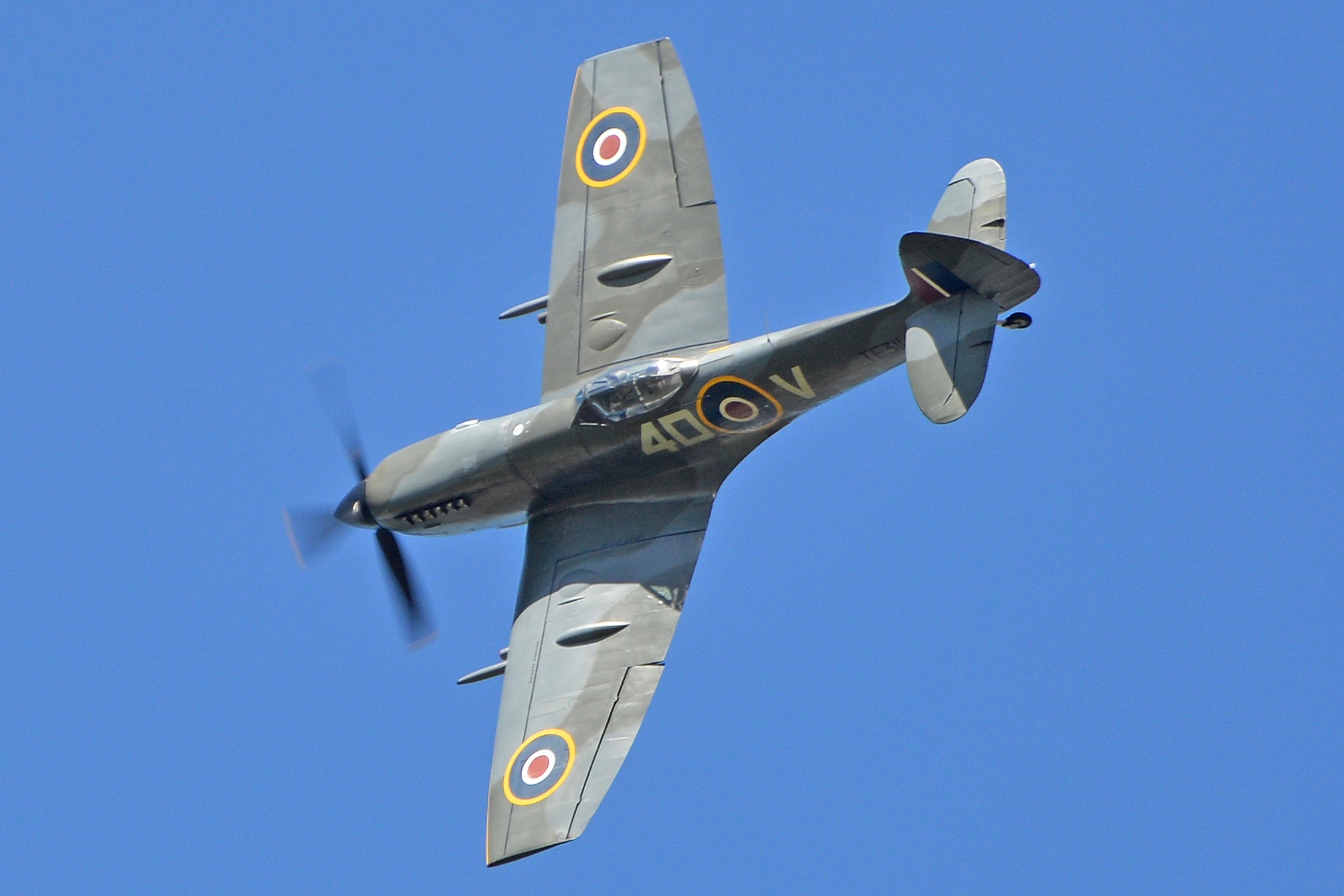
Supermarine Spitfire LF.XVIe in markings of Squadron Leader A. J. 'Tony' Reeves DFC, Officer Commanding No. 74 (F) Squadron from December 1944 to May 1945.

==== Middle East and the liberation of Europe ====
The squadron finally made a move from RAF Long Kesh in April 1942, when it was sent the Middle East, arriving in Egypt in June. The ship carrying their aircraft they had been due to fly had been sunk leaving 'the Tigers' without anything to fly. No. 74 (F) Squadron was then moved to Palestine in July, where a decision was made for the squadron to operate as a maintenance unit for USAAF B-24 Liberators. The squadron finally recovered its air capability in December 1942, when they received Hurricane Mk.IIBs, forming part of No. 219 (Fighter) Group. During this time, they operated from RAF Habbaniya in Iraq, and were also based in Iran. The squadron, now commanded by Squadron Leader James Hayter, moved back to Egypt in May 1943, arriving at Landing Ground 106 near El Dabaa, in order to carry out shipping patrols. On 23 July, 'the Tigers' took part in a large offensive over Axis-occupied Crete, in which they attacked radio direction finder (RDF) stations and barracks, among other targets, severely damaging them. The squadron converted back to Spitfires in September 1943, this time to Mk.Vbs and Mk.Vcs, as they were transferred over to Cyprus to participate in the failed Dodecanese campaign. For 11 days, the squadron was temporarily based at Peristerona Airfield, transferred by trucks. Heavy rainstorm prompted a subsequent relocation to Nicosia on 22 October 1943. 'The Tigers' withdrew back to Egypt, and in late October 1943, the squadron got Mk.IX Spitfires, which were swapped for Mk.XVIes in March 1944.

No. 74 (F) Squadron returned home in April 1944 to RAF North Weald, before moving onto RAF Lympne. They had arrived back just in time to participate in the buildup for Operation Overlord (the Allied invasion of Normandy in June 1944). It was equipped with the Spitfire Mk.IX HF operating while from RAF Lympne in Air Defence of Great Britain, though under the operational control of RAF Second Tactical Air Force (2nd TAF). During this time, they attacked Axis railway yards and escorted Allied bombing raids on V-1 flying bomb launch sites in occupied France as part of D-Day preparations. On 3 July, the squadron left RAF Lympe for RAF Tangmere, as part of No. 134 Wing, before leaving for Sommervieu, Normandy in August 1944 and joining No. 145 Wing. From here, they supported the Allied advance through France, Belgium, and the Netherlands, in a fighter-bomber role. No. 74 (F) Squadron operated from aerodromes in Lille, Courtrai, Duerne, and Schijndel during this time. In March 1945, the squadron received Spitfire Mk.XVIs, which they operated alongside their Mk.IXs. On 16 April, 'the Tigers' were based at Drope in Germany, from here they were used to carry out reconnaissance missions over Wilhelmshaven. It was while based here that No. 74 (F) Squadron received news of Germany's surrender. The squadron finally left Germany on 11 May 1945, returning to Britain.

=== Post-War ===
==== Meteors, Hunters, and Lightnings ====
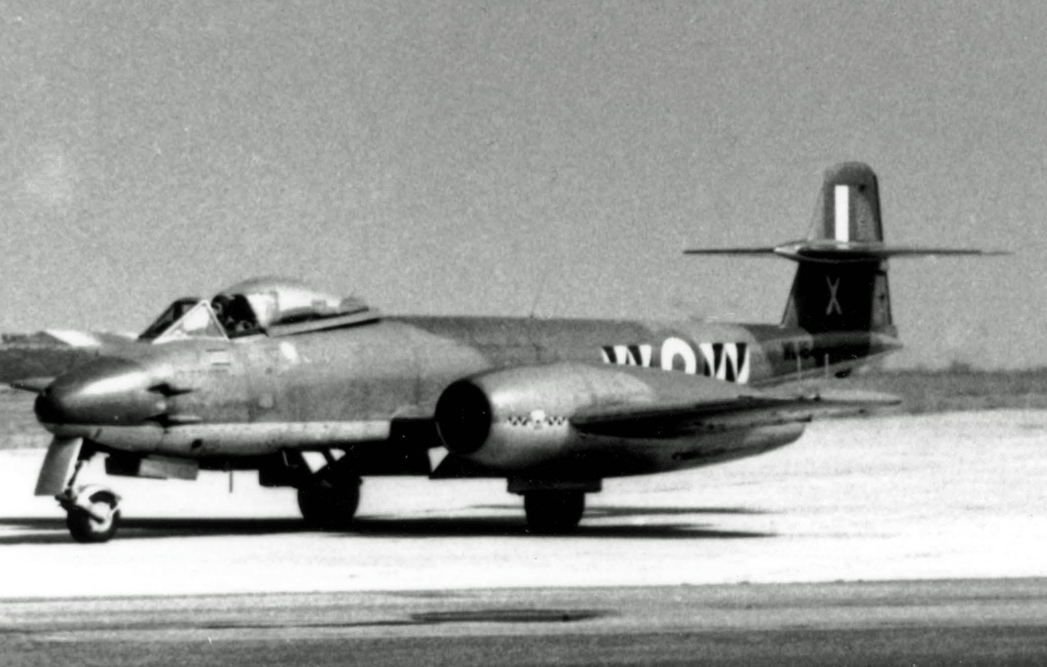
No. 74 (F) Squadron Gloster Meteor F.8 WL164 wearing Tiger Stripes at RAF Hooton Park, 1955.

Upon arrival back to England, No. 74 (F) Squadron converted to their first jet aircraft; the Gloster Meteor F.3, being based at RAF Colerne, Wiltshire. The squadron soon moved to RAF Bentwaters, before finally settling at RAF Horsham St Faith, Norfolk in August 1946. While here, as one of the first adopters of the Meteor F.3, the squadron formed the first all jet fighter wing with No. 616 Squadron and No. 504 Squadron. 'The Tigers' had a brief stay at RAF Lübeck between July and August 1947. From December 1947, onward, the squadron began to re-equip with Meteor F.4s, completing conversion by March 1948. In October 1950, the squadron received the much improved Meteor F.8. From 1954 onward, the squadron's Meteors began to be camouflaged in dark green and dark sea grey, this coincidentally marked the return of 'tiger stripe' markings on the squadron's aircraft; something not seen since the Gloster Gauntlets. After 12 years of flying Meteors, No. 74 (F) Squadron converted to the Hawker Hunter F.4 in March 1957. The Hunter F.4s wouldn't be operated for long, as the squadron started to re-equip with Hunter F.6s in November 1957, with the Hunter F.4s being phased out by January 1958.

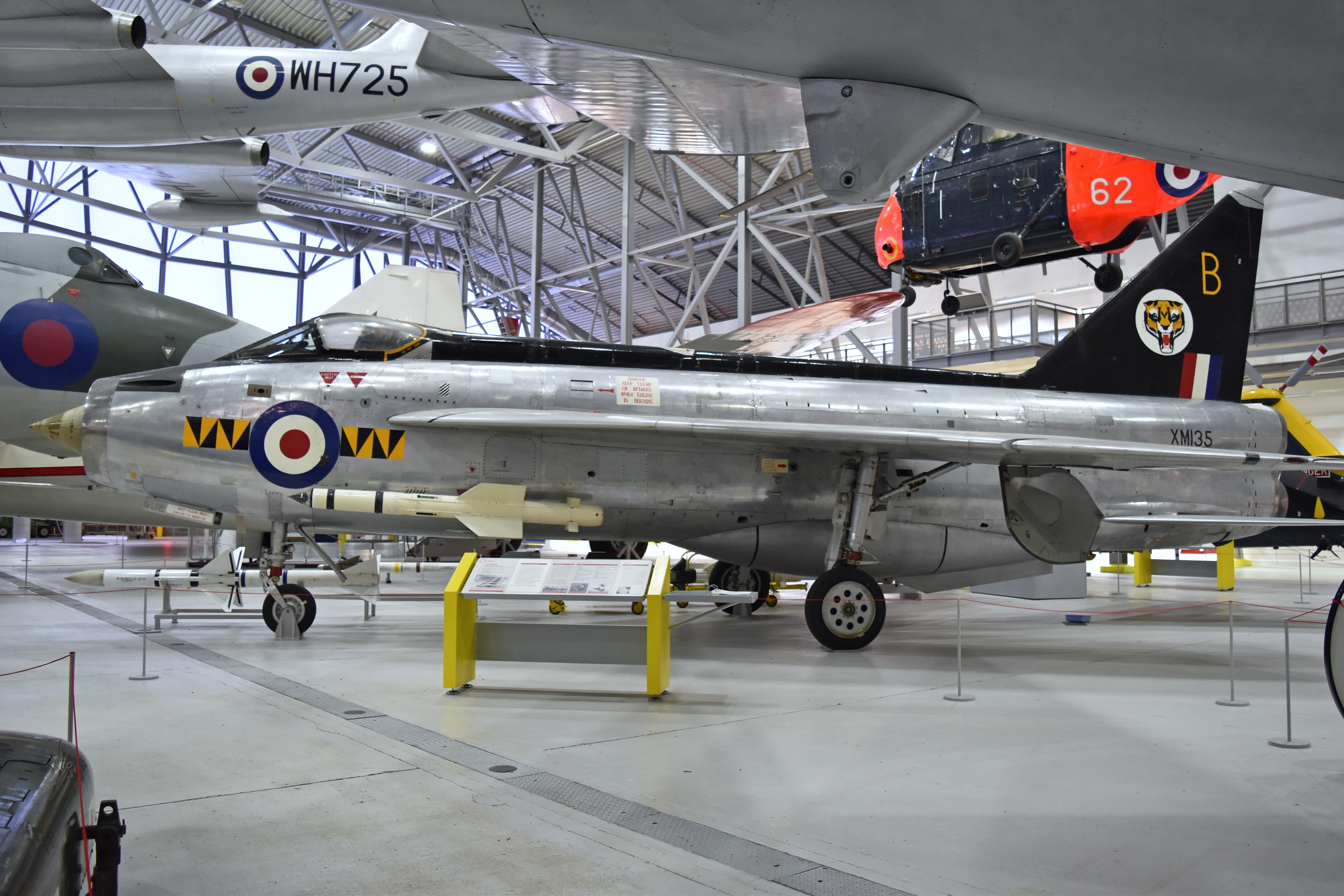
No. 74 (F) Squadron English Electric Lightning F.1 at Imperial War Museum Duxford

On 8 June 1959, 'the Tigers', under the command of Squadron Leader John 'Johnny' Howe, moved to RAF Coltishall for re-equipment with the English Electric Lightning F.1 in June 1960; this was the first squadron in the RAF to receive the Lightning. In 1962, No. 74 (F) Squadron formed an aerobatic display team; The Tigers, replacing No. 92 Squadron's Blue Diamonds as the RAF's official display team. On 2 March 1964, the squadron moved up to RAF Leuchars in Scotland, before getting the Lightning F.3 in April. While based at RAF Leuchars, No. 74 (F) Squadron held their first Tiger Meet between 5 and 9 July 1966, having joined the NATO Tiger Association at its inception in 1961. 'The Tigers' upgraded to Lightning F.6s in November 1966, with the last Lightning F.3s remaining up until January 1967.

The squadron moved to RAF Tengah in Singapore in June 1967, where it operated alongside No. 20 Squadron, which flew Hunters, and No. 81 Squadron, which flew Canberra PR.9s. In June 1969, while based in Singapore, four Lightning F.6s flew a distance of 2,000 miles from RAF Tengah to Darwin, Northern Territory in Australia, setting the longest non-stop flight made by a Lightning. In 1971, the squadron flew its Lightning F.6s to RAF Akrotiri, Cyprus, to hand them over to No. 56 (F) Squadron, who were flying Lightning F.3s, and then disbanded on 25 August 1971.

==== Phantoms, Hawks, and final disbandment ====
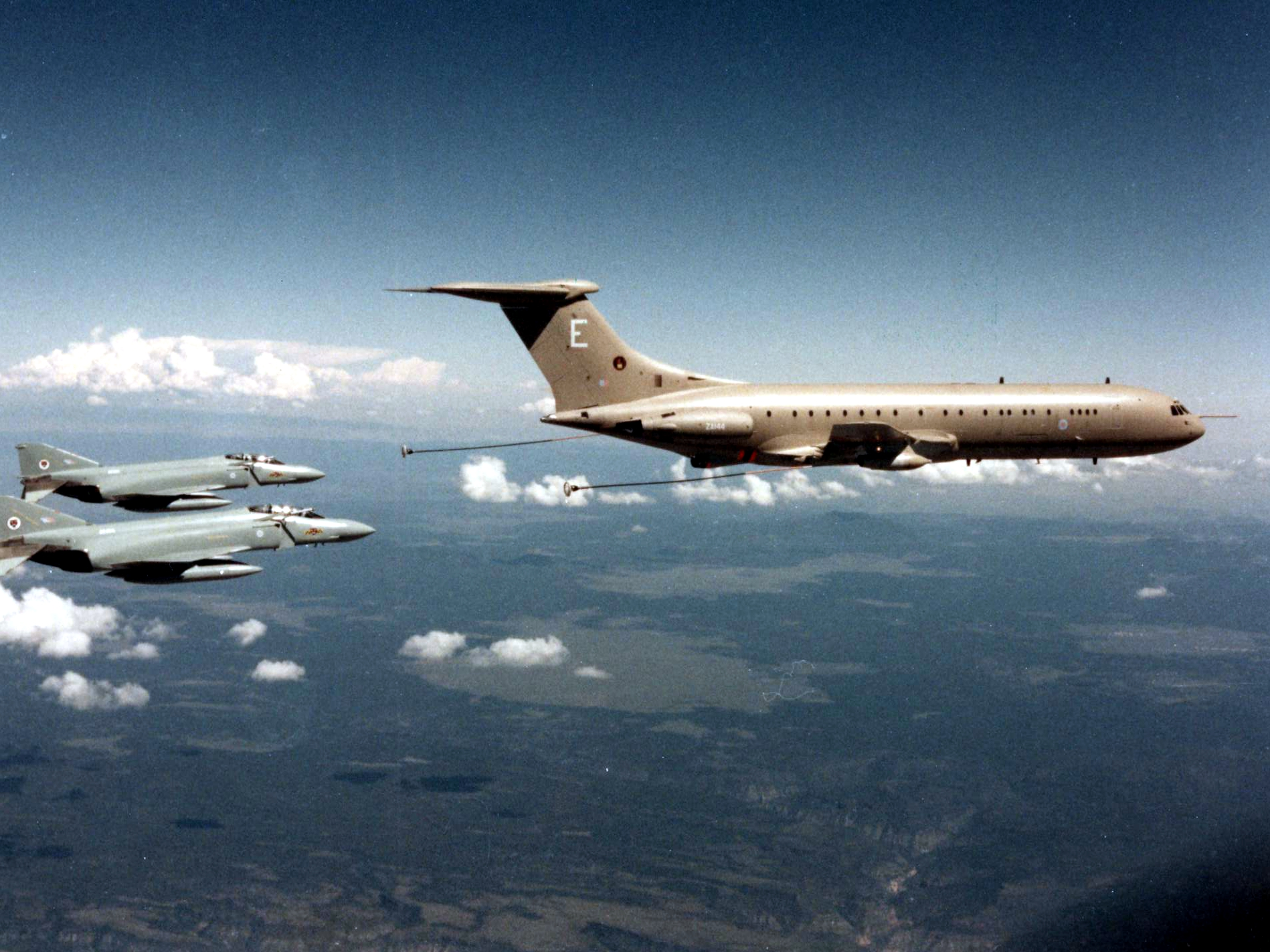
No. 74 (F) Squadron McDonnell Douglas F-4J(UK) Phantoms about to refuel from a No. 101 Squadron Vickers VC10 K.2 while on delivery to RAF Wattisham, 1984.

After a dormancy of 13 years, No. 74 (Fighter) Squadron was reformed at RAF Wattisham, Suffolk, on 19 October 1984, with ex-US Navy McDonnell Douglas F-4J Phantom IIs (designated as the F-4J(UK) in RAF service). These were purchased by the RAF as a stop-gap measure to replace those of No. 23 (F) Squadron that had been sent to the Falklands after the war. The 15 F-4Js cost $125 million, and underwent a full rework at the Naval Air Rework Facility at Naval Air Station North Island, San Diego. Here they received the ability to use the Skyflash air-to-air missile, their radar was upgraded, and were brought up to a spec similar to the more definitive F-4S; they were also sprayed in a distinct duck egg blue colour. The F-4J(UK)s were then ferried across the Atlantic in three different batches supported by Vickers VC10s, with the last group arriving on 5 January 1985. Late April and early May 1985 saw 'the Tigers' participate in their first major exercise; Exercise Priory, which sought to test UK air defences. July 1985 saw a deployment out to RAF Akrotiri to undergo an Armament Practice Camp (APC); which also saw them carry out dissimilar air combat training (DACT) with Grumman F-14A Tomcats of VF-41 and VF-84 (from USS Nimitz). The squadron's operational capability was declared on 31 December 1985.

No. 74 (F) Squadron's first intercept of the Phantom era was made on 7 April 1986, when a Tupolev Tu-142 Bear-F was intercepted. October 1986 saw a squadron exchange with 350th Squadron of the Belgian Air Force, seeing four SABCA F-16 Fighting Falcons arriving at Wattisham and four F-4J(UK)s going to Beauvechain Air Base. The squadron underwent another APC between February and March 1987, once again carrying out DACT with U.S. Navy Tomcats. On 1 July 1987, 'the Tigers' celebrated their 70th anniversary by attempting to break the London-to-Edinburgh speed record, succeeding in doing so with a time of 27 minutes and 3 seconds. On 26 August 1987, No. 74 (F) Squadron lost F-4J(UK) Phantom ZE358 in a fatal accident near Aberystwyth, Wales. Both crew members, Flt. Lt. Euan Holm Murdoch and Fg. Off. Jeremy Lindsey Ogg were killed.

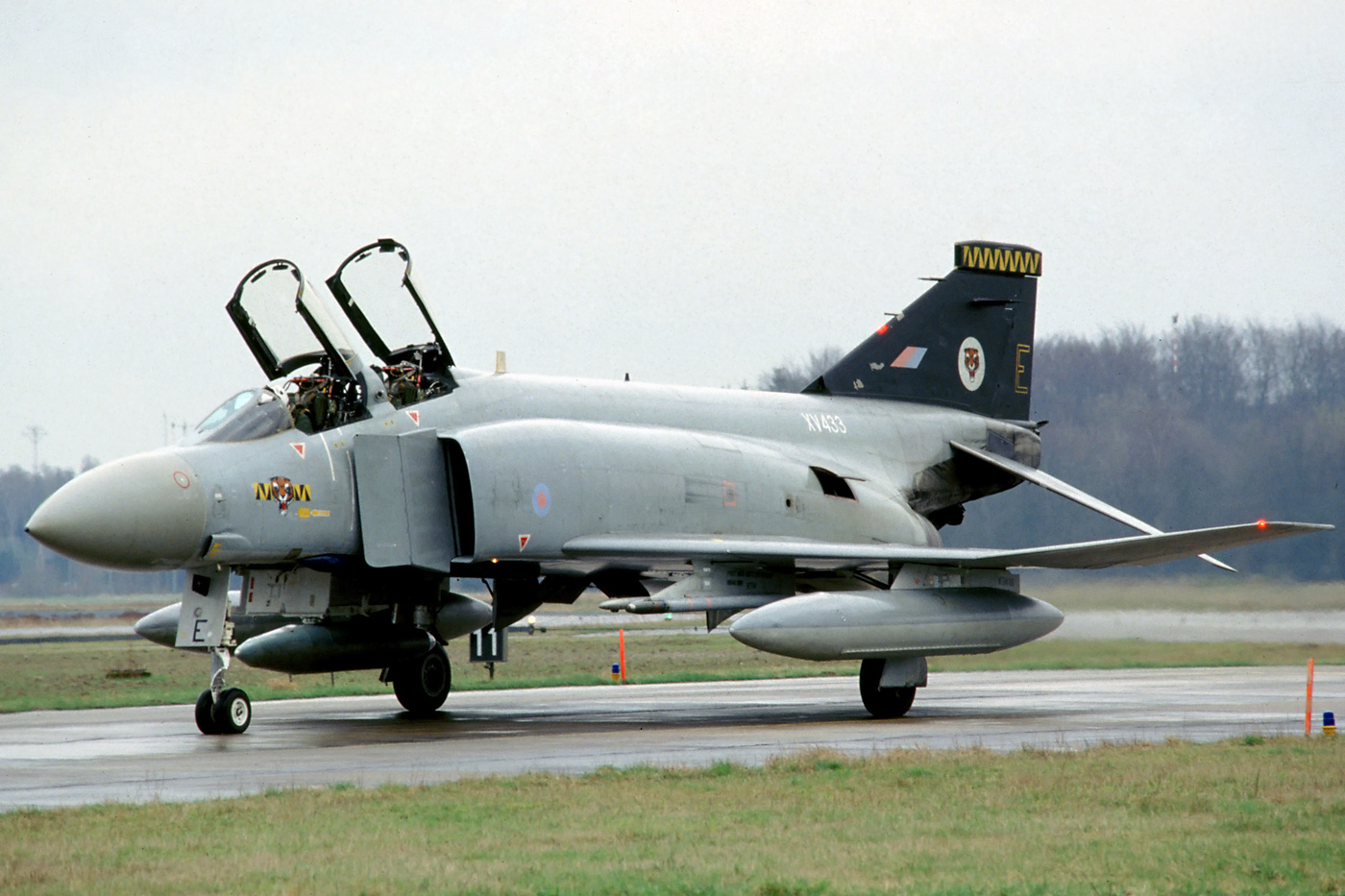
No. 74 (F) Squadron McDonnell Douglas FGR.2 at Twente Air Base, 1992

'The Tigers' operated their unique F-4J(UK)s up until January 1991, when they converted over to surplus Phantom FGR.2s, which were available due to other squadrons converting to the Panavia Tornado F.3. Although converted to the Phantom FGR.2, the squadron continued to make F-4J(UK) flights throughout February 1991, delivering them to their new homes to undertake varies new duties; such as ZE360, which was delivered to RAF Manston in Kent on 22 February 1991 to become a fire training aid. Plans had originally been for the RAF to retain two Phantom squadrons, 'the Tigers' and her sister No. 56 (F) Squadron ('the Firebirds'), at RAF Wattisham, but with the end of the Cold War, these plans were shelved. Instead under the Options for Change defence review, all remaining Phantoms would be withdrawn from service. The disbanding of No. 228 OCU at RAF Leuchars led to 'the Tigers' operating the Phantom Training Flight between 1 February 1991 and 31 December 1991.

No. 74 (F) Squadron participated in their penultimate Tiger Meet as a fighter squadron at Los Llanos Air Base, Spain between 14 and 22 May 1992. Both Phantom squadrons carried out their final APC at RAF Akrotiri in early June, marking a draw down in operations. On 13 June 1992, both No. 56 (F) Squadron and No. 74 (F) Squadron participated in Queen Elizabeth II's official birthday flypast over Buckingham Palace with a 16-ship diamond formation (eight Phantoms from each squadron), one of the last acts by the Phantom fleet.

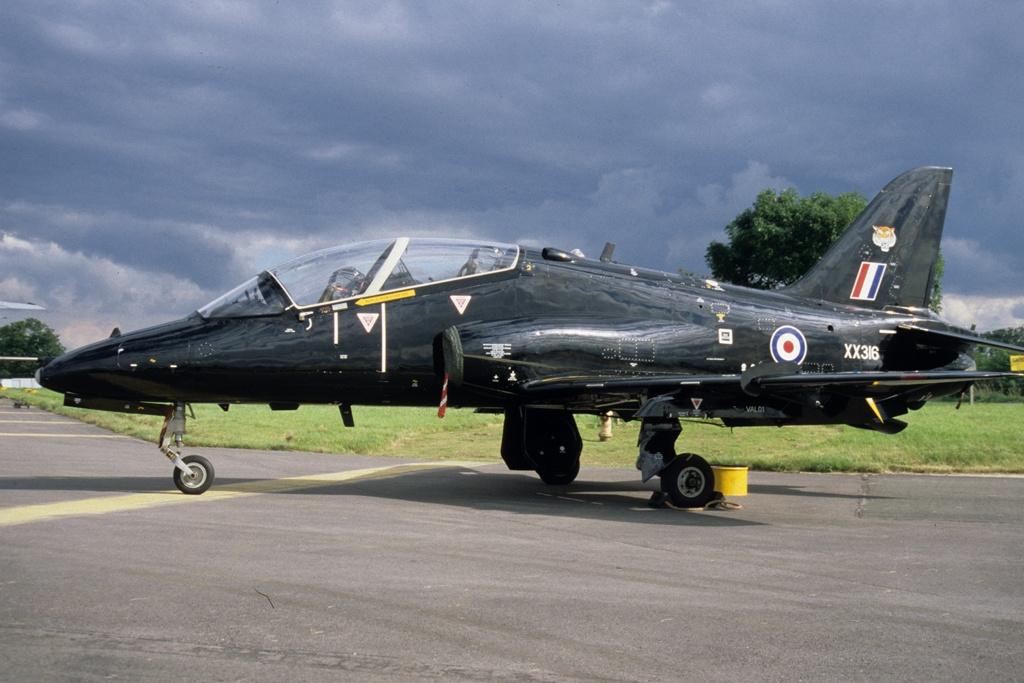
No. 74 (R) Squadron British Aerospace Hawk T.1A at RIAT, 1998

By August 1992, No. 56 (F) Squadron had relocated to RAF Coningsby; having stood down on 31 July, and became the Operational Conversion Unit (OCU) for the Tornado F.3, leaving 'the Tigers' as the RAF's last remaining Phantom squadron. Throughout its last year, No. 74 (F) Squadron flew an aerobatic display around the country, sporting colours of both 'the Tigers' and 'the Firebirds'. The Phantom FGR.2 XT914 was flown by Squadron Leader Archie Liggat and Flt. Lt. Mark 'Manners' Manwaring. 'The Tigers' held a mini Tiger Meet at RAF Wattisham between 14 and 17 September to mark the Phantom's retirement, inviting the Dutch, French, Portuguese, and the USAF among others, British Aerospace Hawk T.1s from No. 4 FTS, which No. 74 (F) Squadron would soon operate, also participated. One of No. 74 (F) Squadron's last acts was to flyover RAF Wattisham in a 'diamond nine' formation, before finally disbanding on 1 October 1992. Although disbanded, 'the Tigers' made their last Phantom flight on 1 November 1992 with a pair of Phantoms departing Wattisham; with one (XV474) going to the Imperial War Museum Duxford, Cambridgeshire. RAF Wattisham shortly thereafter began its transition over to the Army Air Corps, becoming Wattisham Airfield in March 1993.

On 5 October 1992, No. 74 (Reserve) Squadron stood up with the Hawk T.1 as part of No. 4 Flying Training School (4 FTS) at RAF Valley in the weapon instruction role. At the 1993 Tiger Meet, No. 74 (R) Squadron won the coveted 'Silver Tiger' trophy while competing against the likes of Spanish Mirage F1s and Belgian F-16s; as Flt. Lt. Will Jonas said, "Not bad for a training unit eh?!" With the rationalisation of No. 4 FTS to just two squadrons, No. 74 (R) Squadron was disbanded for the last time on 22 September 2000. Upon disbandment, the squadron Standard was laid up at RAF College Cranwell in the rotunda of the College Hall Officers’ Mess. On 16 February 2025, the squadron Standards of Nos. 74 and 111 Squadrons were laid up in St Clement Danes in London, meaning those Standards cannot be reactivated again.

== Famous pilots ==
Famous pilots associated with the squadron:

- Keith Caldwell
- John Freeborn – 12 kills, 1 probable, 5 damaged, was with his squadron longer than any other Battle of Britain pilot and had flown more operational hours.
- James Ira Thomas `Taffy' Jones - 37 victories
- A. G. 'Sailor' Malan – 32 victories
- Edward Mannock – 61 victories of which 35 were made with No. 74 Squadron
- John Mungo-Park

== Aircraft operated ==
Aircraft operated included:

- Avro 504K (Jul 1917 – Mar 1918)
- Sopwith Pup (Jan 1918 – Mar 1918)
- Sopwith Scout (Jan 1918 – Mar 1918)
- Royal Aircraft Factory S.E.5a (Mar 1918 – Feb 1919)
- Hawker Demon Mk.I (Sep 1935 – Apr 1937)
- Gloster Gladiator Mk.I (Mar 1937)
- Gloster Gauntlet Mk.II (Mar 1937 – Feb 1939)
- Miles Magister Mk.I (1938–1944)
- Supermarine Spitfire Mk.I/Ia (Feb 1939 – Sep 1940)
- Supermarine Spitfire Mk.IIa/IIb (Jun 1940 – Dec 1941)
- Vickers-Supermarine Spitfire Mk.Vb (May 1941 – Mar 1942)
- Hawker Hurricane Mk.I/IIb/IIc (Dec 1942 – Sep 1943)
- Vickers-Supermarine Spitfire Mk.Vb (Sep 1943 – Apr 1944)
- Vickers-Supermarine Spitfire Mk.Vc (Sep 1943 – Apr 1944)
- Vickers-Supermarine Spitfire Mk.IX (Oct 1943 – Apr 1944)
- Vickers-Supermarine Spitfire LF.IXe (Apr 1944 – Mar 1945)
- Vickers-Supermarine Spitfire LF.XVIe (Mar 1945 – May 1945)
- Gloster Meteor F.3 (May 1945 – Mar 1948)
- Gloster Meteor F.4 (Dec 1947 – Oct 1950)
- Gloster Meteor T.7 (1950–1957)
- Gloster Meteor F.8 (Oct 1950 – Mar 1957)
- Hawker Hunter F.4 (Mar 1957 – Jan 1958)
- Hawker Hunter F.6 (Nov 1957–1960)
- Hawker Hunter T.7 (1958–1966)
- English Electric Lightning F.1/F.1a (Jun 1960 – Apr 1964)
- English Electric Lightning F.3 (Apr 1964 – Sep 1967)
- English Electric Lightning T.4 (1961–1966)
- English Electric Lightning T.5 (Jun 1967 – Aug 1971)
- English Electric Lightning F.6 (Jun 1966 – Aug 1971)
- McDonnell Douglas F-4J(UK) Phantom (Aug 1984 – Jan 1991)
- McDonnell Douglas Phantom FGR.2 (Jan 1991 – Oct 1992)
- British Aerospace Hawk T.1/T.1A (Oct 1992 – Sep 2000)
A selection of aircraft previously operated by No. 74 Squadron
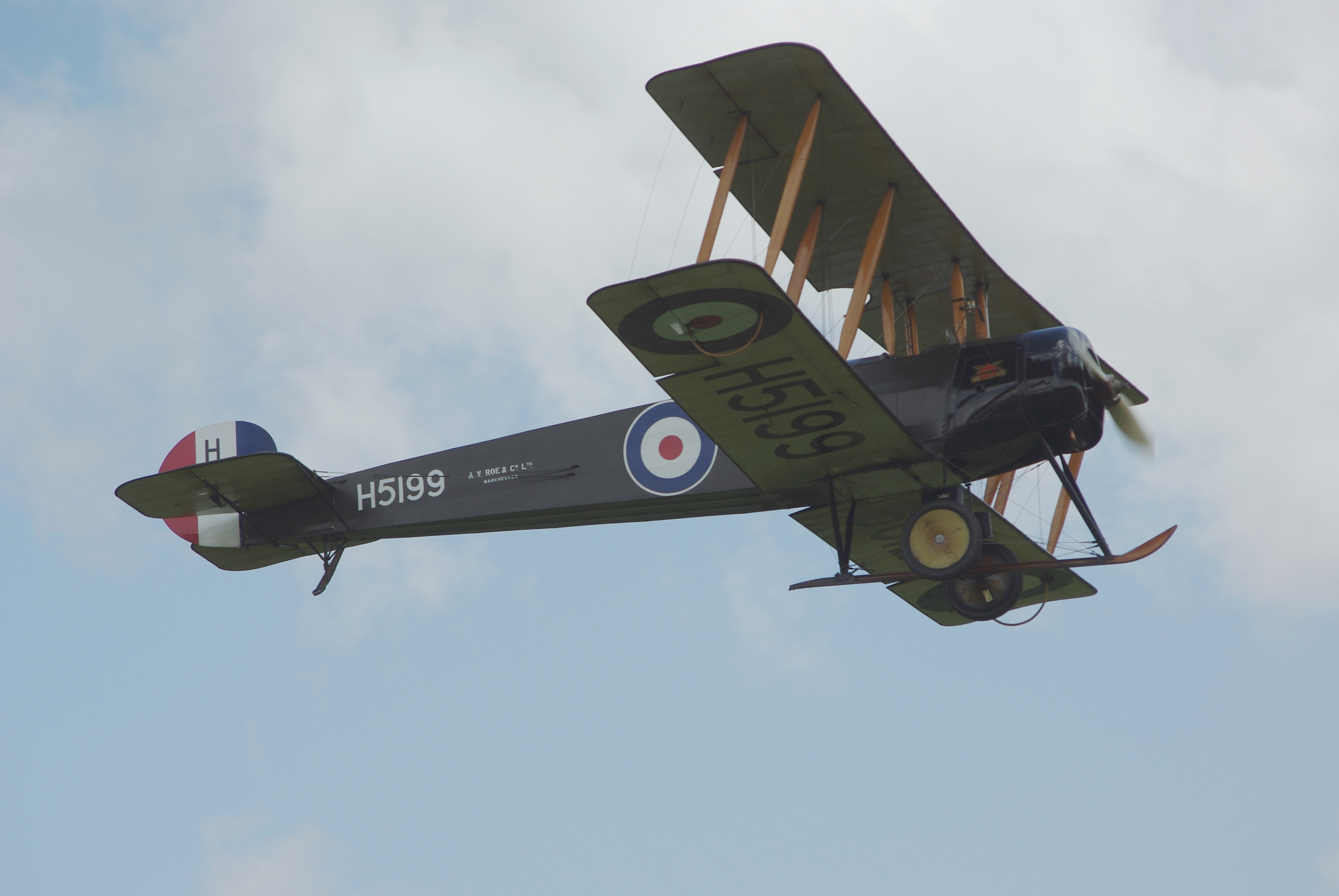
Avro 504K at the Shuttleworth Collection. This was the first aircraft type that No. 74 (Training Depot) Squadron operated in 1917.

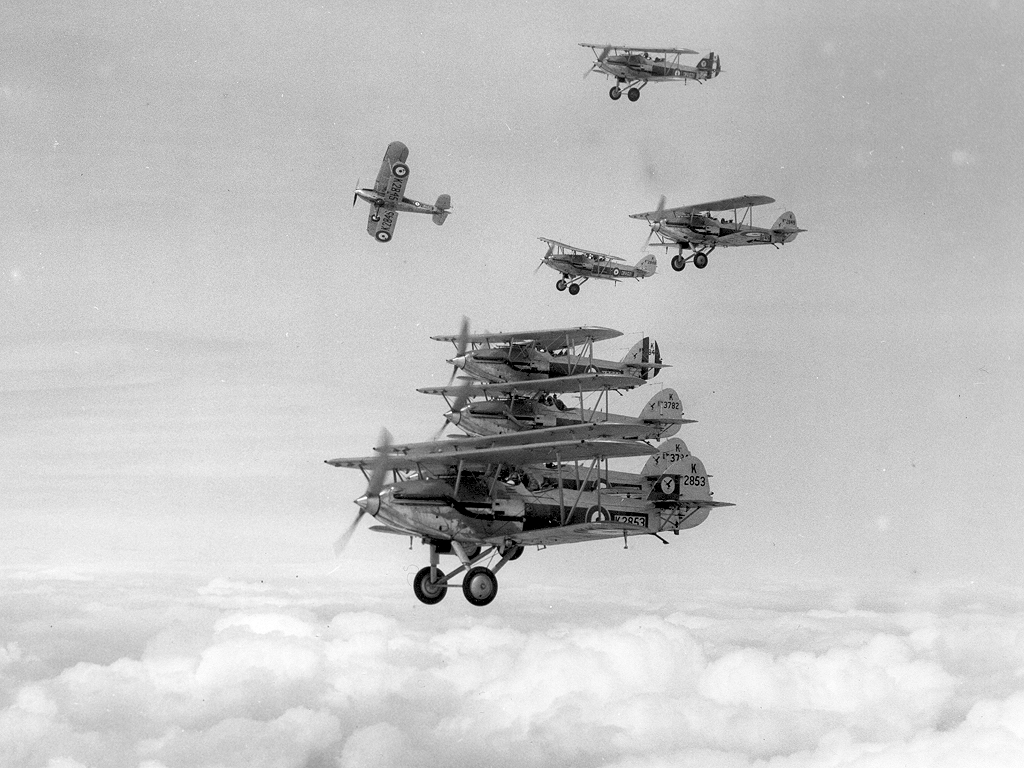
Hawker Demons similar to those No. 74 (F) Squadron operated from 1935 to 1937 in Malta.

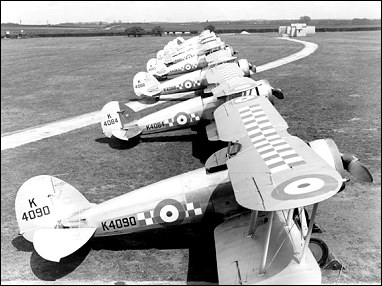
Gloster Gauntlets similar to what No. 74 (F) Squadron flew from 1937 to 1939.

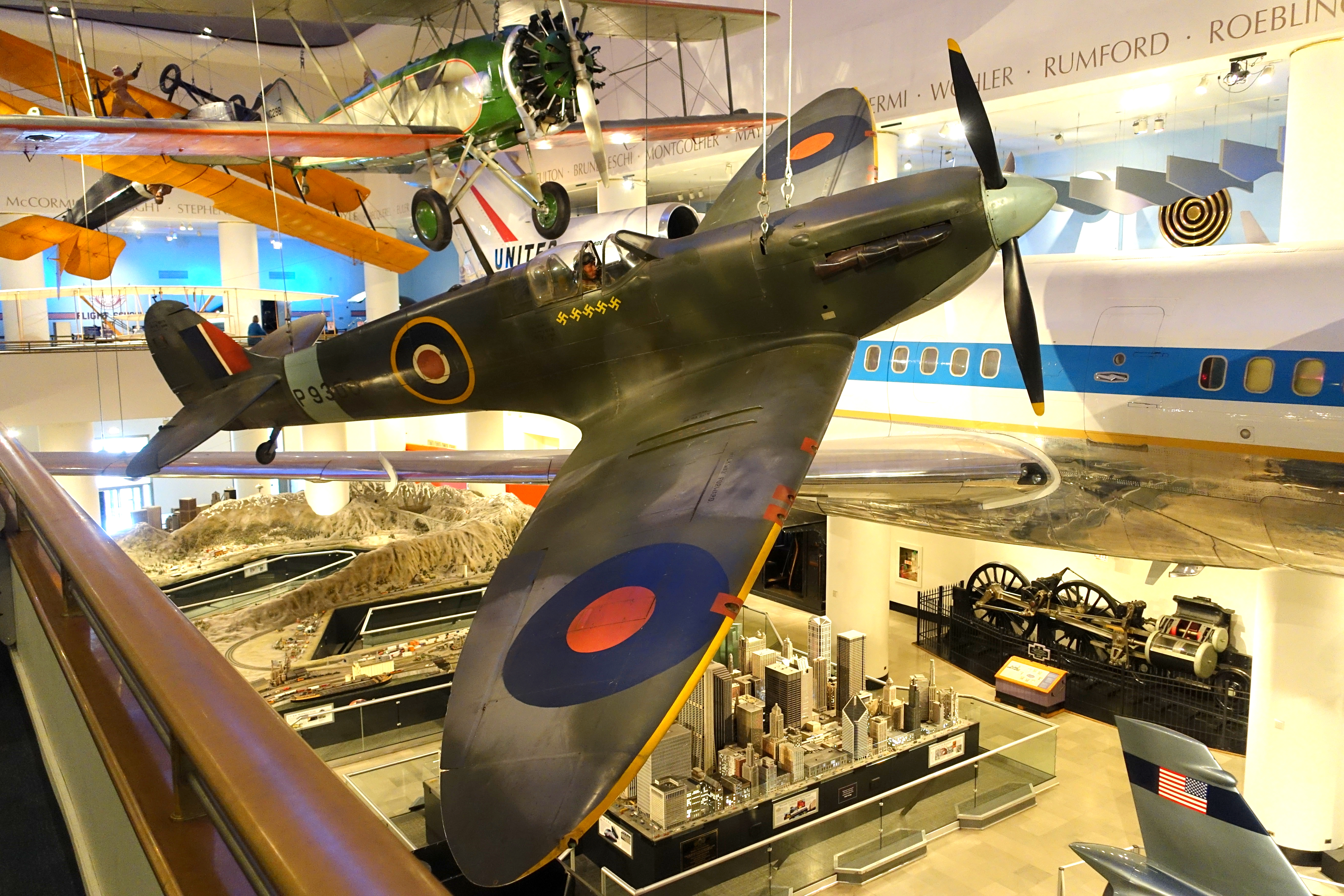
Supermarine Spitfire Mk.Ia P9306, which served with No. 74 (F) Squadron in 1940, on display at the Museum of Science and Industry in Chicago.

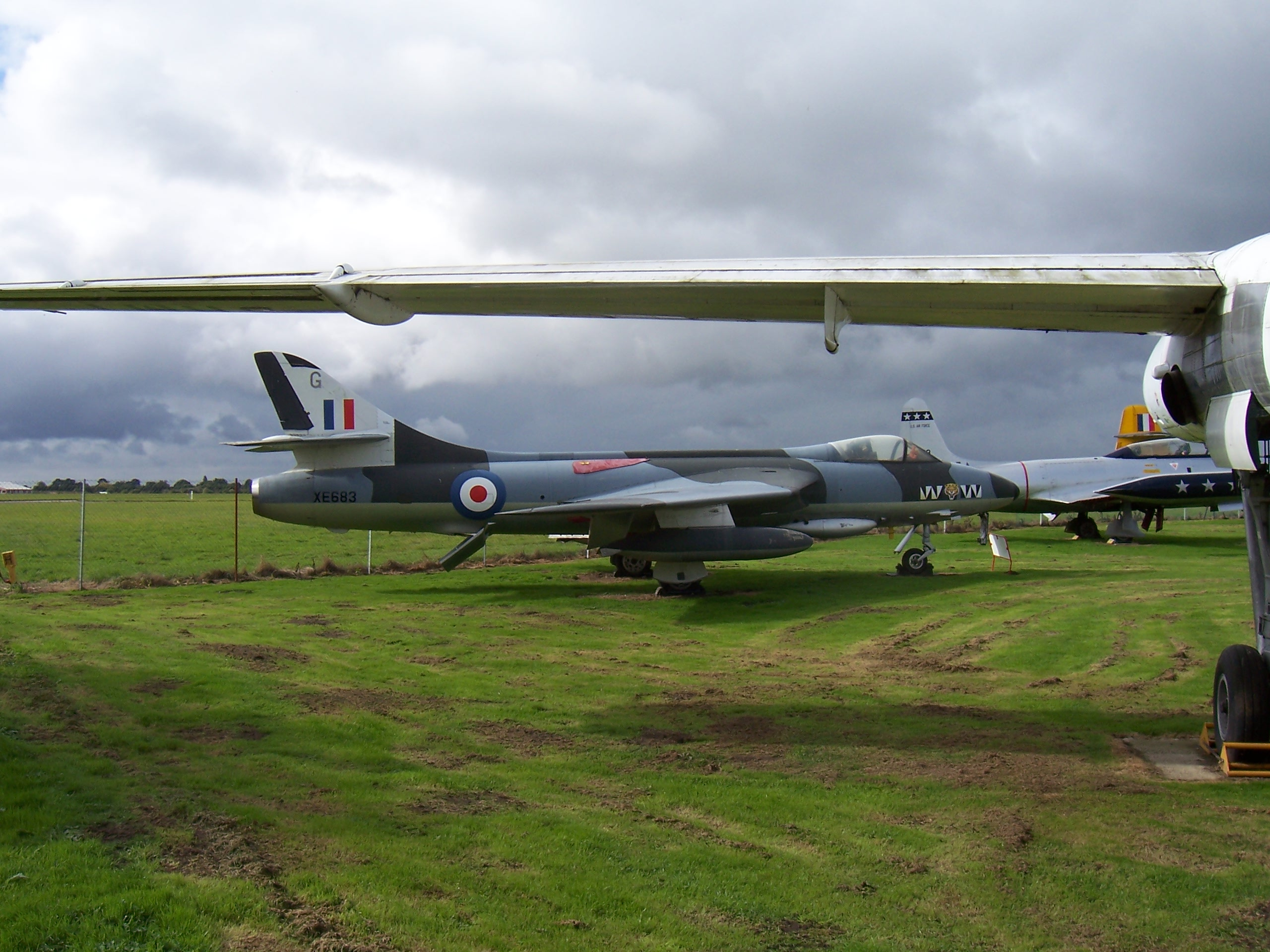
Hawker Hunter Mk.51 painted up as Hunter F.4 XE683 of No. 74 (F) Squadron at the City of Norwich Aviation Museum.

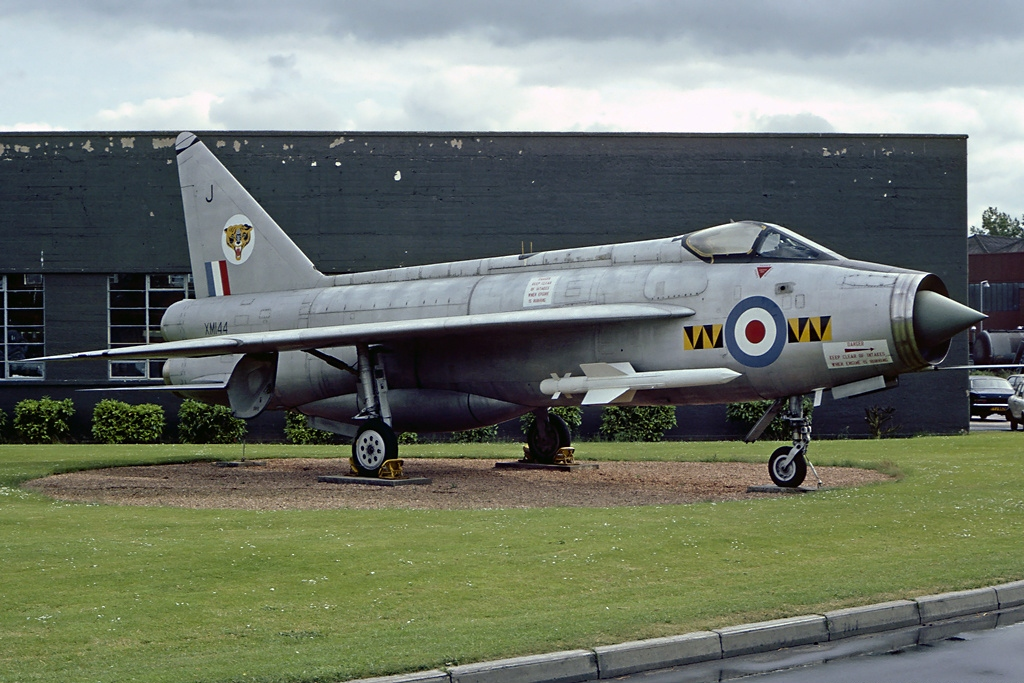
English Electric Lightning of No. 74 (F) at RAF Leuchars.

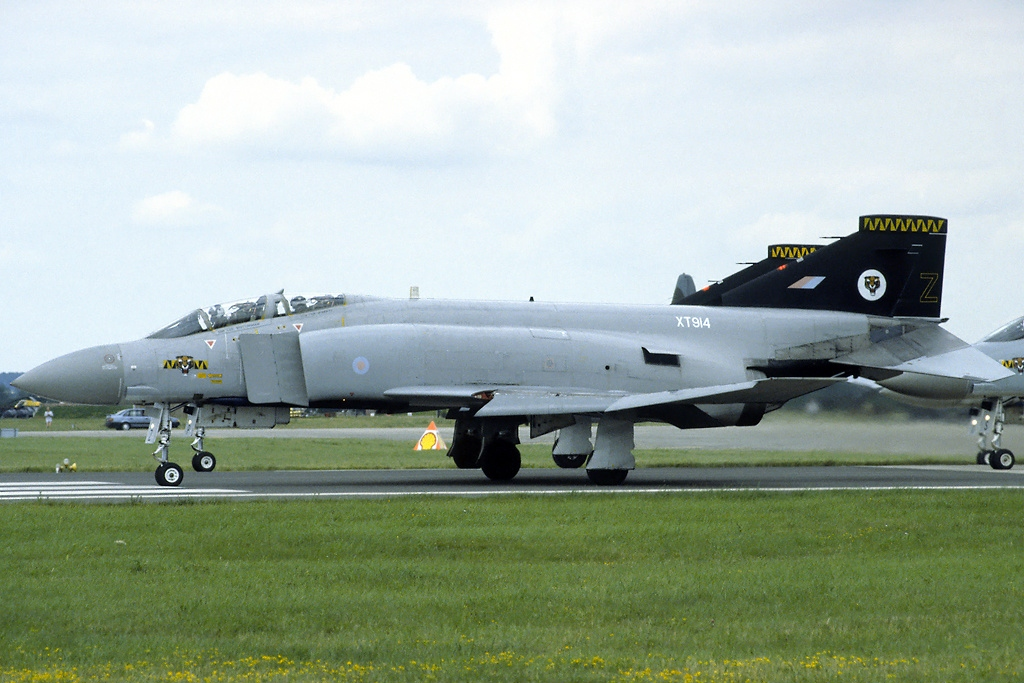
No. 74 (F) Squadron McDonnell Douglas Phantom FGR.2 at RIAT, 1991 (This aircraft is today preserved at Wattisham Airfield.)

== Association ==
The 74 (F) Tiger Squadron Association brings together former Tigers from all generations for a yearly reunion dinner. Pending raising the necessary funds, plans are in place to create a museum dedicated to the squadron's history at their former RAF base of Horsham St. Faith, now Norwich Airport. Since then, plans have been made to create a special section at the City of Norwich Aviation Museum dedicated to the 'Tiger Squadron'. In 2019, the association, along with the British Phantom Aviation Group, acquired F-4J(UK) Phantom ZE360 at the Manston Fire School, with plans to restore it and display it at Cotswold Airport.

== See also ==
- List of RAF squadrons
