= Wilfred Ernest Young =

English World War I flying ace

- Born: 28 December 1891; Dorchester, Dorset, England
- Military career
- Allegiance: United Kingdom
- Branch: British Army; Royal Air Force
- Service years: 1915–1920
- Rank: Major
- Units: No. 19 Squadron RFC; No. 74 Squadron RAF
- Conflicts: World War I
- Awards: Distinguished Flying Cross

Major Wilfred Ernest Young DFC was an English World War I flying ace credited with 11 confirmed aerial victories.

== Early life and service ==
Wilfred Ernest Young was born in Bournemouth, England on 28 December 1891. He began his military service as a second lieutenant in the 3rd Battalion, Dorsetshire Regiment, on 30 June 1915. On 15 December, he was posted to No. 6 Squadron RAF.

== World War I aerial service ==
=== First tour of duty ===
On 13 June 1916, Young was seconded from the Dorsetshires to the Royal Flying Corps as an aerial observer flying officer. He was returned to Home Establishment in England on 12 August 1916. On 1 January 1917, Young was rewarded with a probationary promotion from second lieutenant to temporary captain when he was appointed a Flight Commander. This first tour of combat duty began on 5 June 1917 as a Spad pilot with 19 Squadron. He was credited with three victories during June and July 1917, sharing one with William Cairnes and two other pilots. On 1 July 1917, he was promoted from second lieutenant to lieutenant. On 22 July 1917, he was wounded in action. He would not return to duty until March 1918, when he was appointed Flight Commander in No. 74 Squadron RAF.

=== Second tour of duty ===
Young's second tour of combat duty, as a Royal Aircraft Factory SE.5a pilot, was with "Mick" Mannock's 74 Squadron. Young would share a brace of victories with the highly esteemed Mannock during the former's run of eight wins with the squadron. Young's first win for 74 Squadron–his fourth overall–came on 12 April 1918 when he destroyed an enemy Albatros D.III west of Armentières, France. By 9 July 1918, when he shared his last victory over Merris with his flight, he had totaled 11 wins. He had burned two Pfalz D.IIIs into ruins; he had also destroyed seven others, including two that were shared with Mannock, Andrew Kiddie, Harris George Clements, and five other pilots. Young had also shared in driving down two enemy reconnaissance planes down out of control.

On 2 July 1918, just before his last victory, Young was awarded the Distinguished Flying Cross, which was gazetted on 3 August 1918. On 4 August 1918, Captain Young was appointed a temporary major while he was so employed. He was appointed to command No. 1 Squadron RAF.

== Post World War I ==
On 1 April 1920, he relinquished his commission, keeping his honorary rank of lieutenant.
