= James Hayter (RAF officer) =

New Zealander flying ace

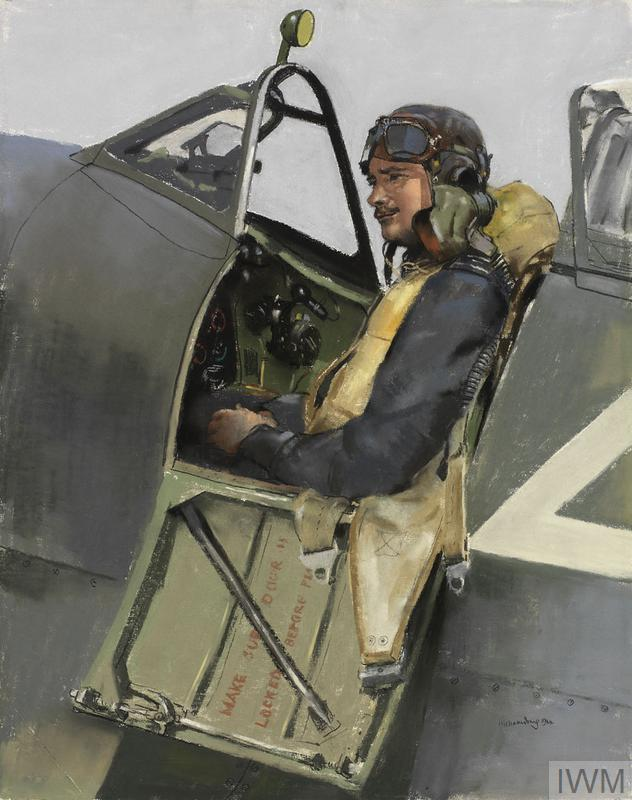
- Portrait of James Hayter, sitting in the cockpit of a Supermarine Spitfire fighter, painted by William Dring in 1944
- Born: 18 October 1917; Timaru, New Zealand
- Died: 3 October 2006 (aged 88); Tākaka, New Zealand
- Military career
- Allegiance: New Zealand
- Branch: Royal New Zealand Air Force; Royal Air Force
- Service years: 1938–1939; 1944–1945 (RNZAF); 1939–1944 (RAF)
- Rank: Squadron Leader
- Commands: No. 74 Squadron; No. 274 Squadron
- Conflicts: Second World War; Battle of France; Battle of Britain; Channel Front; Dodecanese campaign; Western Front
- Awards: Distinguished Flying Cross & Bar; Mention in despatches (2)

James Chilton Francis Hayter, DFC & Bar (18 October 1917 – 3 October 2006) was a New Zealand flying ace of the Royal Air Force (RAF) during the Second World War. He was officially credited with at least five aerial victories.

Born in Timaru, Hayter joined the Royal New Zealand Air Force (RNZAF) in November 1938 and on completing his flight training was sent to the United Kingdom. In 1939 he transferred to the RAF and served with No. 103 Squadron during the Battle of France, flying Fairey Battle light bombers. He volunteered for Fighter Command and flew Hawker Hurricane fighters with No. 605 Squadron during the Battle of Britain and then on the Channel Front in early 1941. Later in the year he served as an instructor before joining No. 601 Squadron. Awarded the Distinguished Flying Cross (DFC) in October, he was dispatched to the Middle East in March 1942. There he served with No. 33 Squadron before being given command of No. 274 Squadron, which he led until September.

After a period on attachment to the Turkish Air Force as an instructor, Hayter returned to duty with the RAF when he took command of No. 74 Squadron in April 1943. It operated in the eastern end of the Mediterranean Sea, including during the failed Dodecanese campaign. The squadron returned to the United Kingdom in April 1944 and served with the Second Tactical Air Force during the campaign in Northwest Europe. Hayter, having transferred to the RNZAF, relinquished command at the end of the year. He was repatriated to New Zealand in September 1945 and released from the RNZAF. In civilian life he took up farming and later became a mariner. He died at Tākaka in 2006, at the age of 88.

== Early life ==
James Chilton Francis Hayter, the son of H. Hayter, a farmer, was born in Timaru, New Zealand, on 18 October 1917 and was educated at Nelson College. On completing his schooling, he commenced working on his father's farm, which was on D'Urville Island in the Marlborough Sounds. He subsequently worked as a roustabout on other farms and stations in the Marlborough region. In his spare time, he received tuition in flying at the Marlborough Aero Club and upon deciding to pursue a career in military aviation, joined the Royal New Zealand Air Force (RNZAF) on a short-service commission in 1938. His initial training, which commenced in November, was at No. 1 Flying Training School at Wigram. He gained his wings on 19 April 1939.

Hayter was involved in a crash when a Vickers Vildebeest light bomber, in which he was an observer, made a forced-landing at Wigram on 8 May. Uninjured, he was in another crash, flying again as an observer in a Vildebeest, the following month when the pilot flew too low over Lake Ellesmere and crashed, Hayter receiving minor injuries. His flight training was completed in June and the following month he left New Zealand, traveling on the SS Tamaroa, for the United Kingdom. He was to serve with the Royal Air Force (RAF) and was granted a short-service commission as a pilot officer with effect from 16 August 1939. Hayter was posted to No. 98 Squadron, which was based at Hucknall equipped with Fairey Battle light bombers. Following the outbreak of the Second World War, the squadron was used as a reinforcement unit, training and distributing pilots to serve with operational squadrons. Hayter had another crash, this time as the pilot, when he flew his Battle into an air-raid shelter.

== Second World War ==
In November 1939, Hayter was posted to No. 103 Squadron, one of ten Bomber Command squadrons sent to France as part of the Advanced Air Striking Force (AASF). Based at Plivot and operating Battles, the squadron mainly served in a reconnaissance role over the French–German border and also flew leaflet drops into Germany. On 10 May, Germany commenced its invasion of France and the Low Countries and two days later Hayter flew on his first bombing raid, against a pontoon bridge over the Meuse River. Despite the intervention of Messerschmitt Bf 110 heavy fighters, he was successful. A large mass raid mounted by the AASF on the afternoon of 14 May, directed at German forces near Sedan, saw many casualties among the attackers such that the Battles, slow with limited range and armament, were rarely used in significant numbers again. The next day, No. 103 Squadron abandoned its base and flew south to St Lucien Ferme near Rhèges.

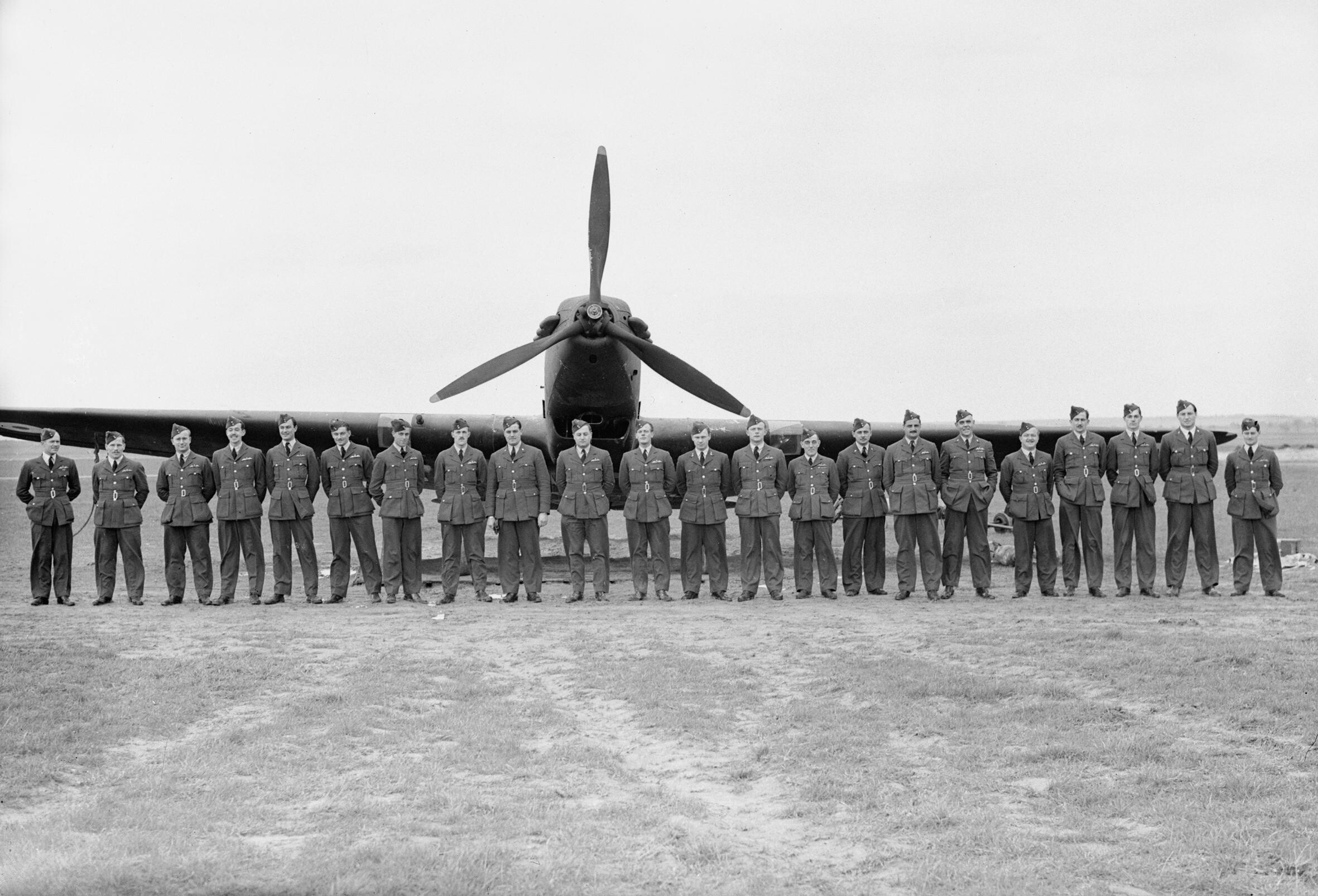
Officers of No. 103 Squadron in front of a Fairey Battle at Betheniville; Hayter stands at far right

The bomber squadrons in France continued to harry the German advance, attacking transport and advancing troops. On 12 June, Hayter and his air gunner engaged a Henschel Hs 126 reconnaissance aircraft over northern France. Despite the Hs 126 apparently crashing, Hayter did not claim it and it was subsequently confirmed as being destroyed by the French. While attempting to land at his airfield on 16 June, Hayter was shot down by a Messerschmitt Bf 109 fighter. Unharmed, he and the rest of the squadron were withdrawn to England just hours later as France was about to surrender. He subsequently volunteered to transfer to Fighter Command. Promoted to flying officer on 3 September, the next day he was transferred to No. 615 Squadron, a fighter squadron then resting at Prestwick in Scotland and training replacement pilots after being heavily engaged in the Battle of Britain. After two weeks, he was posted to No. 605 Squadron.

=== Battle of Britain ===
No. 605 Squadron was stationed at Croydon, operating Hawker Hurricane fighters to intercept Luftwaffe raids against London. It regularly was on patrol over Kent and Surrey for the next weeks and on 15 October, Hayter damaged a Bf 109 over Canterbury. He met and damaged another Bf 109 while patrolling south of Mayfield on 26 October. He was later shot down over Maidstone. He baled out of his burning Hurricane and landed in the grounds of the home of Victor Cazalet, a member of parliament, who was hosting a party. Hayter was slightly wounded but a doctor present treated his injuries and he joined in the festivities while waiting for his fiancée, who lived nearby and he later married, to pick him up. The intensity of the Luftwaffe's operations was on the decline at this stage and the Battle of Britain ended a few days later. In November, the squadron began receiving new Hurricane Mk IIs and flying one of these, Hayter destroyed a Bf 109 to the south west of Canterbury on 1 December.

=== Channel Front ===
In early 1941, Fighter Command went on to the offensive and No. 605 Squadron began to fly operations over France. Its first such operation was on 10 February, when it escorted Bristol Blenheim light bombers to Boulogne. Later in the month Hayter was appointed a flight commander and was promoted to acting flight lieutenant. At the end of the month, the squadron was rested and sent to Martlesham Heath for a month, before moving again, this to Tern Hill where it stayed until May. By this time Hayter had flown on 150 sorties and was posted to instructing duties at No. 52 Operational Training Unit at Debden. Although intended to be a rest, being an instructor still came with risk and in June, Hayter crashed twice in three days when his pupil, the same on both occasions, froze when landing a North American Harvard trainer.

Hayter was posted to No. 611 Squadron, which was operating Supermarine Spitfire fighters from Hornchurch, in July. His new unit regularly flew bomber escort missions and sweeps to France and on one of these, carried out on 10 July, Hayter shot down a Bf 109. His Spitfire was damaged by anti-aircraft fire later on in the flight and he had to crash land near Southend. Four days later, he destroyed another Bf 109 to the south of Boulogne and on 29 August shot down a Bf 109 over England. In early September his flight lieutenant rank was made substantive. He damaged a Bf 109 to the east of Mardyck on 17 September. The following month, he was awarded the Distinguished Flying Cross (DFC), the announcement being made on 17 October in The London Gazette.

Since June 1941, this officer has completed 48 operational flights over enemy territory and during the period has destroyed 4 and damaged a further 4 hostile aircraft. Flight Lieutenant Hayter participated in the fighting in France in 1940 and later fought in the Battle of Britain. He has displayed great skill and leadership and has contributed materially to the high standard of morale in his unit.

— London Gazette, No. 35312, 17 October 1941

=== Middle East ===
In November, No. 611 Squadron was rested, relocating to Drem for a quiet period of convoy patrols. Hayter, by this time having completed 76 sorties with the squadron, was transferred to the Middle East in March 1942. He was posted to No. 33 Squadron, based at Gambut in Libya and equipped with Hurricanes. The squadron was carrying out sweeps, bomber escort sorties and patrols over the front line. In June, Hayter was engaged by an Italian Macchi MC.202 and in the ensuing dogfight, his Hurricane was damaged. In endeavouring to make a crash landing, he found himself with the opportunity to fire his aircraft's machine-guns at his Italian opponent. As a result, the MC.202 had to crash land as well, with its pilot being made a prisoner of war by Australian soldiers. He and Hayter reportedly shared a drink that night in the Australian lines.

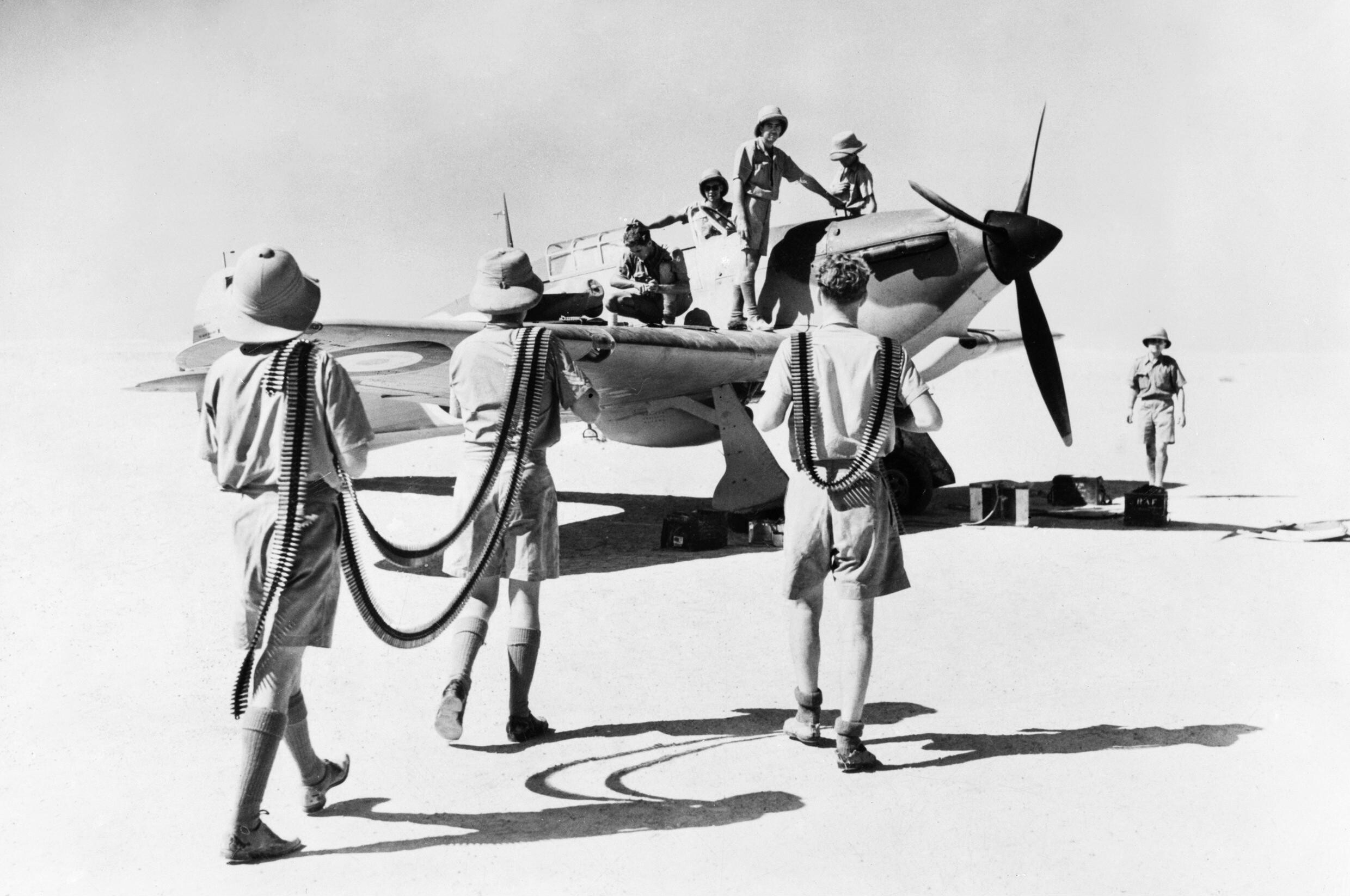
A Hawker Hurricane of No. 33 Squadron being rearmed, Egypt

The following month, Hayter was promoted to acting squadron leader and appointed commander of No. 274 Squadron, a squadron operating Hurricane fighter-bombers from Landing Ground 92. By this time, the Axis advance in Egypt had been halted and the Allied fighter squadrons were busy on ground attack and patrol sorties around El Alamein. On 10 July, Hayter's squadron was providing air cover for another unit and became involved in a dogfight with group of Italian fighters near El Adem and he claimed one MC.202 as probably destroyed. He shot down a Bf 109 over El Alamein on 18 July.

In September, No. 274 Squadron moved to Edku and was engaged in patrolling the Delta region and providing air cover for shipping. The following month, Hayter was seconded for special duties, with effect from 4 October and sent to Turkey. Here he acted as an instructor for Turkish pilots learning to operate the Hurricane and P-40 Kittyhawk fighters. His secondment ended on 6 March 1943 and he took command of No. 74 Squadron, based in Mehrabad, in Iran, as part of the Allied garrison defending the region from a possible German attack from the Caucasus.

Hayter's command moved to El Daba in May and patrolled the area around Alexandria without seeing much action. On 23 July, Hayter led a flight of the squadron as part of a large fighter sweep, involving over 100 aircraft, to German-occupied Crete. During this sortie, the first of its size mounted against the island, Hayter's flight attacked a number of ground targets and returned to their base without loss. No. 74 Squadron continued to be involved in the occasional offensive sweep in combination with its patrolling duties until the end of August, at which time it re-equipped with the Spitfire Mk Vc.

The following month, No. 74 Squadron participated in the Dodecanese campaign, an attempt to seize the Italian-controlled Dodecanese islands in the Aegean Sea. Hayter flew the squadron to operate from Antimachia airfield on Kos Island. On 3 October the Germans invaded Kos and by the afternoon had overrun the airfield. Abandoning their Spitfires, Hayter and a number of other pilots took to nearby hills. They evaded the pursuing Germans for four days before being rescued by personnel of the Special Boat Service who took them to Cyprus on a fishing boat. Hayter returned to Edku on 24 October but it was not until nearly the end of the year that No. 74 Squadron was complete again. He was mentioned in despatches on 14 January 1944 for his efforts to evade capture on Kos. Once it had been re-built, No. 74 Squadron resumed uneventful patrolling duties for the next three months, most of which was spent at Ekdu and Dekhelia.

=== Return to Europe ===
In April 1944, No. 74 Squadron was dispatched to the United Kingdom and settled at North Weald, where it converted to the latest Spitfire Mk LF.IXe. It became operational the following month and was engaged in sweeps, patrols and bomber escort duties as part of the North Weald Wing. Hayter was again mentioned in despatches on 8 June, for "distinguished service". A few days afterwards his squadron commenced flying in Operation Diver, where it patrolled for V-1 flying bombs and sought out the sites from which the rockets were launched. On 1 July Hayter's rank of squadron leader was made substantive.

Later in July, No. 74 Squadron was transferred to the Second Tactical Air Force, flying bomber escort missions. It began operating from France, based at Sommervieu on 19 August and thereafter often worked in support of the advancing Allied armies, attacking ground targets but also still acting in an escort role for bombers. By this time his short service commission in the RAF had ended and he transferred to the RNZAF.

Hayter relinquished command of No. 74 Squadron at the end of December, by which time it was based at Antwerp and returned to the United Kingdom. Awarded a bar to his DFC in January 1945 for his services with the squadron, he took a course at the Fighter Leaders' School at the Central Fighter Establishment at Milfield and by June was preparing for a return to New Zealand. He eventually departed the United Kingdom in mid-August. Hayter ended the war having flown 535 sorties, during which he was credited with shooting down five aircraft, one probably destroyed and three damaged. There was also another aircraft destroyed which he did not claim.

== Later life ==
Arriving in New Zealand in late September 1945, Hayter was transferred to the Reserve of Officers at the end of the year. In civilian life, he took up farming but by the 1960s found the work increasingly difficult due to his war injuries. Following operations on his back and having sold his farm, he became a mariner. He worked on a survey ship in Australia, Singapore and South America and subsequently gained a master's certificate. He then worked in the shipping industry in the United States.

Returning to New Zealand in 1973, he again took up farming but four years later became the manager of a camping ground. In 1978, he was found guilty of cultivating cannabis on his property in Golden Bay, despite claiming his innocence. At his sentencing, he was fined $500. He later worked in property development in Tākaka. He died on 3 October 2006 at Tākaka and is buried at Wakapuaka Cemetery in Nelson.
