= Andrew Kiddie =

South African World War I flying ace (1889–1964)

Andrew Cameron Kiddie
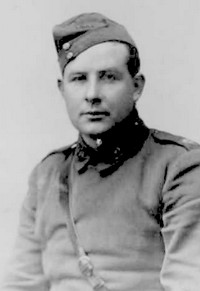
- Born: 7 November 1889; Kimberley, Cape Colony
- Died: 27 June 1964 (aged 74)
- Military career
- Allegiance: Union of South Africa
- Branch: Royal Flying Corps
- Rank: Captain
- Units: 18th South African Mounted Rifles; No. 32 Squadron RFC; No. 74 Squadron RAF
- Awards: Distinguished Flying Cross (United Kingdom); Belgian Croix de guerre

Captain Andrew Cameron Kiddie (1889 – 1964) was a World War I flying ace credited with 15 aerial victories.

== Early service ==
After serving with the 18th South African Mounted Rifles, Kiddie betook himself to England to join the Royal Flying Corps. Kiddie was appointed second lieutenant on probation as of 1 August 1916. He was confirmed as second lieutenant on 31 October 1916. He was assigned to No. 32 Squadron RFC in early 1917; while flying an Airco DH.5, he scored his first victory on 20 July 1917. Later that year, he was transferred to Home Establishment as an instructor. One of the students he trained was Ira Jones.

== Service as a fighter pilot ==
Kiddie was transferred back to combat duty with No. 74 Squadron RAF in early 1918; the squadron moved its Royal Aircraft Factory SE.5as to France in March 1918. His squadron mates included Ira Jones and "Mick" Mannock; the three of them started their careers as aces at roughly the same time. Kiddie scored his second victory on 3 May 1918, sharing it with Mannock, Henry Dolan, and Harris Clements. Five days later, he was the only survivor from his flight of six when they engaged ten Fokker Dr.I triplanes. Kiddie then became a balloon buster on 19 May 1918. Thereafter, he reeled off an even dozen triumphs over enemy planes; all but one were over enemy fighters. His final tally was a balloon and ten airplanes destroyed, four of which were shared, and four enemy airplanes driven down out of control.

== Honors and awards ==
Distinguished Flying Cross

Lieut. (A. Capt.) Andrew Cameron Kiddie. (France.)—"A gallant officer, who has proved himself resolute and courageous in aerial combats. He has to his credit six enemy machines and one balloon shot down in flames."

Belgian Croix de guerre awarded 15 July 1919.
