= Sydney Carlin (RAF officer) =

British World War I flying ace

- Born: 1889; Kingston upon Hull, Yorkshire, England
- Died: 9 May 1941 (aged 51–52); Peterborough, Soke of Peterborough, England
- Military career
- Allegiance: United Kingdom
- Branch: British Army; Royal Air Force
- Service years: 1908–1909; 1915–1924; 1940–1941
- Rank: Pilot Officer
- Nickname: Timbertoes
- Units: 18th Royal Hussars; Royal Engineers; No. 74 Squadron RFC; No. 264 Squadron RAF; No. 151 Squadron RAF
- Conflicts: World War I; Battle of the Somme; World War II; Battle of Britain
- Awards: Military Cross; Distinguished Flying Cross; Distinguished Conduct Medal

Sydney "Timbertoes" Carlin, MC, DFC, DCM (1889 – 9 May 1941) was a British flying ace of the First World War, despite having previously lost a leg during the Battle of the Somme. He returned to the Royal Air Force in the Second World War, serving as an air gunner during the Battle of Britain.

== Early life ==
Sydney Carlin was born in Kingston upon Hull, Yorkshire, the son of William Carlin, a drysalter. By 1901 he was a boarder at a small private school in the village of Soulby, Kirkby Stephen, Westmorland. He enlisted with the 18th Hussars (later the 18th Royal Hussars) in 1908, but he bought himself out and resigned in December 1909 for the sum of £18. In 1911 he was working as a farm labourer at Frodingham Grange, North Frodingham, Yorkshire.

== First World War ==
Just over a year after the British entry into the First World War, Carlin re-enlisted on 8 August 1915; the army refunded half (£9) of the money he had bought himself out with in 1909. Serving in Belgium with the 18th Royal Hussars, he was awarded the Distinguished Conduct Medal on 5 August 1915, and was later commissioned as a second lieutenant in September 1915. He was promoted to lieutenant in May 1916. Carlin lost a leg in the Battle of Longueval/Delville Wood, on the Somme in 1916, while commanding a Royal Engineers Field Company section holding a trench against repeated German counter-attacks. For this action he was awarded the Military Cross in October.

Carlin joined the Royal Flying Corps (RFC) in 1917, following his recovery. On 12 March 1918, Carlin was seconded from the Royal Engineers to the RFC. After serving as an instructor at the Central Flying School, he was posted in May 1918 to No. 74 Squadron RAF flying S.E.5As, where he earned his nickname "Timbertoes". Carlin is recorded as an ace balloon buster, with five balloons downed; he was also an ace against aircraft, with four machines claimed destroyed, and one aircraft 'driven down out of control'. His exploits earned him the Distinguished Flying Cross.

On 9 August 1918, Carlin was promoted to temporary captain. In early September he was involved in a mid-air collision with his commanding officer, Major Keith Caldwell, but was relatively unscathed. On 21 September Carlin was shot down over Hantay by Unteroffizier Siegfried Westphal of Jasta 29 and held as a prisoner of war. He was repatriated on 13 December 1918 and admitted to the RAF Central Hospital on Christmas Day 1918. Carlin relinquished his commission on "account of ill-health contracted on active service" on 7 August 1919, and retained the rank of lieutenant.

== Inter-war years ==
On 1 January 1924 Carlin was promoted from flight lieutenant to squadron leader. Nevertheless, in 1924, Carlin departed Britain for Mombasa aboard the SS Madura. He was listed on the passenger list as an "agriculturist". He farmed for some years in Kenya.

From 20 May 1931 to 8 August 1935 Carlin served as the justice of the peace for Kisumu-Londiani District, Kenya.

== Second World War ==
On re-enlistment to the RAF, Carlin was graded as a probationary pilot officer on 27 July 1940, almost eleven months after the outbreak of the Second World War. He made pilot officer in September 1940, flying as an air gunner in Boulton Paul Defiant aircraft with No. 264 Squadron RAF and later No. 151 Squadron RAF. He also made several unofficial trips as an air gunner with No. 311 (Czech) Squadron, flying Wellingtons.

Carlin was wounded in action at RAF Wittering during an enemy bombing raid on 7/8 May 1941, and died in Peterborough on 9 May 1941. He is commemorated on the Screen Wall, Panel 1, at Hull Crematorium.
