= Frederick Stanley Gordon =

New Zealand flying ace

- Born: 29 October 1897; Auckland, New Zealand
- Died: 27 July 1985 (aged 87); Cromwell, New Zealand
- Military career
- Allegiance: New Zealand
- Branch: New Zealand Expeditionary Force; Royal Air Force; Royal New Zealand Air Force
- Rank: Lieutenant
- Nickname: "Freddie"
- Unit: No. 74 Squadron RAF
- Conflicts: First World War
- Awards: Distinguished Flying Cross; Croix de guerre (Belgium)

Frederick Stanley Gordon, DFC (29 October 1897 – 27 July 1985) was a New Zealand flying ace of the First World War. While serving in Britain's Royal Air Force, he scored nine aerial victories as a fighter pilot.

== Early life ==
Frederick Stanley Gordon was born in New Zealand on 29 October 1897.

== First World War ==
Gordon served in the Royal Air Force. By mid-1918, he was assigned to No. 74 Squadron as a fighter pilot. He began a nine victory winning streak on 2 August 1918 that was capped with his second ballon busting mission on 30 October. Gordon was awarded the Distinguished Flying Cross on 3 June 1919, and the Belgian Croix de guerre on 15 July.

== List of aerial victories ==
No.	Date/time	Aircraft	Foe	Result	Location	Notes
1	2 August 1918 @ 0930 hours	Royal Aircraft Factory SE.5a serial number D3438	LVG reconnaissance plane	Captured	Dickebusch	Victory shared with George Gauld
2	16 August 1918 @ 0830 hours	Royal Aircraft Factory SE.5a s/n D3438	Fokker D.VII	Destroyed	Messines	
3	16 August 1918 @ 0830 hours	Royal Aircraft Factory SE.5a s/n D3438	Fokker D.VII	Driven down out of control	Messines	
4	16 August 1918 @ 1250 hours	Royal Aircraft Factory SE.5a s/n D3438	Rumpler reconnaissance plane	Destroyed	East of Kemmel Hill	Victory shared with Harold Goodman Shoemaker
5	22 August 1918 @ 0550 hours	Royal Aircraft Factory SE.5a s/n D3438	LVG reconnaissance plane	Driven down out of control	Estaires	
6	4 September 1918 @ 0805 hours	Royal Aircraft Factory SE.5a s/n E1978	Observation balloon	Destroyed	South of Roulers	
7	28 October 1918 @ 1445 hours	Royal Aircraft Factory SE.5a	Fokker D.VII	Destroyed	Northwest of Wortegem	Victory shared with Andrew Kiddie Gordon and another pilot
8	28 October 1918 @ 1450 hours	Royal Aircraft Factory SE.5a	Fokker D.VII	Driven down out of control	Wortegem	
9	30 October 1918 @ 0830 hours	Royal Aircraft Factory SE.5a	Observation balloon	Destroyed	Quaremont	

== Post-war ==
Gordon died on 27 June 1985.
