= Clive Glynn =

British WWI flying ace

Clive Beverley Glynn
- Born: 9 April 1893; Liverpool, Lancashire, England
- Died: 4 December 1946 (aged 53); Cullompton, Devon, England
- Burial place: Cullompton Cemetery, Cullompton, Devon
- Military career
- Allegiance: United Kingdom
- Branch: British Army; Royal Air Force
- Service years: 1914–1919; 1939–1941
- Rank: Captain
- Units: 10th (Scottish) Battalion, Liverpool Regiment; No. 56 Squadron RFC; No. 74 Squadron RAF
- Conflicts: World War I World War II
- Awards: Distinguished Flying Cross

Captain Clive Beverley Glynn DFC (9 April 1893 – 4 December 1946) was a British soldier of the First World War, who entered the infantry as a private. After being commissioned as an officer, he transferred into the Royal Flying Corps, trained as a fighter pilot, and became a flying ace credited with eight aerial victories. Although he returned to military service in May 1939 before the start of the Second World War, his service was truncated by ill health in 1941.

== Early life ==
Clive Beverley Glynn was born in Liverpool, Lancashire. He was the tenth of eleven children born to the noted physician Dr. Thomas Robinson Glynn , FRCP, MRCS (1841–1931), Professor of Medicine at Liverpool University from 1884, who had six children with his first wife, Octavia de Paiva, before marrying Clive's mother, Alice Lewtas Griffin in 1885, and fathering five more. Clive Glynn had three older step-brothers and three older step-sisters; he also had two elder sisters and an elder brother, as well as a younger one.

== World War I ==
Glynn served originally in the 10th (Scottish) Battalion, Liverpool Regiment; he was raised from the ranks, being promoted from private to second lieutenant on 17 November 1914. He was promoted to lieutenant on 4 December 1914, and was appointed an acting-captain on 12 May 1915, serving as adjutant until 14 November. He applied for transfer to the Royal Flying Corps, and on 10 May 1917 was seconded from the Liverpool Regiment to the Royal Flying Corps with the rank of second lieutenant to serve as a flying officer, having relinquished his acting rank. However, on 31 May 1917 he was promoted to captain in his regiment with precedence from 1 June 1916.

After completing pilot training, he was posted to No. 56 Squadron RFC on 17 June 1917. He did not serve there long, being returned to Britain for additional training. He was reassigned, being posted to No. 74 Squadron RFC. He returned to France with this squadron, landing on the Western Front in early 1918. He scored his first aerial victory with them on 29 April, just after the RFC became part of the RAF. On 1 June he was appointed an acting-captain to serve as a flight commander in the squadron.

Glynn was awarded the Distinguished Flying Cross after his double victory on 1 October 1918, although it was not gazetted until 3 December 1918. His citation read:

Distinguished Flying Cross
Lieutenant (Acting-Captain) Clive Beverley Glynn (Liverpool Regiment).

This officer has shown remarkable skill and bravery in aerial combat, never hesitating to attack, without regard to disparity of numbers. He has accounted for four machines—two in one flight.

== Combat record ==
List of aerial victories
No.	Date/time	Aircraft	Foe	Result	Location	Notes
1	29 April 1918 @ 1140 hours	Royal Aircraft Factory SE.5a	Fokker Triplane	Destroyed	South of Dickebusch Lake	Heinrich Bongartz wounded and shot down
2	26 May 1918 @ 0720 hours	Royal Aircraft Factory SE.5a	Pfalz D.III	Driven down out of control	Southeast of Bailleul	
3	23 August 1918 @ 1905 hours	Royal Aircraft Factory SE.5a	Fokker D.VII	Driven down out of control	Passendale, Belgium	
4	25 August 1918 @ 1845 hours	Royal Aircraft Factory SE.5a	Fokker D.VII	Destroyed	Warneton, France	
5	21 September 1918 @ 1845 hours	Royal Aircraft Factory SE.5a	Fokker D.VII	Destroyed	Lille, France	
6	1 October 1918 @ 1400 hours	Royal Aircraft Factory SE.5a	Fokker D.VII	Destroyed	Between Kortrijk and Roeselare, Belgium	Combat cited in DFC award citation
7	1 October 1918 @ 1400 hours	Royal Aircraft Factory SE.5a	Fokker D.VII	Set afire in midair; destroyed	Between Kortrijk and Roeselare, Belgium	Combat cited in DFC award citation
8	9 October 1918 @ 0855 hours	Royal Aircraft Factory SE.5a	Fokker D.VII	Set afire in midair; destroyed	Three miles east of Roeselare, Belgium	

== Post World War I ==
On 20 February 1919 the engagement of Glynn and Marian King, of Dawlish, Devon, was announced.

On 30 September 1921 Glynn relinquished his commission and left the Royal Air Force.

Glynn returned for duty in World War II; he was appointed a pilot officer on probation on 2 May 1939 in the Royal Air Force Volunteer Reserve, and confirmed as such on 29 August 1939. However, he had to surrender his commission on 3 May 1941, due to poor health. Glynn died on 4 December 1946, and was buried in Cullompton Cemetery on 9 December.

== Bibliography ==
- Shores, Christopher F.; Franks, Norman & Guest, Russell F. (1990). Above the Trenches: a Complete Record of the Fighter Aces and Units of the British Empire Air Forces 1915-1920. London, UK: Grub Street. ISBN 978-0-948817-19-9.
