= Jack Hunt (RAF officer) =

Frederick John Hunt
- Born: 1899; Whitchurch, Hampshire, England
- Died: 17 March 1954 (aged 54–55); Basingstoke, Hampshire, England
- Military career
- Allegiance: United Kingdom
- Branch: Aviation
- Rank: Lieutenant
- Nickname: "Jack"
- Unit: No. 74 Squadron RAF
- Awards: Distinguished Flying Cross

Lieutenant Frederick John Hunt was an English World War I flying ace credited with nine aerial victories.

== Early life ==
Hunt was born in Whitchurch, Hampshire, England in 1899 the son of Frederick and Emily Hunt, his father was a coal and corn merchant. He would not be old enough for military duty until late in World War I; his earliest known record of service is 1918.

== World War I ==
Hunt was stationed with 74 Squadron in July 1918. He became a balloon buster for his first aerial victory on 1 September 1918, and would win over another balloon and seven of Germany's finest fighter of the war, the Fokker D.VII, by war's end. He was awarded a Distinguished Flying Cross after his seventh victory, though it would not be gazetted until 1 February 1919.

== List of aerial victories ==
See also Aerial victory standards of World War I

No.	Date/time	Aircraft	Foe	Result	Location	Notes
1	1 September 1918 @ 1350 hours	Royal Aircraft Factory SE.5a serial number E5967	Observation balloon	Destroyed	Northeast of Armentières	
2	4 September 1918 @ 1930 hours	Royal Aircraft Factory SE.5a	Fokker D.VII	Driven down out of control	Half a mile south of Lille	
3	17 September 1918 @ 1845 hours	Royal Aircraft Factory SE.5a s/n D6967	Fokker D.VII	Set afire; destroyed	North of Courtrai	
4	21 September 1918 @ 1840 hours	Royal Aircraft Factory SE.5a	Fokker D.VII	Destroyed	Lille	
5	26 October 1918 @ 1455 hours	Royal Aircraft Factory SE.5a	Fokker D.VII	Destroyed	Cordes	
6	26 October 1918 @ 1455 hours	Royal Aircraft Factory SE.5a	Fokker D.VII	Driven down out of control	Cordes	
7	27 October 1918 @ 0940 hours	Royal Aircraft Factory SE.5a s/n C1137	Observation balloon	Destroyed	Molenbaix	
8	30 October 1918 @ 0820 hours	Royal Aircraft Factory SE.5a	Fokker D.VII	Destroyed	De Klype	
9	30 October 1918 @ 0825 hours	Royal Aircraft Factory SE.5a	Fokker D.VII	Set afire; destroyed	Quaremont	

== Post World War I ==
On 31 March 1923, Hunt and Roland John Neale dissolved their partnership in "The Whitchurch Engineering Works". The firm's business was motor, agricultural, and general engineering.

Hunt was living in Ellisfield when his marriage to Frances Ann Selmer of Valparaíso, Chile was set for 29 September 1927.
