= George Gauld (aviator) =

Canadian flying ace

George William Gladstone Gauld
- Born: Unknown; Mimico, Canada
- Died: 28 October 1964; Mimico, Canada
- Military career
- Allegiance: George V of the British Empire
- Branch: Flying service
- Rank: Lieutenant
- Unit: No. 74 Squadron RAF
- Awards: Distinguished Flying Cross
- Other work: Barrister in 1930

Lieutenant George William Gladstone Gauld was a World War I flying ace credited with five aerial victories.

Gauld ran up a string of five victories late in World War I while flying a Royal Aircraft Factory SE.5a for 74 Squadron. On 30 July 1918, in concert with fellow aces Ira Jones and Harold Shoemaker, he flamed a Rumpler reconnaissance plane. On 2 August, he and Frederick Gordon cooperated to capture an LVG recon plane. On 26 October, Gauld drove down a Fokker D.VII out of control. On 1 November 1918, he captured a Fokker D.VII and drove another one down out of control.
