= George Hicks (RAF officer) =

George Rensbury Hicks
- Born: 24 January 1900; Walthamstow, Essex, England
- Died: 24 November 1951 (aged 51); West Derby, Liverpool North, England
- Military career
- Allegiance: United Kingdom
- Branch: Royal Air Force
- Rank: Lieutenant
- Unit: No. 74 (Fighter) Squadron
- Awards: Distinguished Flying Cross

Lieutenant George Rensbury Hicks DFC (24 January 1900 – 24 November 1951) was a First World War flying ace credited with eight aerial victories.

== Biography ==
Hicks was born in Walthamstow, Essex, to George and Matilda Ann Hicks on 24 January 1900.

During the First World War, Hicks served with the Artists Rifles as a private up until 3 November 1917, when he joined the Royal Flying Corps as a lieutenant. Posted to No. 74 (Fighter) Squadron, Hicks achieved all eight of his victories in the Royal Aircraft Factory S.E.5a. Hicks scored his first victory on 15 July 1918, shooting down a Fokker D.VII. His second triumph came on 24 July, this time against a DFW C.V. Hicks shot down another DFW C.V on 19 August. His fourth and fifth victories both came on 5 September 1918, with Hicks shooting down two Fokker D.VIIs, becoming an ace. 24 September saw Hicks achieve another two triumphs in one day – shooting down a Siemens-Schuckert D.IV and an unknown Rumpler biplane. Two days later saw his last victory of the war, when Hicks shot down another Fokker D.VII. Hicks was wounded in action on 2 October 1918.

On 3 June 1919, Hicks was awarded the Distinguished Flying Cross.

Hicks died on 24 November 1951 in West Derby.
