= Henry Eric Dolan =

British flying ace

- Born: 20 January 1896; St. Leonards, Sussex, England
- Died: 12 May 1918 (aged 22); In the vicinity of Wulverghem, Belgium
- Burial place: La Laiterie Military Cemetery, Heuvelland, West Flanders, Belgium
- Relatives: Captain Gerald Roberts Nolan, RN (brother)
- Military career
- Allegiance: Canada; United Kingdom
- Branch: Canadian Army; British Army; Royal Air Force
- Rank: Lieutenant
- Units: Royal Field Artillery; No. 74 Squadron RFC
- Awards: Military Cross

Lieutenant Henry Eric Dolan MC (20 January 1896 – 12 May 1918) was a World War I flying ace credited with seven aerial victories.

== Biography ==
Henry Eric Dolan was born in England, a son of Alfred Archer Dolan, a mining engineer and Violet Eliza Edgeworth (née Hanrick) Dolan. Dolan's parents later lived at Banbury, Oxfordshire. Henry had a brother, Gerald Roberts Dolan. Educated at Downside School, he moved to Canada. Soon after the outbreak of WWI, he enlisted in the Canadian Expeditionary Force. On 20 November 1914 he was commissioned as a temporary second lieutenant in the Royal Field Artillery, and was promoted to temporary lieutenant on 31 January 1916. He was awarded the Military Cross on 1 January 1917.

On 31 August 1917 he was appointed a flying officer in the Royal Flying Corps, and transferred to the General List. In early 1918 he was posted to No. 74 Squadron, which operated Royal Aircraft Factory SE.5as on the Western Front. He was assigned to 'A' Flight, under the leadership of "Mick" Mannock. Dolan scored his first victory when he shot down an Albatros D.V near Merville on 12 April 1918. He scored steadily throughout the following month, notching his seventh triumph on 11 May.

The following day, Dolan fell under the guns of Raven Freiherr von Barnekow. He is buried in plot II, row D, grave 8 at La Laiterie Military Cemetery, Heuvelland, West Flanders, Belgium.
