= James Ira Thomas Jones =

Welsh flying ace (1896–1960)

- Born: 18 April 1896; Carmarthenshire, Wales
- Died: 30 August 1960 (aged 64); Aberaeron, Wales
- Burial place: Sarnau Chapelyard, Bancyfelin
- Military career
- Allegiance: United Kingdom
- Branch: British Army; Royal Air Force
- Service years: 1913–1936; 1939–1945
- Rank: Wing Commander
- Nicknames: Ira Jones; Taffy Jones
- Unit: No. 74 Squadron RAF
- Conflicts: First World War; Second World War
- Awards: Distinguished Service Order; Military Cross; Distinguished Flying Cross & Bar; Military Medal
- Other work: Author

James Ira Thomas "Taffy" Jones DSO, MC, DFC & Bar, MM (18 April 1896 – 30 August 1960) was a Welsh flying ace during the First World War. Jones was born on 18 April 1896 at Woolstone Farm, near St Clears, Carmarthenshire. In 1913, Jones enlisted in the Territorial Army, though he was soon transferred into the newly established Royal Flying Corps, serving as an air mechanic on ground duties (where he earned the Military Medal) before volunteering for flying duties as an Observer. Jones commenced pilot training in August 1917 after being commissioned. After completing his training he joined No. 74 Squadron, where he served until the end of hostilities in 1918.

Although having a reputation for crashing his aircraft when attempting to land, Jones recorded 37 victories in just three months whilst flying the Royal Aircraft Factory S.E.5. He won several awards and decorations during the war including the Military Cross, the Distinguished Flying Cross and bar and the Distinguished Service Order. Jones first retired from the RAF in 1936 but was recommissioned at the outbreak of the Second World War. After retiring again in 1945, Jones lived in Wales where he wrote three books on the RFC and RAF. He died in 1960 through complications after a fall at his home in Wales.

== Early life ==
Ira Jones was born on 18 April 1896, the son of Jane Jones (1866-1949) of Woolstone Farm, near St. Clears, Carmarthenshire. His father is unknown, a fact he concealed throughout his life. He had a stutter, reportedly acquired after being rolled down a hill in a barrel as a child. Jones was a distant relative of the poet, Dylan Thomas. They would later encounter each other when they were both living in New Quay, Cardiganshire, during the Second World War (see below).

== First World War ==
In 1913, while working as a clerk, Jones enlisted with the 4th Welsh in the Territorial Army. Jones was in London studying wireless and cable telegraphy when the First World War started. Awaiting call-up, Jones joined the fledgling Royal Flying Corps, and after training joined No. 10 Squadron RAF as a 1st Class Air Mechanic in the wireless section. Jones was posted to France in July 1915. By January 1916 he was flying combat missions as an observer/gunner on BE-2's, winning his Observer's brevet in October 1916. Jones was awarded the Military Medal in May 1916, for rescuing two wounded gunners under artillery fire whilst he was working at a wireless interception station in the front line.

Jones was awarded the Russian Order of the Cross of St. George in January 1917 after receiving several commendations for bravery. In May 1917 he was sent to England to commence pilot training and he was commissioned in August 1917. After completing his training, Jones was posted to No. 74 Squadron, where he formed a friendship with one of the flight commanders, Captain Edward "Mick" Mannock, and it was with this Squadron that he earned his decorations for bravery. He was once quoted as saying: "It is wonderful how cheered a pilot becomes after he shoots down his first machine; his morale increases by at least 100 percent."

Jones was awarded several decorations during the First World War. These included the Military Cross and two Distinguished Flying Crosses. On 3 August 1918, the London Gazette announced that Jones was to be awarded the Distinguished Flying Cross for the following citation: "In eleven days this officer attacked and destroyed six enemy aeroplanes, displaying great courage, skill and initiative."

In September 1918 Jones was awarded the Military Cross. His citation read:

For conspicuous gallantry and devotion to duty. This officer, one of an offensive patrol, engaged and shot down in flames a two-seater, which fell to earth. Ten days later, on offensive patrol, he shot down a Hannover two-seater, which crashed. The next day, when patrolling, he pursued, overtook and shot down an Albatross two-seater. During the same flight he met a Halberstadt two-seater and killed the observer, who either jumped or fell overboard, but had to break off as his ammunition was finished. The next day he shot a balloon down in flames. Three days later he got a good burst with both guns on a Pfalz scout, both wings coming off. He has driven two others down out of control.

Later on in the same month, Jones was awarded a Bar to his Distinguished Flying Cross. The Gazette described Jones as being a "A gallant officer who in the last three months has destroyed twenty-one enemy aeroplanes." In November 1918, Jones was awarded the Distinguished Service Order. His citation read:

Since joining his present Brigade in May last this officer has destroyed twenty-eight enemy machines. He combines skilful tactics and marksmanship with high courage. While engaged on wireless interception duty he followed a patrol of nine Fokker biplanes, and succeeded in joining their formation unobserved. After a while two Fokkers left the formation to attack one of our artillery observation machines. Following them, Captain Jones engaged the higher of the two, which fell on its companion, and both machines fell interlocked in flames.

In June 1918, Jones became a flight commander. On 30 July he shot down an LVG two seater flying a badly damaged SE-5a, which collapsed on landing. Throughout his service career, Jones had a reputation for crashing his aircraft when attempting to land, reportedly surviving (relatively unscathed) some 28 flying accidents of varying severity. By the end of the War though, he had scored 37 victories in just 3 months whilst flying the Royal Aircraft Factory S.E.5 with 74 Squadron in France. His 37 claims consisted of 1 balloon destroyed, 28 (and 1 shared) aircraft destroyed, and 6 (and 1 shared) "down out of control". After the Armistice he became Commanding Officer of No. 74 Squadron until it was disbanded in 1919.

During the war, he would shoot to kill parachuting enemy pilots saying: "My habit of attacking Huns dangling from parachutes led to many arguments in the mess," he said. "Some officers of the Eton and Sandhurst type thought it 'unsportsmanlike'. Never having been to a public school, I was unhampered by such considerations of 'form'. I just pointed out that there was a bloody war on, and that I intended to avenge my pals."

== Interwar period ==
After the end of hostilities, Jones volunteered to fight with the White movement against the Bolsheviks in the Russian Civil War and was posted to the Archangel front, but saw no further air combat. In 1919, he received a permanent commission in the RAF in the rank of flying officer, and was promoted to flight lieutenant on 1 July 1924. He was promoted to squadron leader on 1 February 1935, and voluntarily retired on 9 July 1936.

== Second World War ==
Sources are uncertain as to the extent of Jones' service in the Second World War. One of his obituaries quotes a story from 1939 when, at the age of 45, Jones tried to get into the Royal Air Force at Windsor Castle. King George VI told him: "You are too old, Taffy. It's a young man's game."

Jones' age notwithstanding, he was recalled in August 1939 as Chief Signals Officer, Training Command Headquarters. By July, acting Wing Commander Jones was OC No. 7 Bombing and Gunnery School, RAF Stormy Down near Porthcawl. It was here that one of his most famed actions occurred when, whilst flying an unarmed Hawker Henley near Swansea, he attacked a Junkers Ju 88 bomber with a Very pistol, a type of flare gun. His actions were enough to fight off the Junkers, which returned to its base. On 1 September, he was promoted to the temporary rank of wing commander, with the service number 04084. After a spell in charge of 57 OTU at Hawarden in January 1941, Jones was given the task of forming No 59 OTU at Turnhouse, near Edinburgh, and then sent to command No 53 OTU Heston, Middlesex. He reportedly flew several unofficial operations in a Spitfire, taking part in several fighter sweeps over Europe. An armourer that was under Jones' command at 53 OTU in 1941 and 1942, recalled:

Taffy designed an unofficial badge for 53 OTU by adding wings to the tiger head of his 74 Squadron, but I cannot recall the motto. Maybe it was in Welsh. He had a habit of raising his drinking arm to the horizontal when toasting 'One f-f-for the T-t-tiger' in his unfortunate but endearing stutter. Likewise when referring to we, his ground staff, as 'm-my m-mechanics'.

For part of the War, Jones and his wife, Olive, lived in Tylegwyn, New Quay, Cardiganshire at the time that Dylan Thomas and his family were also living in the town. Olive has described her friendship with Thomas’ wife, Caitlin, as well as the occasions when Thomas used Ira Jones’ typewriter to work on his poems.

== Later life ==
After the war he returned to St Clears and a career in the Ministry of Pensions. Jones wrote three books, two of them between the wars; King of Air Fighters, a biography of British-Irish World War I flying ace Edward Mannock, Tiger Squadron, a history of 74 Squadron, and An Air Fighter's Scrapbook.

== Death ==
Jones died on 30 August 1960 after a fall at home in Aberaeron, and was buried at Cana Chapelyard, near Bancyfelin. There is also a special commemoration to Jones by St Clears War Memorial which he had unveiled.
