= Sommervieu =

- Commune
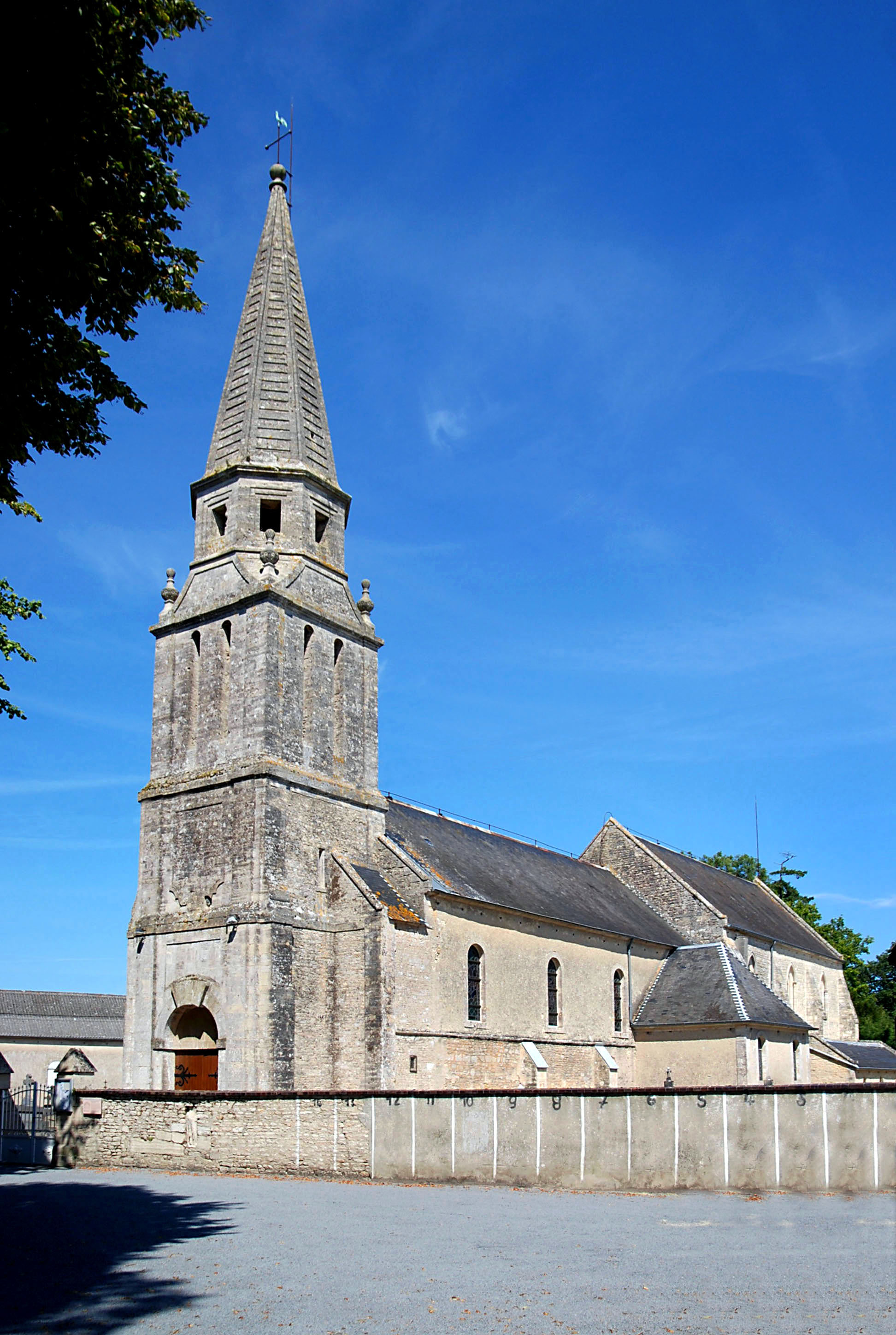
- The church in Sommervieu

- Coat of arms
- Location of Sommervieu
- Location within France Location within Normandy
- Coordinates: 49°17′39″N 0°38′47″W
- Country: France
- Region: Normandy
- Department: Calvados
- Arrondissement: Bayeux
- Canton: Bayeux
- Intercommunality: CC Bayeux Intercom

Government
  - Mayor (2020–2026): Mélanie Lepoultier
- Area^{1}: 4.30 km^{2} (1.66 sq mi)
- Elevation: 50 m (160 ft)
- Highest elevation: 68 m (223 ft)
- Lowest elevation: 31 m (102 ft)
- Population (2023): 987
  - Density: 230/km^{2} (594/sq mi)
- Time zone: UTC+01:00 (CET)
  - Summer (DST): UTC+02:00 (CEST)
- INSEE/Postal code: 14676 /14400
- ^{1} French Land Register data, which excludes lakes, ponds, glaciers > 1 km^{2} (0.386 sq mi or 247 acres) and river estuaries.

Sommervieu (French pronunciation: [sɔmɛʁvjø]) is a commune in the Calvados department in the Normandy region in northwestern France.

== Population ==
Historical population
Year	Pop.	±% p.a.
1968	343	—
1975	555	+7.12%
1982	804	+5.44%
1990	786	−0.28%
1999	734	−0.76%
2007	1,000	+3.94%
2012	1,025	+0.50%
2017	990	−0.69%
2023	987	−0.05%
Source: INSEE

== See also ==
- Communes of the Calvados department
