= Hans Goerth =

German flying ace

- Born: Unknown
- Died: Unknown
- Military career
- Allegiance: Germany
- Branch: Marinefliegerkorps (German Naval Air Service)
- Rank: Vizeflugmeister
- Units: Kusta III; Marine Feld Jasta I Marine Feld Jasta III
- Awards: Landfliegerabzeichen; Ehrenpreis; Iron Cross First Class
- Other work: Flew with Kampfgeschwader Sachsenberg in 1919

Vizeflugmeister Hans Goerth was a World War I German flying ace credited with seven confirmed aerial victories. He was the top ace of Marine Feld Jasta III (MFJ III) of the German Naval Air Service, and was one of the few aces allowed to fly the Fokker E.V monoplane. Goerth received the Iron Cross First Class and other awards for his service. After the war, in 1919, the pilot participated in Kampfgeschwader Sachsenberg, commanded by fellow World War I ace Gotthard Sachsenberg.

== Early military career ==
German insignia 1918

Hans Goerth initially served in Kusta III. He was then with Marine Feld Jasta I from 26 February 1918 until 21 June 1918, after which he transferred to Marine Feld Jasta III, which was formed that month. He remained in Marine Feld Jasta III until the end of the war. Goerth was credited with seven aerial victories. Marine Feld Jasta III, established at the Jabbeke aerodrome on 23 June 1918, was commanded by Leutnant der Reserve der Matrosenartillerie (MA-naval artillery) Gustav Brockhoff, who had at least four confirmed victories during World War I. MFJ III remained at Jabbeke airfield, also referred to as Varsenare or Snellegem, until retreat in early October 1918. With seven confirmed victories, Hans Goerth was the top ace of MFJ III.

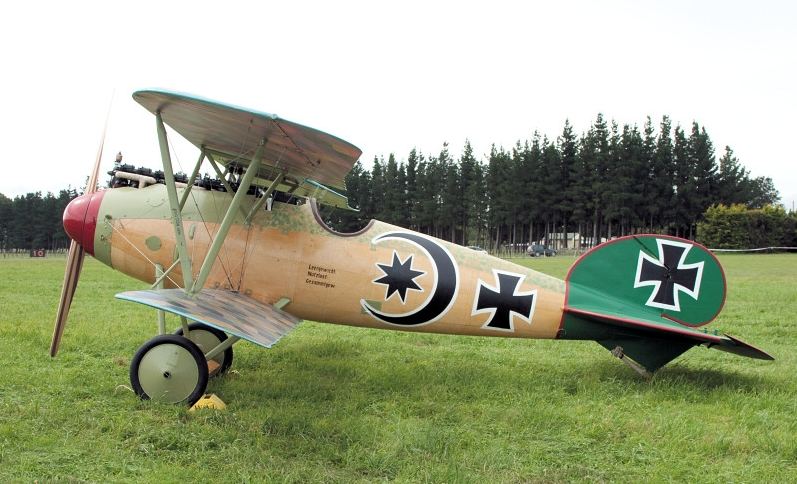
Albatros D.Va

Goerth earned his first two victories while flying an Albatros D.Va with serial number 7167/18. The first plane, Airco de Havilland DH.4 (A8013), was shot down over Mariakerke, Belgium on 30 June 1918. Lieutenant Clifford James Moir and Serjeant Mechanic Edwin Edward Hunnisett, both of No. 217 Squadron of the Royal Air Force died in that conflict. Goerth's second victory was an Airco DH.9 that was taken down over Nieuwpoort, West Flanders, Belgium on 7 July 1918. Lieutenant J. R. Harington and Second Lieutenant Cyril Ivor Bray were the aviators in the DH.9. Both men from No. 206 Squadron of the Royal Air Force were buried in adjacent graves at Anzac Cemetery in Sailly-sur-la-Lys, Pas-de-Calais, France.

On 16 July 1918, over Zevekote, West Flanders, Belgium, Goerth shot down DH.4 (A7868) piloted by British flying ace Lieutenant Lionel Arthur Ashfield of the No. 202 Squadron of the 61st wing of the Royal Air Force. That combat triumph also claimed the life of Irish Lieutenant Maurice Graham English. Goerth's fourth victory took place west of Handzame, West Flanders on 30 August 1918, when he shot down Sopwith Camel (D9482) of the No. 65 Squadron of the Royal Air Force from his Fokker D.VII (Albatros) with serial number 838/18. The aviator in the Camel was Second Lieutenant Henry George Pike. He died in the encounter and is represented on the Arras Flying Services Memorial at the Faubourg d'Amiens Cemetery. Pike is also commemorated at Wandsworth Cemetery in Wandsworth, Greater London, England.

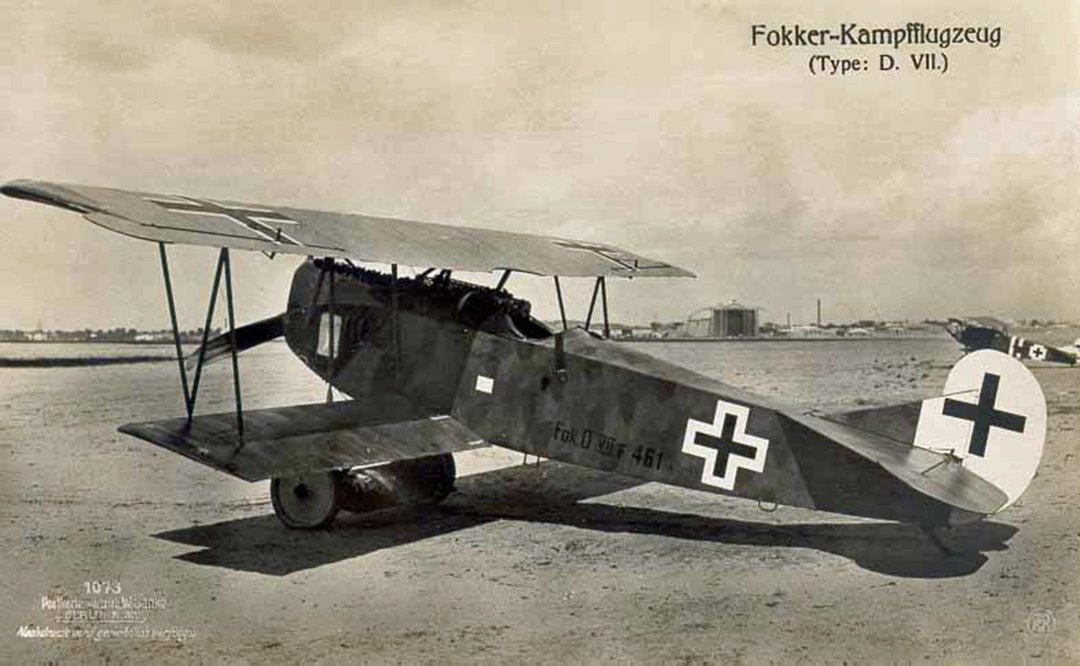
Fokker D.VII(F)

Goerth's remaining victories were from D.VII aircraft as well. On 16 September, Goerth shot down Sopwith Camel (B7271) over Zerkegem, West Flanders. Second Lieutenant Edward Burleigh Markquick of the No. 210 Squadron died in that confrontation and is commemorated on the Arras Flying Services Memorial. Goerth's final two victories (sixth and seventh) both occurred on 1 October 1918. During aerial combat, he first shot down a DH.9 from No. 108 Squadron south of Houthulst, West Flanders and, twenty-five minutes later, a Sopwith Camel from No. 210 Squadron south of Handzame. That day Goerth was piloting a Fokker D.VII marked with a black heart on a white band. Hans Goerth received the Landfliegerabzeichen on 22 May 1918 and the Ehrenrpreis on 28 July 1918. The ace was promoted to Vizeflugmeister in September 1918 and he was the recipient of the Iron Cross First Class.

== Later military career ==
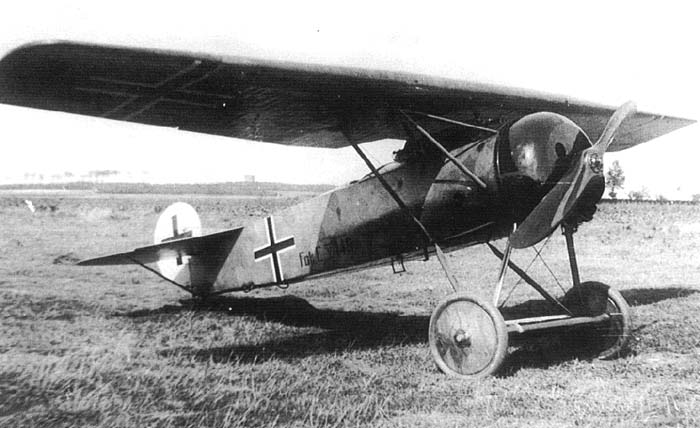
Fokker D.VIII

By the fall of 1918, Idflieg (Inspektion der Fliegertruppen - "Inspectorate of Flying Troops"), had chosen successors to the Fokker D.VII. One that saw action at the front was the Fokker E.V, which was later known as the Fokker D.VIII and nicknamed the "Flying Razor." It was regarded as one of the best German fighter aircraft in the war. At the direction of Anthony Fokker, the Dutch founder of the company, the bottom wings were removed from a D.VII. The resultant aircraft outperformed the original and was designated the V.26; a subsequent modification with a rotary engine led to the V.28. A further modification with advanced cantilever wings resulted in the E.V, which originally had 110 horsepower engines. As 140 horsepower engines became available, they were installed in the planes. An E.V with a factory-installed 140 horsepower engine was designated as a D.VIII; if retrofitted, it retained the E.V designation. Early in production, there were some wing problems that occurred due to a modification that had been requested based on outdated testing; by reverting to the original design, the problem was corrected.

Hans Goerth was the top flying ace of his unit, Marine Feld Jasta III, with seven confirmed victories, and was one of the few aviators to have the opportunity to take the D.VIII into aerial combat. A World War I photograph of Goerth shows a dapper young man posed in front of a Fokker E.V with yellow cowling, wheels, and tail. A Fokker D.VIII was the last fighter plane to record an aerial victory during World War I. After the war, World War I ace Leutnant zur See Gotthard Sachsenberg, who had commanded the Marine Jagdgruppe Flandern, formed Kampfgeschwader Sachsenberg in January 1919. This large unit of about 700 personnel was primarily composed of volunteers who had served in World War I. The unit included several aces, Hans Goerth among them. They fought the Red Army in the Baltic states in 1919. They primarily flew ground support missions to assist the Freikorps units fighting the Russian communists in the Baltic area, and withdrew in December 1919.

== Gallery of planes downed ==
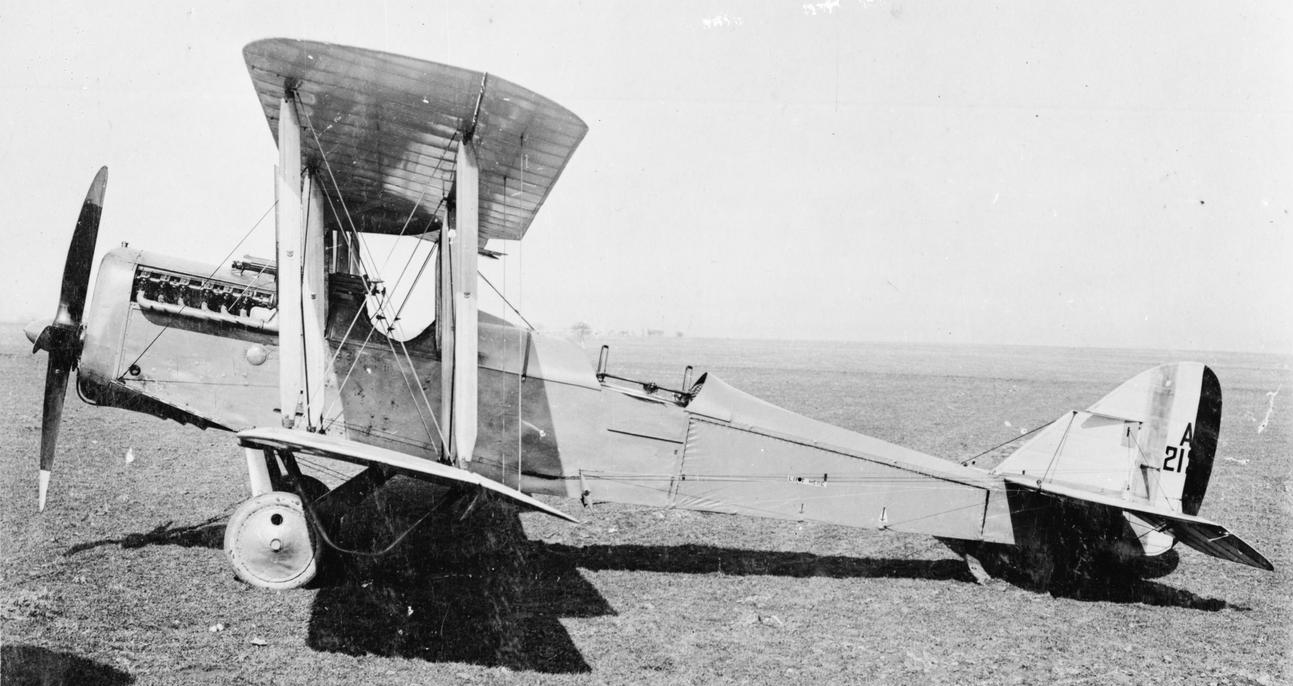
Airco DH.4
Victories 1,3

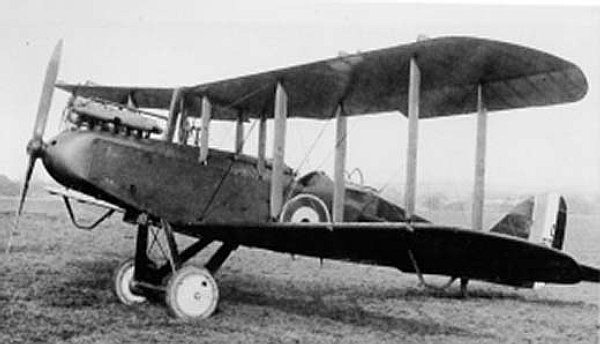
Airco DH.9
Victories 2,6

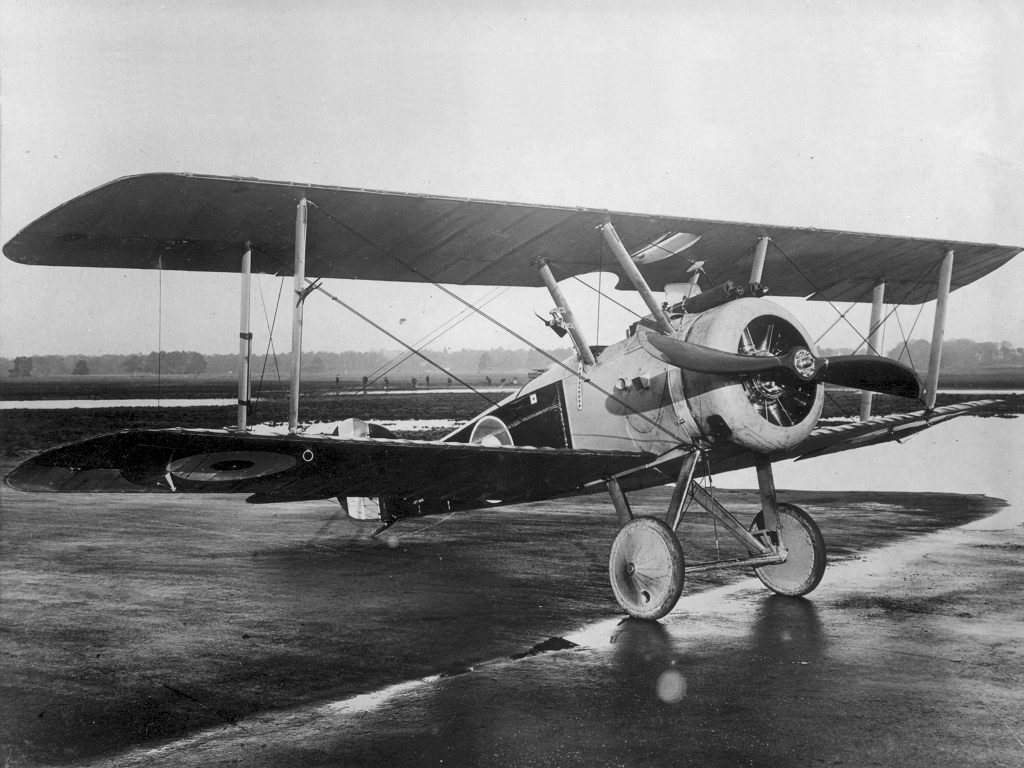
Sopwith Camel
Victories 4,5,7
