= Naval aviation =

Application of military airpower by navies

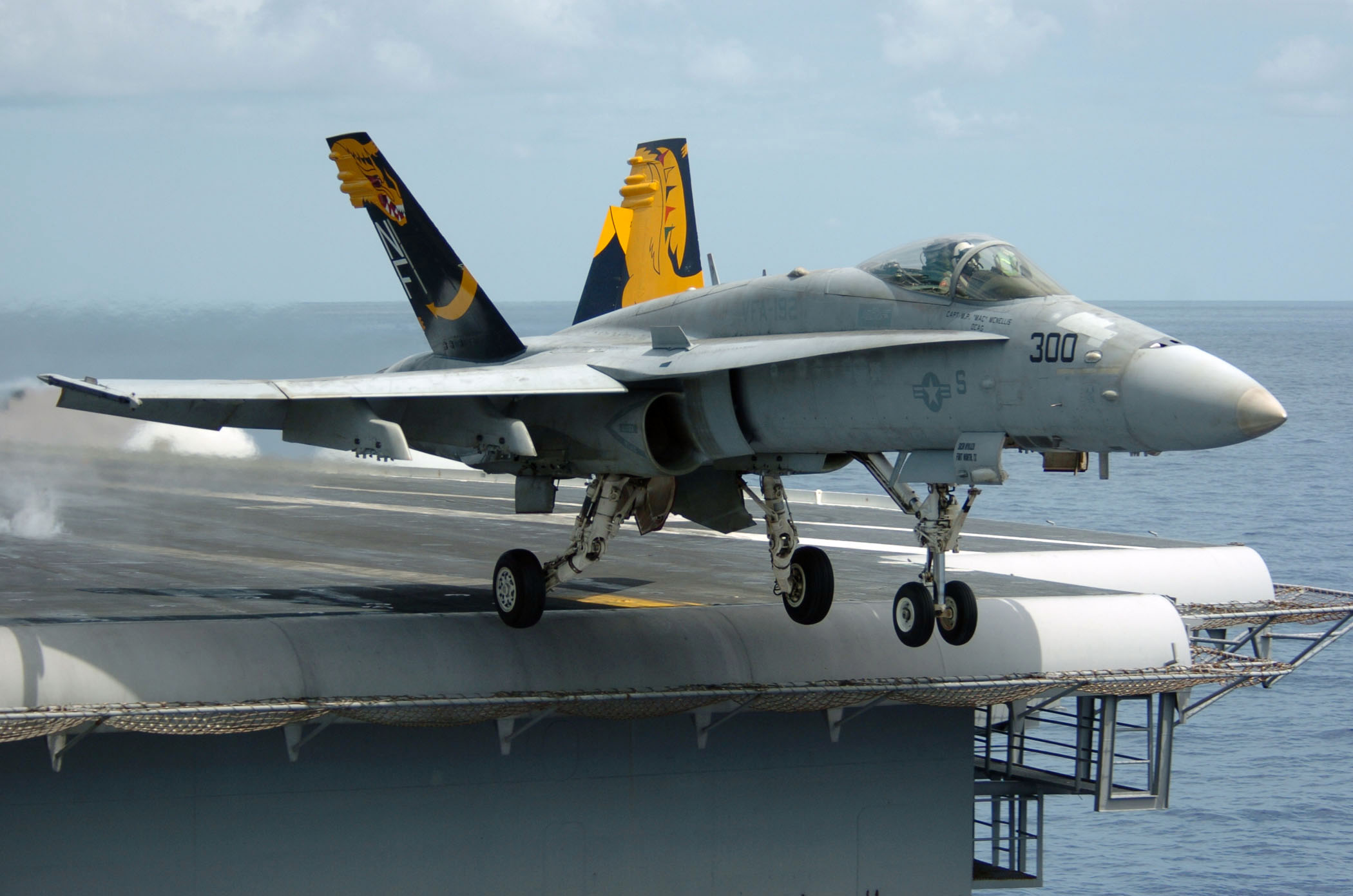
An F/A-18C Hornet launches from the flight deck of the aircraft carrier USS Kitty Hawk.

Naval aviation is the application of military air power by navies, either from warships that can embark aircraft (e.g. aircraft carriers, amphibious assault ships and aircraft cruisers) or from coastal naval air stations. It often involves navalised aircraft, specifically designed for naval use. Seaborne aviation encompasses similar activities not restricted to navies, including marines and coast guards, such as in U.S. naval aviators. As with most army aviation units, naval aviation units are generally separate from a nation's dedicated air force.

Naval aviation operations are typically projected by way of carrier-based aircraft, which must be sturdy enough to withstand the demands of shipborne operations at sea. They must be able to take off from a short runway (typically the flight deck of an aircraft carrier) and be sturdy and flexible enough to come to a sudden stop when landing; they typically have robust folding or swinging wings that reduce the occupied space and thus allow more of them to be stored in below-decks hangars and limited parking spaces on flight decks. These aircraft are designed for many tactical purposes, including aerial combat, airstrike/close air support, anti-submarine warfare, early warning, search and rescue, matériel transport, weather observation, patrol and reconnaissance, and wide-area command and control duties.

Naval aviation first started in the mid-19th century with the use of aerostats such as balloons tethered to balloon tenders, later the use of powered ship-launched airships, for both observation and firebombing, until these were superseded by propeller-powered seaplanes launched from seaplane carriers during the First World War. By the end of the Second World War, aircraft carrier-launched fixed-wing aircraft such as dive bombers and torpedo bombers had dramatically changed the nature of naval warfare, leading to the decline of gun-oriented battleships as fleet capital ships. Nowadays, naval helicopters are used ubiquitously as VTOL aircraft by most navies and perform many of the same missions as fixed-wing aircraft, although the latter have the advantages of significantly faster airspeed, longer operational ranges and heavier payloads. However, helicopters and other VSTOL aircraft (tiltrotor, autogyros and thrust-vectoring jump jets) can be readily operated from aircraft carriers, helicopter carriers, amphibious warfare ships and aviation-capable surface combatants equipped with stern helipad such as cruisers, destroyers, frigates and even some corvettes, while fixed-wing aircraft can only be operated from large carriers with a sufficiently long flight deck and mandatorily also STOL-assisting devices such as ski-jump/catapults, arresting gears and optical landing systems.

== History ==
=== Establishment ===
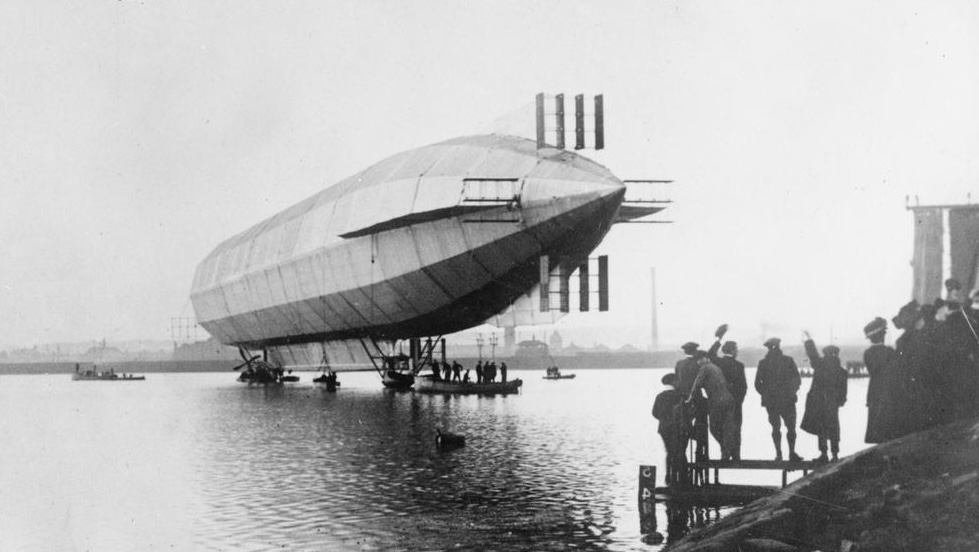
Mayfly was built in 1908 and was the first powered aircraft to be used in a naval capacity.

Early experiments on the use of kites for naval reconnaissance took place in 1903 at Woolwich Common for the Admiralty. Samuel Franklin Cody demonstrated the capabilities of his 8-foot-long black kite and it was proposed for use as either a mechanism to hold up wires for Wireless communications or as a manned reconnaissance device that would give the viewer the advantage of considerable height.

In 1908 Prime Minister H. H. Asquith approved the formation of an "Aerial Sub-Committee of the Committee of Imperial Defence" to investigate the potential for naval aviation. In 1909 this body accepted the proposal of Captain Reginald Bacon made to the First Sea Lord Sir John Fisher that rigid airships should be constructed for the Royal Navy to be used for reconnaissance. This resulted in the construction of Mayfly in 1909, the first air component of the navy to become operational, and the genesis of modern naval aviation.

The first pilots for the Royal Navy were transferred from the Royal Aero Club in June 1910 along with two aircraft with which to train new pilots, and an airfield at Eastchurch became the Naval Flying School, the first such facility in the world. Two hundred applications were received, and four were accepted: Lieutenant C R Samson, Lieutenant A M Longmore, Lieutenant A Gregory and Captain E L Gerrard, RMLI.

The French also established a naval aviation capability in 1910 with the establishment of the Service Aeronautique and the first flight training schools.

U.S. naval aviation began with pioneer aviator Glenn Curtiss who contracted with the United States Navy to demonstrate that airplanes could take off from and land aboard ships at sea. One of his pilots, Eugene Ely, took off from the cruiser USS Birmingham anchored off the Virginia coast in November 1910. Two months later Ely landed aboard another cruiser, USS Pennsylvania, in San Francisco Bay, proving the concept of shipboard operations. However, the platforms erected on those vessels were temporary measures. The U.S. Navy and Glenn Curtiss experienced two firsts during January 1911. On 27 January, Curtiss flew the first seaplane from the water at San Diego Bay and the next day U.S. Navy Lt. Theodore G. Ellyson, a student at the nearby Curtiss School, took off in a Curtiss "grass cutter" plane to become the first naval aviator.

$25,000 was appropriated for the Bureau of Navigation (United States Navy) to purchase three airplanes and in the spring of 1911 four additional officers were trained as pilots by the Wright brothers and Curtiss. A camp with a primitive landing field was established on the Severn River at Greenbury Point, near Annapolis, Maryland. The vision of the aerial fleet was for scouting. Each aircraft would have a pilot and observer. The observer would use the wireless radio technology to report on enemy ships. Some thoughts were given to deliver counterattacks on hostile aircraft using "explosives or other means". Using airplanes to bomb ships was seen as largely impractical at the time. CAPT Washington Irving Chambers felt it was much easier to defend against airplanes than mines or torpedoes. The wireless radio was cumbersome (greater than 50 pounds), but the technology was improving. Experiments were underway for the first ICS (pilot to observer comms) using headsets, as well as connecting the observer to the radio. The navy tested both telephones and voice tubes for ICS. As of August 1911, Italy was the only other navy known to be adapting hydroplanes for naval use.

The group expanded with the addition of six aviators in 1912 and five in 1913, from both the Navy and Marine Corps, and conducted maneuvers with the Fleet from the battleship USS Mississippi, designated as the Navy's aviation ship. Meanwhile, Captain Henry C. Mustin successfully tested the concept of the catapult launch in August 1912, and in 1915 made the first catapult launching from a ship underway. The first permanent naval air station was established at Pensacola, Florida, in January 1914 with Mustin as its commanding officer. On April 24 of that year, and for a period of approximately 45 days afterward, five floatplanes and flying boats flown by ten aviators operated from Mississippi and the cruiser Birmingham off Veracruz and Tampico, Mexico, respectively, conducting reconnaissance for troops ashore in the wake of the Tampico Affair.

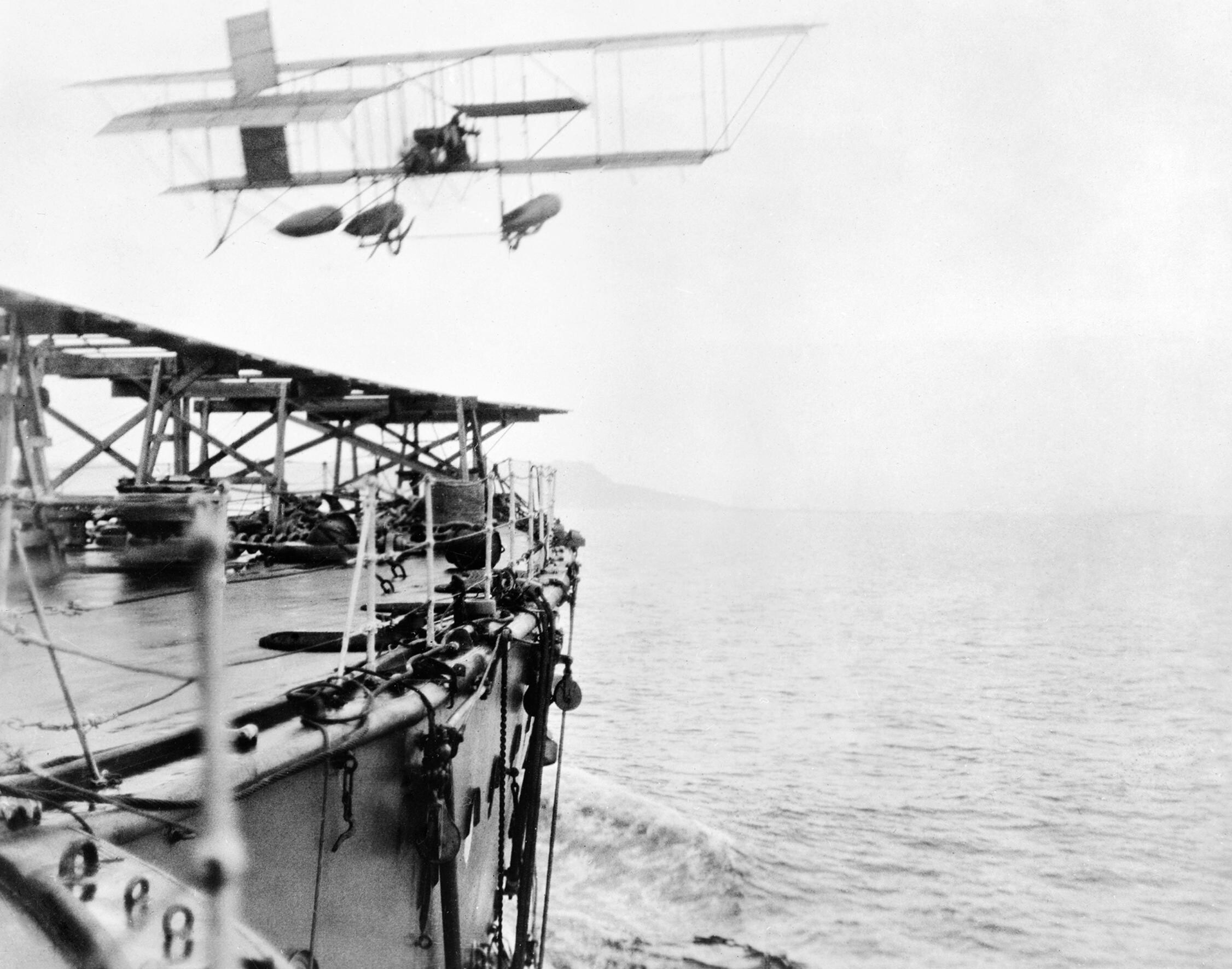
Lieutenant Charles Samson's historic takeoff from Hibernia in 1912.

In January 1912, the British battleship HMS Africa took part in aircraft experiments at Sheerness. She was fitted for flying off aircraft with a 100-foot (30 m) downward-sloping runway which was installed on her foredeck, running over her forward 12-inch (305 mm) gun turret from her forebridge to her bow and equipped with rails to guide the aircraft. The Gnome-engined Short Improved S.27 "S.38", pusher seaplane piloted by Lieutenant Charles Samson become the first British aircraft to take-off from a ship while at anchor in the River Medway, on 10 January 1912. Africa then transferred her flight equipment to her sister ship Hibernia.

In May 1912, with Commander Samson again flying the "S.38", the first ever instance of an aircraft to take off from a ship which was under way occurred. Hibernia steamed at 10.5 knots (19.4 km/h; 12.1 mph) at the Royal Fleet Review in Weymouth Bay, England. Hibernia then transferred her aviation equipment to battleship London. Based on these experiments, the Royal Navy concluded that aircraft were useful aboard ship for spotting and other purposes, but that interference with the firing of guns caused by the runway built over the foredeck and the danger and impracticality of recovering seaplanes that alighted in the water in anything but calm weather more than offset the desirability of having airplanes aboard. In 1912, the nascent naval air detachment in the United Kingdom was amalgamated to form the Royal Flying Corps and in 1913 a seaplane base on the Isle of Grain, an airship base at Kingsnorth and eight new airfields were approved for construction. The first aircraft participation in naval manoeuvres took place in 1913 with the cruiser Hermes converted into a seaplane carrier. In 1914, naval aviation was split again, and became the Royal Naval Air Service. However, shipboard naval aviation had begun in the Royal Navy, and would become a major part of fleet operations by 1917.

Other early operators of seaplanes were Germany, within its Marine-Fliegerabteilung naval aviation units within the Kaiserliche Marine, and Russia. In May 1913 Germany established a naval zeppelin detachment in Berlin-Johannisthal and an airplane squadron in Putzig (Puck, Poland). The Japanese established the Imperial Japanese Navy Air Service, modelled on the RNAS, in 1913. On 24 January 1913 came the first wartime naval aviation interservice cooperation mission. Greek pilots on a seaplane observed and drew a diagram of the positions of the Turkish fleet against which they dropped four bombs. This event was widely commented upon in the press, both Greek and international.

=== World War I ===
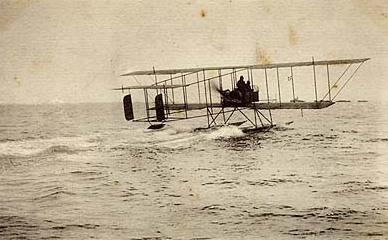
Japanese Maurice Farman seaplane from Wakamiya

At the outbreak of war the Royal Naval Air Service had 93 aircraft, six airships, two balloons and 727 personnel, making it larger than the Royal Flying Corps. The main roles of the RNAS were fleet reconnaissance, patrolling coasts for enemy ships and submarines, attacking enemy coastal territory and defending Britain from enemy air-raids, along with deployment along the Western Front. In 1914 the first aerial torpedo was dropped in trials performed in a Short "Folder" by Lieutenant (later Air Chief Marshal Sir) Arthur Longmore, and in August 1915, a Short Type 184 piloted by Flight Commander Charles Edmonds from HMS Ben-my-Chree sank a Turkish supply ship in the Sea of Marmara with a 14-inch-diameter (360 mm), 810-pound (370 kg) torpedo.

The first strike from a seaplane carrier against a land target as well as a sea target took place in September 1914 when the Imperial Japanese Navy carrier Wakamiya conducted ship-launched air raids from Kiaochow Bay during the Battle of Tsingtao in China. The four Maurice Farman seaplanes bombarded German-held land targets (communication centers and command centers) and damaged a German minelayer in the Tsingtao peninsula from September until 6 November 1914, when the Germans surrendered. One Japanese plane was credited being shot down by the German aviator Gunther Plüschow in an Etrich Taube, using his pistol.

On the Western front the first naval air raid occurred on 25 December 1914 when twelve seaplanes from HMS Engadine, Riviera and Empress (cross-channel steamers converted into seaplane carriers) attacked the Zeppelin base at Cuxhaven. The raid was not a complete success, owing to sub-optimal weather conditions, including fog and low cloud, but the raid was able to conclusively demonstrate the feasibility of air-to-land strikes from a naval platform. Two German airships were destroyed at the Tøndern base on July 19, 1918, by seven Sopwith Camels launched from the carrier HMS Furious.

In August 1914 Germany operated 20 planes and one Zeppelin, another 15 planes were confiscated. They operated from bases in Germany and Flanders (Belgium). On 19 August 1918 several British torpedo boats were sunk by 10 German planes near Heligoland. These are considered as the first naval units solely destroyed by airplanes. During the war the German "Marineflieger" claimed the destruction of 270 enemy planes, 6 balloons, 2 airships, 1 Russian destroyer, 4 merchant ships, 3 submarines, 4 torpedo boats and 12 vehicles, for the loss of 170 German sea and land planes as well as 9 vehicles. Notable Marineflieger aces were Gotthard Sachsenberg (31 victories), Alexander Zenzes (18 victories), Friedrich Christiansen (13 victories, 1 airship and 1 submarine), Karl Meyer (8 victories), Karl Scharon (8 victories), and Hans Goerth (7 victories).

=== Development of the aircraft carrier ===
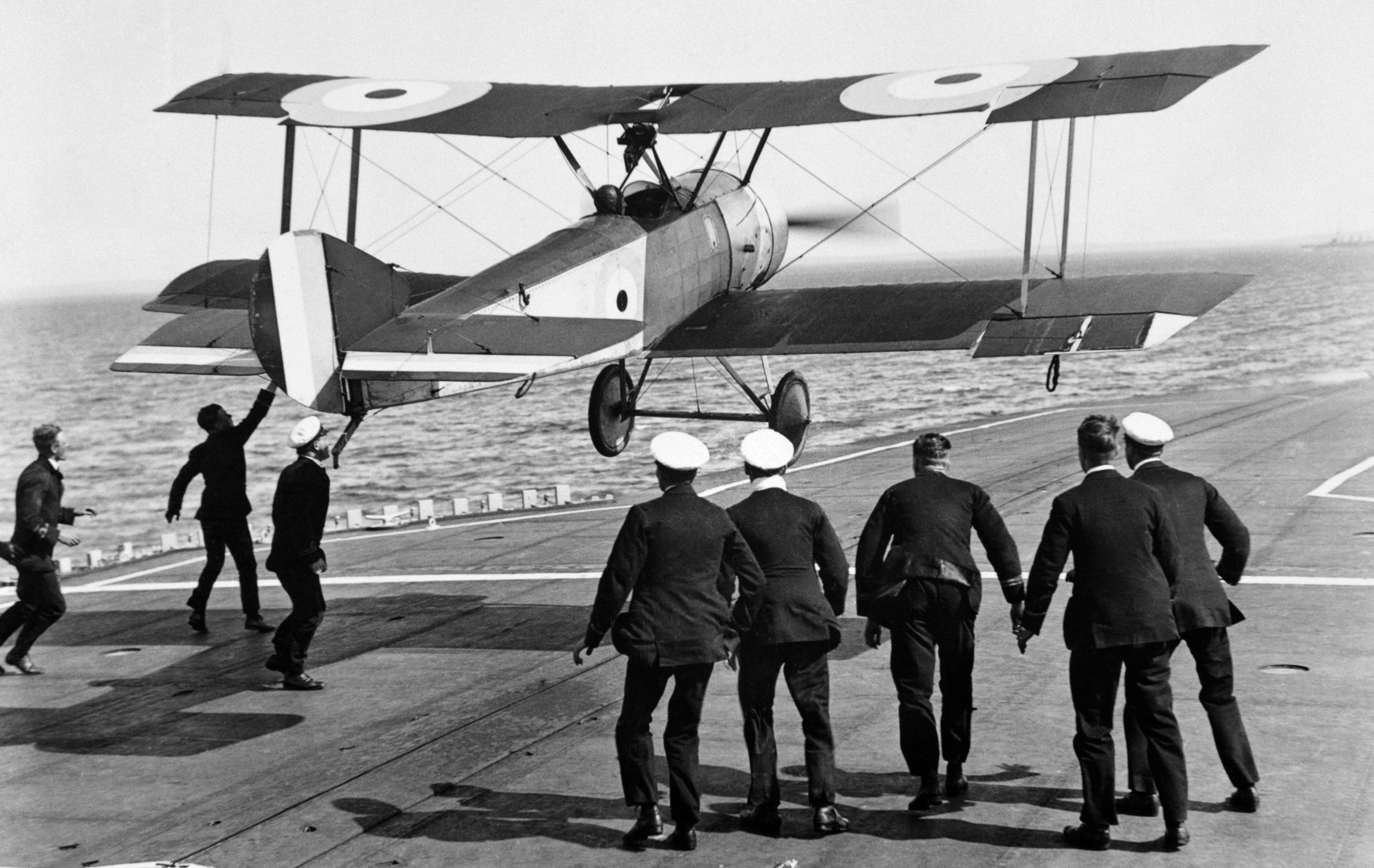
Sqn. Cdr. E. H. Dunning makes the first landing of an aircraft on a moving ship, a Sopwith Pup on HMS Furious, 2 August 1917

The need for a more mobile strike capacity led to the development of the aircraft carrier – the backbone of modern naval aviation. HMS Ark Royal was the first purpose-built seaplane carrier and was also arguably the first modern aircraft carrier. She was originally laid down as a merchant ship, but was converted on the building stocks to be a hybrid airplane/seaplane carrier with a launch platform and the capacity to hold up to four wheeled aircraft. Launched on 5 September 1914, she served in the Dardanelles campaign and throughout World War I.

During World War I the Royal Navy also used HMS Furious to experiment with the use of wheeled aircraft on ships. This ship was reconstructed three times between 1915 and 1925: first, while still under construction, it was modified to receive a flight deck on the fore-deck; in 1917 it was reconstructed with separate flight decks fore and aft of the superstructure; then finally, after the war, it was heavily reconstructed with a three-quarter length main flight deck, and a lower-level take-off only flight deck on the fore-deck.

On 2 August 1917, Squadron Commander E.H. Dunning, Royal Navy, landed his Sopwith Pup aircraft on Furious in Scapa Flow, Orkney, becoming the first person to land a plane on a moving ship. He was killed five days later during another landing on Furious.

HMS Argus was converted from an ocean liner and became the first example of what is now the standard pattern of aircraft carrier, with a full-length flight deck that allowed wheeled aircraft to take off and land. After commissioning, the ship was heavily involved for several years in the development of the optimum design for other aircraft carriers. Argus also evaluated various types of arresting gear, general procedures needed to operate a number of aircraft in concert, and fleet tactics.

The Tondern raid, a British bombing raid against the Imperial German Navy's airship base at Tønder, Denmark was the first attack in history made by aircraft flying from a carrier flight deck, with seven Sopwith Camels launched from HMS Furious. For the loss of one man, the British destroyed two German zeppelins, L.54 and L.60 and a captive balloon.

=== Interwar period ===
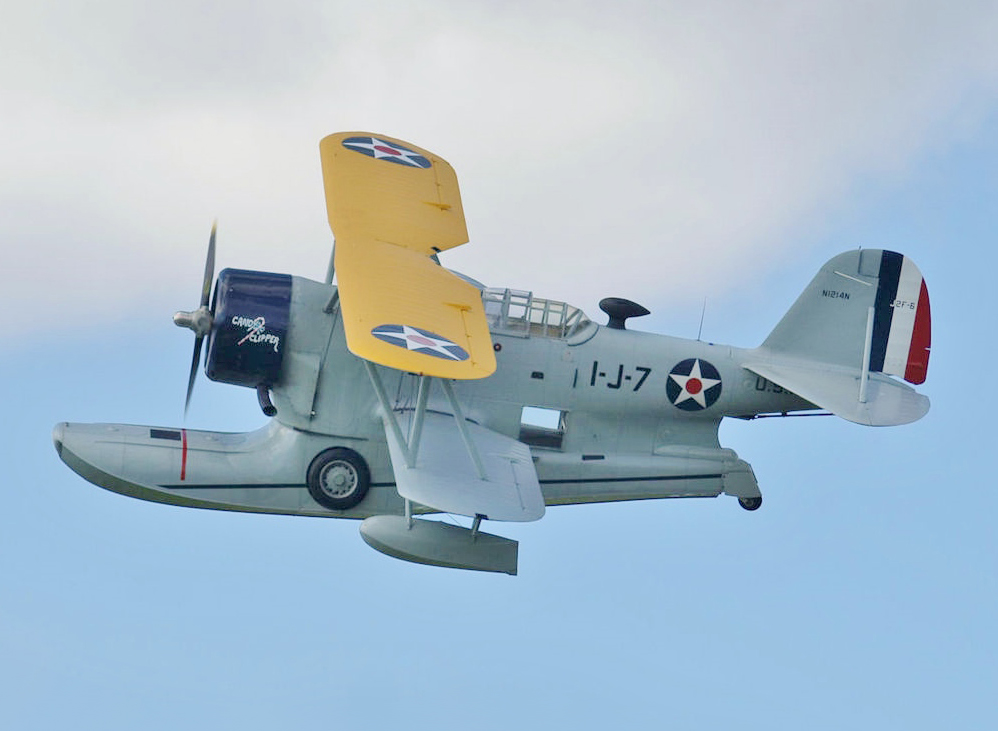
The Grumman J2F Duck was an amphibious biplane used for patrol

Genuine aircraft carriers did not emerge beyond Britain until the early 1920s.

The Japanese Hōshō (1921) was the world's first purpose-built aircraft carrier, although the initial plans and laying down for HMS Hermes (1924) had begun earlier. Both Hōshō and Hermes initially boasted the two most distinctive features of a modern aircraft carrier: a full-length flight deck and a starboard-side control tower island. Both continued to be adjusted in the light of further experimentation and experience, however: Hōshō even opted to remove its island entirely in favor of a less obstructed flight deck and improved pilot visibility. Instead, Japanese carriers opted to control their flight operations from a platform extending from the side of the flight deck.

In the United States, Admiral William Benson attempted to entirely dissolve the USN's Naval Aeronautics program in 1919. Assistant Secretary of the Navy Franklin Roosevelt and others succeeded in maintaining it, but the service continued to support battleship-based doctrines. To counter Billy Mitchell's campaign to establish a separate Department of Aeronautics, Secretary of the Navy Josephus Daniels ordered a rigged test against USS Indiana in 1920 which reached the conclusion that "the entire experiment pointed to the improbability of a modern battleship being either destroyed or completely put out of action by aerial bombs." Investigation by the New-York Tribune that discovered the rigging led to Congressional resolutions compelling more honest studies. The sinking of SMS Ostfriesland involved violating the Navy's rules of engagement but completely vindicated Mitchell to the public. Some men, such as Captain (soon Rear Admiral) William A. Moffett, saw the publicity stunt as a means to increase funding and support for the Navy's aircraft carrier projects. Moffett was sure that he had to move decisively to avoid having his fleet air arm fall into the hands of a proposed combined Land/Sea Air Force which took care of all the United States's airpower needs. (That very fate had befallen the two air services of the United Kingdom in 1918: the Royal Flying Corps had been combined with the Royal Naval Air Service to become the Royal Air Force, a condition which would remain until 1937.) Moffett supervised the development of naval air tactics throughout the '20s. The first aircraft carrier entered the U.S. fleet with the conversion of the collier USS Jupiter and its recommissioning as USS Langley in 1922.

Many British naval vessels carried float planes, seaplanes or amphibians for reconnaissance and spotting: two to four on battleships or battlecruisers and one on cruisers. The aircraft, a Fairey Seafox or later a Supermarine Walrus, were catapult-launched, and landed on the sea alongside for recovery by crane. Several submarine aircraft carriers were built by Japan, each carrying one floatplane, which did not prove effective in war. The French Navy built one large submarine, Surcouf, which also carried one floatplane, and was also not effective in war.

=== World War II ===
World War II saw the emergence of naval aviation as the decisive element in the war at sea. The principal users were Japan, United States (both with Pacific interests to protect) and Britain. Germany, the Soviet Union, France and Italy had a lesser involvement. Soviet Naval Aviation was mostly organised as land-based coastal defense force (apart from some scout floatplanes it consisted almost exclusively of land-based types also used by its air arms).

During the course of the war, seaborne aircraft were used in fleet actions at sea (Midway, Bismarck), strikes against naval units in port (Taranto, Pearl Harbor), support of ground forces (Okinawa, Allied invasion of Italy) and anti-submarine warfare (the Battle of the Atlantic). Carrier-based aircraft were specialised as dive bombers, torpedo bombers, and fighters. Surface-based aircraft such as the PBY Catalina helped finding submarines and surface fleets.

In World War II the aircraft carrier replaced the battleship as the most powerful naval offensive weapons system as battles between fleets were increasingly fought out of gun range by aircraft. The Japanese Yamato, the heaviest battleship ever built, was first turned back by light escort carrier aircraft and later sunk lacking its own air cover.

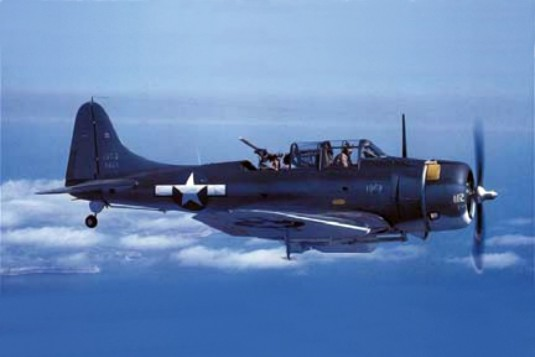
The Douglas Dauntless SBD was used extensively during the Battle of Midway.

During the Doolittle Raid of 1942, 16 Army medium bombers were launched from the carrier Hornet on one-way missions to bomb Japan. All were lost to fuel exhaustion after bombing their targets and the experiment was not repeated. Smaller carriers were built in large numbers to escort slow cargo convoys or supplement fast carriers. Aircraft for observation or light raids were also carried by battleships and cruisers, while blimps were used to search for attack submarines.

Experience showed that there was a need for widespread use of aircraft which could not be met quickly enough by building new fleet aircraft carriers. This was particularly true in the North Atlantic, where convoys were highly vulnerable to U-boat attack. The British authorities used unorthodox, temporary, but effective means of giving air protection such as CAM ships and merchant aircraft carriers, merchant ships modified to carry a small number of aircraft. The solution to the problem were large numbers of mass-produced merchant hulls converted into escort aircraft carriers (also known as "jeep carriers"). These basic vessels, unsuited to fleet action by their capacity, speed and vulnerability, nevertheless provided air cover where it was needed.

The Royal Navy had observed the impact of naval aviation and, obliged to prioritise their use of resources, abandoned battleships as the mainstay of the fleet. HMS Vanguard was therefore the last British battleship and her sisters were cancelled. The United States had already instigated a large construction programme (which was also cut short) but these large ships were mainly used as anti-aircraft batteries or for shore bombardment.

Other actions involving naval aviation included:

- Battle of the Atlantic, aircraft carried by low-cost escort carriers were used for antisubmarine patrol, defense, and attack.
- At the start of the Pacific War in 1941, Japanese carrier-based aircraft sank many US warships during the attack on Pearl Harbor and land-based aircraft sank two large British warships. Engagements between Japanese and American naval fleets were then conducted largely or entirely by aircraft – examples include the battles of Coral Sea, Midway, Bismarck Sea and Philippine Sea.
- Battle of Leyte Gulf, with the first appearance of kamikazes, perhaps the largest naval battle in history. Japan's last carriers and pilots are deliberately sacrificed, a battleship is sunk by aircraft.
- Operation Ten-Go demonstrated U.S. air supremacy in the Pacific theater by this stage in the war and the vulnerability of surface ships without air cover to aerial attack.

=== Post-war developments ===
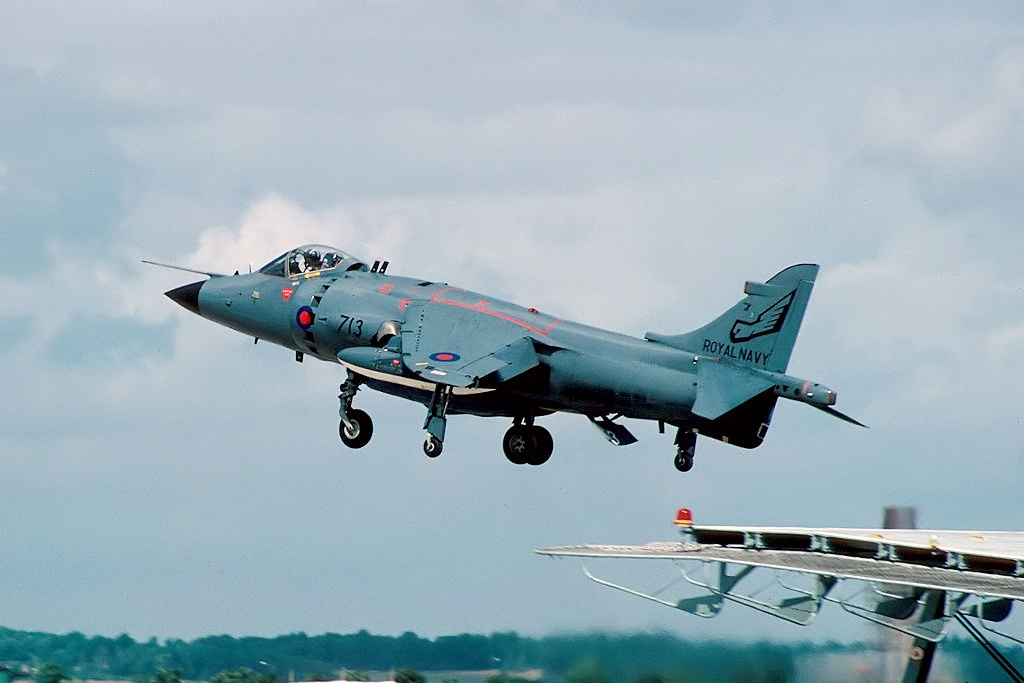
The ski-jump and a Sea Harrier on Royal Navy carrier HMS Invincible.

Jet aircraft were used on aircraft carriers after the War. The first jet landing on a carrier was made by Lt Cdr Eric 'Winkle' Brown who landed on HMS Ocean in the specially modified de Havilland Vampire (registration LZ551/G) on 3 December 1945. Following the introduction of angled flight decks, jets were regularly operating from carriers by the mid-1950s.

An important development of the early 1950s was the British invention of the angled flight deck by Capt Dennis Cambell RN in conjunction with Lewis Boddington of the Royal Aircraft Establishment at Farnborough. The runway was canted at an angle of a few degrees from the longitudinal axis of the ship. If an aircraft missed the arrestor cables (referred to as a "bolter"), the pilot only needed to increase engine power to maximum to get airborne again, and would not hit the parked aircraft because the angled deck pointed out over the sea. The angled flight deck was first tested on HMS Triumph, by painting angled deck markings onto the centerline flight deck for touch and go landings. The modern steam-powered catapult, powered by steam from a ship's boilers or reactors, was invented by Commander C.C. Mitchell of the Royal Naval Reserve. It was widely adopted following trials on HMS Perseus between 1950 and 1952 which showed it to be more powerful and reliable than the hydraulic catapults which had been introduced in the 1940s. The first Optical Landing System, the Mirror landing aid was invented by Lieutenant Commander H. C. N. Goodhart RN. The first trials of a mirror landing sight were conducted on HMS Illustrious in 1952.

The US Navy built the first aircraft carrier to be powered by nuclear reactors. USS Enterprise was powered by eight nuclear reactors and was the second surface warship (after USS Long Beach) to be powered in this way. The post-war years also saw the development of the helicopter, with a variety of useful roles and mission capability aboard aircraft carriers and other naval ships. In the late 1950s and early 1960s, the United Kingdom and the United States converted some older carriers into Commando Carriers or Landing Platform Helicopters (LPH); seagoing helicopter airfields like HMS Bulwark. To mitigate the expensive connotations of the term "aircraft carrier", the Invincible-class carriers were originally designated as "through deck cruisers" and were initially to operate as helicopter-only craft escort carriers.

The arrival of the Sea Harrier VTOL/STOVL fast jet meant that the Invincible-class could carry fixed-wing aircraft, despite their short flight decks. The British also introduced the ski-jump ramp as an alternative to contemporary catapult systems. As the Royal Navy retired or sold the last of its World War II-era carriers, they were replaced with smaller ships designed to operate helicopters and the V/STOVL Sea Harrier jet. The ski-jump gave the Harriers an enhanced STOVL capability, allowing them to take off with heavier payloads.

In 2013, the US Navy completed the first successful catapult launch and arrested landing of an unmanned aerial vehicle (UAV) aboard an aircraft carrier. After a decade of research and planning, the US Navy has been testing the integration of UAVs with carrier-based forces since 2013, using the experimental Northrop Grumman X-47B, and is working to procure a fleet of carrier-based UAVs, referred to as the Unmanned Carrier Launched Airborne Surveillance and Strike (UCLASS) system.

== Roles ==
Naval aviation forces primarily perform naval roles at sea. However, they are also used for other tasks which vary between states. Common roles for such forces include:

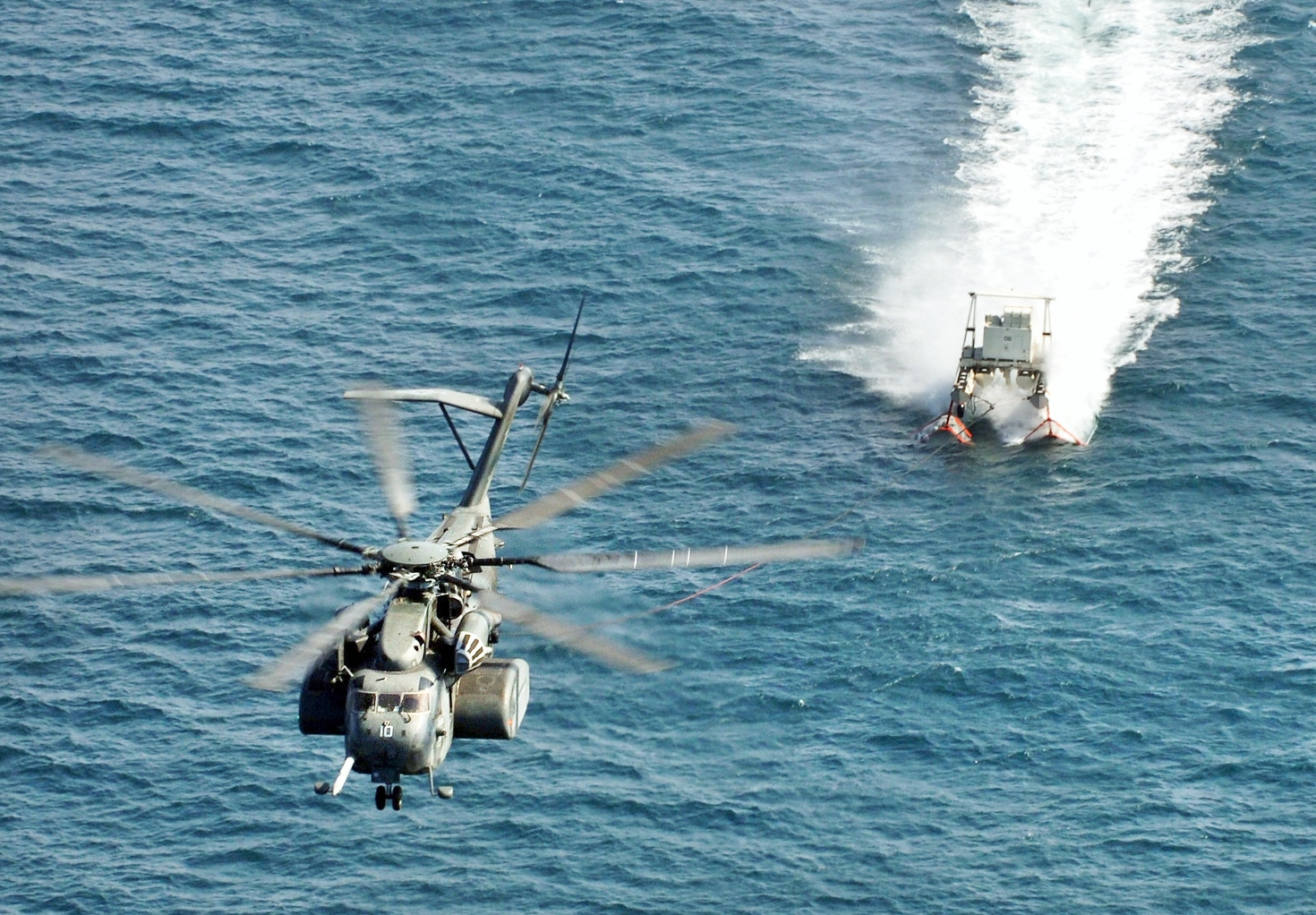
An MH-53E helicopter, performs mine countermeasure training using the MK-105 sled

=== Fleet air defense ===
Carrier-based naval aviation provides a country's seagoing forces with air cover over areas that may not be reachable by land-based aircraft, giving them a considerable advantage over navies composed primarily of surface combatants.

=== Strategic projection ===
Naval aviation also provides countries with the opportunity to deploy military aircraft over land and sea, without the need for air bases on land.

=== Mine countermeasures ===
Aircraft may be used to conduct naval mine clearance, the aircraft tows a sled through the water but is itself at a significant distance from the water, hopefully putting itself out of harm's way. Aircraft include the MH-53E and AW101.

=== Anti-surface warfare ===
Aircraft operated by navies are also used in the anti-surface warfare (ASUW or ASuW) role, to attack enemy ships and other, surface combatants. This is generally conducted using air-launched anti-ship missiles.

=== Amphibious warfare ===
Naval aviation is also used as part of amphibious warfare. Aircraft based on naval ships provide support to marines and other forces performing amphibious landings. Ship-based aircraft may also be used to support amphibious forces as they move inland.

=== Maritime patrol ===
Naval aircraft are used for various maritime patrol missions, such as reconnaissance, search and rescue, and maritime law enforcement.

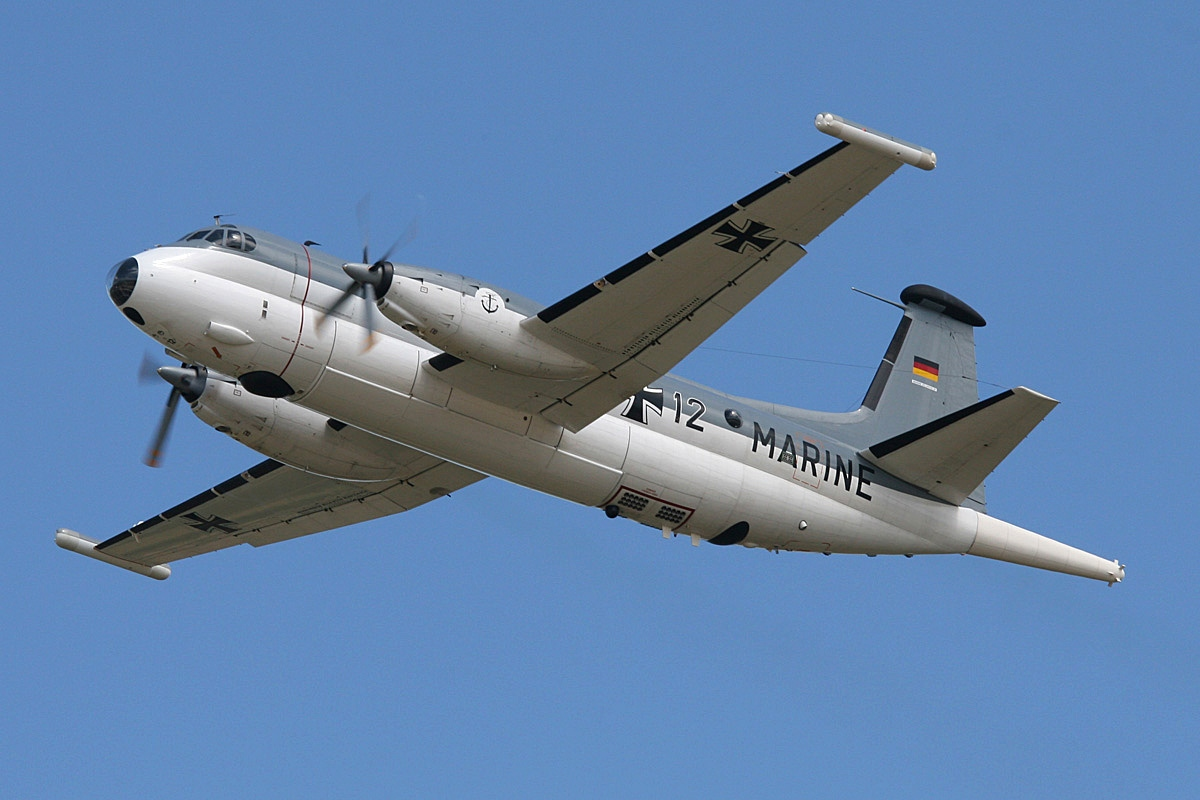
A German Navy 1150 Atlantic is an example of a ASW land based aircraft

=== Vertical replenishment ===
Vertical replenishment (VERTREP) is a method of supplying naval vessels at sea, by helicopter. This means moving cargo and supplies from supply ships to the flight decks of other naval vessels using naval helicopters.

=== Anti-submarine warfare ===
During the Cold War, the navies of NATO faced a significant threat from Soviet submarine forces, specifically Soviet Navy SSN and SSGN assets. This resulted in the development and deployment of light aircraft carriers with major anti-submarine warfare (ASW) capabilities by European NATO navies. One of the most effective weapons against submarines is the ASW helicopter, several of which could be based on these light ships. These carriers are typically around 20,000 tons displacement and carry a mix of ASW helicopters and fixed wing aircraft. Land-based maritime patrol aircraft are also useful in this role, since they can operate independently of aircraft carriers.

=== Disaster relief ===
Naval aircraft are used to airlift supplies, insert specialized personnel (e.g. medical staff, relief workers), and evacuate persons in distress in the aftermath of natural disasters. Naval aircraft are vital in cases where traditional infrastructure to provide relief are destroyed or overtaxed in the wake of a disaster, such as when a region's airport is destroyed or overcrowded and the region cannot be effectively accessed by road or helicopter. The capability of ships to provide clean, fresh water which can be transported by helicopter to affected areas is also valuable. Naval aircraft played an important part in providing relief in the wake of the 2010 Haiti earthquake and Typhoon Haiyan.

== List of naval aviation units ==
=== Current ===
- Argentine Naval Aviation (Argentine Navy)
- Fleet Air Arm (RAN) (Royal Australian Navy)
- Bangladesh Naval Aviation (Bangladesh Navy)
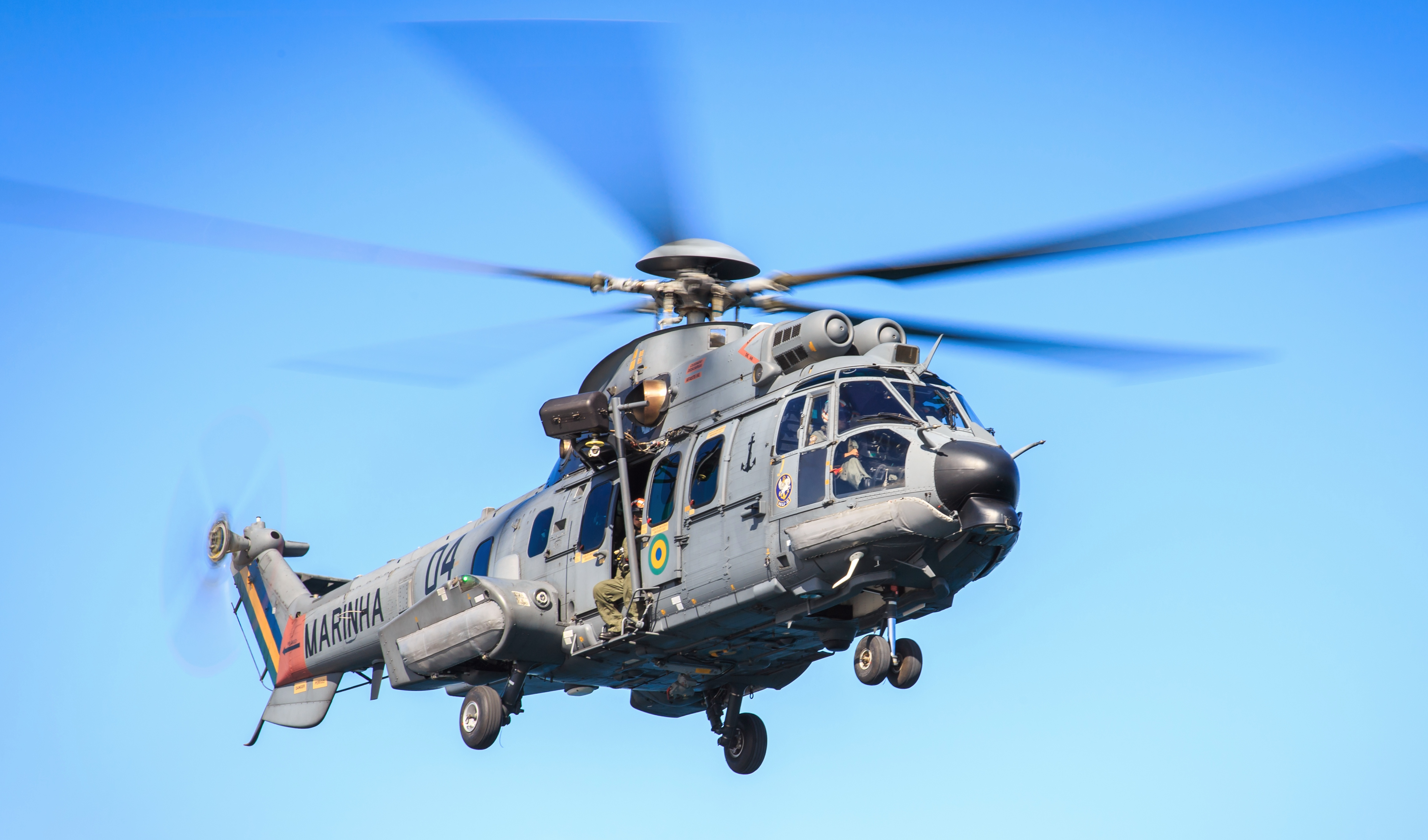
  A Brazilian Navy EC725 helicopter
- Brazilian Naval Aviation (Brazilian Navy)
- People's Liberation Army Naval Air Force (Chinese People's Liberation Army Navy)
- Republic of China Naval Aviation Command (Republic of China Navy)
- Chilean Navy Aviation (Chilean Navy)
- Colombian Naval Aviation (Colombian Navy)
- Department of Aviation (United States Marine Corps)
- Flotilla de Aeronaves (FLOAN) (Spanish Navy)
- French Naval Aviation (French Navy)
- Marineflieger (German Navy)
- Navy Aviation Command (Hellenic Navy)
- Indian Naval Air Arm (Indian Navy)
- Indonesian Naval Aviation Center (Indonesian Navy)
- Islamic Republic of Iran Navy Aviation (Islamic Republic of Iran Navy)
- Italian Naval Aviation (Italian Navy)
- Fleet Air Force (Japan Maritime Self-Defense Force)
- Air Wing Six (Republic of Korea Navy)
- Royal Malaysian Navy Aviation (Royal Malaysian Navy)
- Mexican Naval Aviation (Mexican Navy)
- Aviacion Naval Espanola (Spanish Navy)
- Pakistan Naval Air Arm (Pakistan Navy)
- Peruvian Naval Aviation (Peruvian Navy)
- Polish Naval Aviation (Polish Navy)
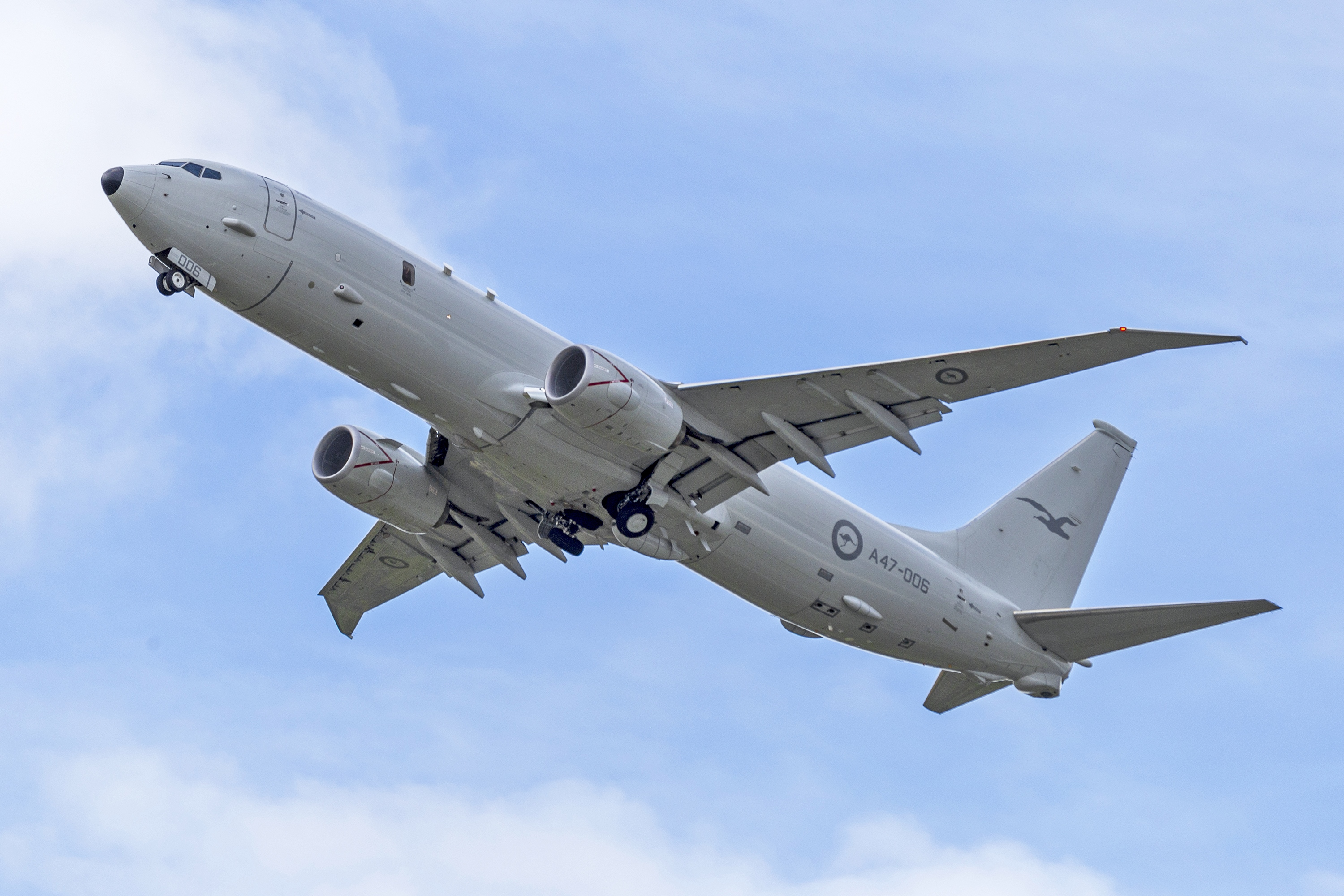
  Although operated by the RAAF the Boeing P-8A flies patrol for naval operations
- Portuguese Naval Aviation (Portuguese Navy)
- Russian Naval Aviation (Russian Navy)
- Royal Thai Naval Air Division (Royal Thai Navy)
- Turkish Naval Aviation (Turkish Navy)
- Ukrainian Naval Aviation (Ukrainian Navy)
- Fleet Air Arm (United Kingdom Royal Navy)
- United States Naval Air Forces (United States Navy)
- Naval Air Force, Vietnam People's Navy (Vietnam People's Navy)

=== Former ===
- K.u.K. Seefliegerkorps (Austro-Hungarian Navy)
- Naval Air Service (Greece) (Greece Navy)
- Imperial Japanese Navy Air Service (Imperial Japanese Navy)
- Netherlands Naval Aviation Service (Royal Netherlands Navy)
- Royal Naval Air Service (Royal Navy)
- Soviet Naval Aviation (Soviet Navy)

== See also ==
- Aerial warfare
- Military aviation
- Army aviation
- List of naval air forces
- Modern United States Navy carrier air operations
- Naval air squadron
- Police aviation
