= Thomas Nash (RAF officer) =

British World War I flying ace

Thomas Walter Nash
- Born: 25 November 1891; Acton, Middlesex, England
- Died: 23 October 1918 (aged 26) †; Vicinity of Dendermonde, Belgium
- Burial place: Cement House Cemetery, Langemark, Belgium; 50°54′17″N 2°54′25″E
- Military career
- Allegiance: United Kingdom
- Branch: Royal Naval Air Service; Royal Air Force
- Service years: 1917–1918
- Rank: Captain
- Unit: No. 4 Squadron RNAS/No. 204 Squadron RAF
- Conflicts: World War I • Western Front
- Awards: Distinguished Flying Cross & Bar; Croix de guerre (France)

Captain Thomas Walter Nash DFC* (25 November 1891 – 23 October 1918) was a British World War I flying ace credited with eight aerial victories.

== Biography ==
Nash was born in Acton, Middlesex, the son of Thomas Walter Nash, a confectioner, and Iris Amy Nash.

He entered the Royal Naval Air Service as a temporary probationary flight officer, and following flight training was commissioned as a temporary flight sub-lieutenant on 15 February 1918. He was posted to No. 4 (Naval) Squadron, which following the merging of the Royal Naval Air Service and the Army's Royal Flying Corps on 1 April 1918 became No. 204 Squadron, Royal Air Force.

Flying a Sopwith Camel, Nash gained his first aerial victory on 22 July 1918, destroying a Rumpler C reconnaissance aircraft south of Ypres, and on 31 July he destroyed a Pfalz D.III over Roeselare. On 13 August he was appointed a flight commander with the acting rank of captain, and on 15 August he scored a double victory, destroying two Fokker D.VIIs over Menen. On 16 September Nash destroyed an observation balloon south-east of Ostend, and on 24 September gained another double victory by destroying and driving down out of control two Fokker D.VIIs over Pervijze. His eighth and final success came on 9 October when he shot down in flames a Fokker D.VII over Lichtervelde.

Early on 23 October 1918, Nash led a patrol from 204 Squadron which was attacked over Dendermonde by twelve aircraft from Marinefeldjasta 1. Nash was shot down and killed, alongside four other pilots from his squadron; Lieutenants Frederick Gordon Bayley and Osbourne J. Orr, Second Lieutenant G. Sutcliffe and Sergeant Cecil M. A. Mahon. Credit for the five kills was awarded to Oberleutnant zur See Gotthard Sachsenberg and Vizeflugmeister Alexander Zenzes.

For his actions on 15 August Nash was awarded the Distinguished Flying Cross, which was gazetted posthumously on 1 November 1918. His citation read:

Lieutenant Thomas Walter Nash (Sea Patrol).

"After four months' excellent service as a pilot this officer was appointed Flight Commander. His brilliant leadership has fully justified his selection. On a recent patrol his formation accounted for six enemy 'planes, he himself destroying two. We suffered no casualties, mainly owing to the skill and judgment displayed by Lieutenant Nash."

A few days later, on 5 November, permission was granted to accept the Croix de Guerre (with Palm) awarded by the French government for his services in Flanders. On 1 January 1919 Nash was awarded a Bar to his Distinguished Flying Cross.

Nash is buried at the Cement House Cemetery, Langemark, Belgium, and is also commemorated on his family grave in the churchyard of St Lawrence's Church, West Wycombe, Buckinghamshire.
