= Hunnisett =

Hunnisett is a surname. Notable people with the surname include:

- Abbie Hunnisett (born 1995), British parasport athlete
- Edwin Edward Hunnisett (1896–1918), British aviator
