= Heinz Sachsenberg =

German World War II flying ace

- Born: 12 July 1922; Dessau, Germany
- Died: 17 June 1951 (aged 28); Lich, district of Gießen
- Relatives: Gotthard Sachsenberg
- Military career
- Allegiance: Nazi Germany
- Branch: Luftwaffe
- Service years: 1941–1945
- Rank: Leutnant (second lieutenant)
- Nickname: Wimmersal
- Units: JG 52, JG 7, JV 44
- Commands: Protection Squadron of JV 44(Squadron Leader)
- Awards: Knight's Cross of the Iron Cross

Heinz Sachsenberg (12 July 1922 – 17 June 1951) was a German World War II fighter ace who served in the Luftwaffe. He was also a recipient of the Knight's Cross of the Iron Cross, the highest award in the military and paramilitary forces of Nazi Germany during World War II. Sachsenberg claimed 104 aerial victories, all of which on the Eastern Front. He was severely injured on 23 August 1944 in aerial combat with United States Army Air Forces. At the end of the war, Sachsenberg briefly led the Platzschutzstaffel, or airfield-protection squadron, of Jagdverband 44, an elite unit flying the Messerschmitt Me 262 jet fighter. He died on 17 June 1951 of complications from wounds he had received on 23 August 1944.

== Early life ==
Sachsenberg was born on 12 July 1922 in Dessau then in the Free State of Anhalt within the Weimar Republic. "Heino", also called "Wimmersal" by his comrades, was the nephew of Gotthard Sachsenberg, a World War I fighter pilot and recipient of the Pour le Mérite. He had a brother also named Gotthard, who also served in the Luftwaffe, and was killed in action on 8 March 1944 during a night fighter mission. Sachsenberg had been nicknamed "Wimmersal" for his sharp tongue, and his love for crude songs and poems. "Wimmersal", alternatively "Vimasal", is a character from a poem, a Middle Ages squire. The poem was written with ambiguous wording about manhood. Sachsenberg joined the military service of the Luftwaffe and following flight training, (Note: Flight training in the Luftwaffe progressed through the levels A1, A2 and B1, B2, referred to as A/B flight training. A training included theoretical and practical training in aerobatics, navigation, long-distance flights and dead-stick landings. The B courses included high-altitude flights, instrument flights, night landings and training to handle the aircraft in difficult situations.) he was posted to the 6. Staffel (6th squadron) of Jagdgeschwader 52 (JG 52—52nd Fighter Wing) in late 1942. At the time, the Staffel was under the command of Oberleutnant Rudolf Resch and subordinated to II. Gruppe (2nd group) of JG 52 headed by Hauptmann Johannes Steinhoff.

== World War II ==
World War II in Europe had begun on Friday, 1 September 1939 when German forces invaded Poland. In June 1941, German forces had launched Operation Barbarossa, the invasion of the Soviet Union, which created the Eastern Front. On 13 March 1943, II. Gruppe of JG 52 moved to an airfield at Anapa. The commanding officers had also changed, 6. Staffel was now led by Oberfeldwebel Willi Nemitz while the Gruppe was commanded by Hauptmann Helmut Kühle. Here on 21 April, Sachsenberg claimed his first aerial victory, shooting down an Ilyushin Il-2 ground attack aircraft 12 kilometres (7.5 miles) southwest of Novorossiysk. On 5 May, Sachsenberg was shot down in his Messerschmitt Bf 109 G-4, (Werknummer 14956—factory number) by a Supermarine Spitfire in combat 6 km (3.7 mi) northeast of Anapa. By end of May, he had claimed eight aerial victories and had been awarded both classes of the Iron Cross (Eisernes Kreuz).

II./JG 52 insignia

By the end of July 1943, Sachsenberg had claimed 22 aerial victories in air combat over the Kuban bridgehead. His unit was then transferred to cover the retreat from the southern Kursk salient where he scored a further 16 victories. After a spell of leave from September to November due to overstress, he returned to the Crimea and the intense air-battles over the Kerch Straits. During this period, Sachsenberg was awarded the Honor Goblet of the Luftwaffe (Ehrenpokal der Luftwaffe) on 11 October followed by the German Cross in Gold (Deutsches Kreuz in Gold) on 17 October. On 2 November, the Gruppe moved to Baherove on the Crimean peninsula where they were based until 19 March 1944. By the end of December 1943, Sachsenberg's number of aerial victories claimed had increased to 52, making him the seventh most successful active fighter pilot in II. Gruppe at the time.

After 76 victories, and on leave, Sachsenberg was recommended for the Knight's Cross of the Iron Cross (Ritterkreuz des Eisernen Kreuzes) in March 1944. Upon returning to the Crimea at the beginning of May, he shot down 25 aircraft in just a month including six aircraft on 7 May, making him an "ace-in-a-day" for the first time. On 31 May, over Iași, in the battles for Romania, he claimed four aerial victories, three Bell P-39 Airacobra and a single Yakovlev Yak-1. On 8 June, Sachsenberg claimed five further aerial victories, another "ace-in-a-day" achievement, bringing his total to 101 airial victories. He was the 76th Luftwaffe pilot to achieve the century mark. Fahnenjunker-Feldwebel Sachsenberg was awarded the Knight's Cross on 9 June 1944, at the time credited with 101 aerial victories.

Returning from leave, his unit was then transferred to cover the Ploiești oilfields in Romania. On 23 August 1944, he was seriously wounded during an air battle with United States Army Air Forces (USAAF) North American P-51 Mustang fighters, (Note: The documented events of this day are contradictory. The report filed with the Deutsche Dienststelle (WASt) states that Sachsenberg was shot down by four United States Army Air Forces (USAAF) North American P-51 Mustang fighters on 23 August 1944 at 11:20 in area on the northern edge of Reni, located approximately 10 kilometers (6.2 miles) east of Galați. However, USAAF records of the Fifteenth Air Force show that no USAAF fighter pilot claimed an aerial victory over Romania that day. In consequence, Sachsenberg may have been shot down by Soviet fighters. Helmut Lipfert, Sachsenberg's wingman on this mission, also states that Sachsenberg was shot down by Soviet fighters, crash landing near a field hospital.) fighters resulting in a forced landing of his Bf 109 G-6, (Werknummer 166233) "Yellow 1". Following hospitalization, Sachsenberg was sent to the fighter pilot recreation facility at Bad Wiessee for a period of rest and recovery. The pyrotechnic flare material of a tracer round slowed the healing process.

Promoted to Leutnant (second lieutenant), Sachsenberg returned to his unit in early 1945. At the time, II. Gruppe was based at Veszprém in Hungary. Here on 3 March, Sachsenberg claimed a USAAF P-51 shot down. Following a series of relocations, the Gruppe reached Brünn, now Brno, on 14 April. Here, Sachsenberg claimed his final aerial victory, a Soviet Bell P-39 Airacobra shot down on 16 April.

=== The Sachsenberg Schwarm ===
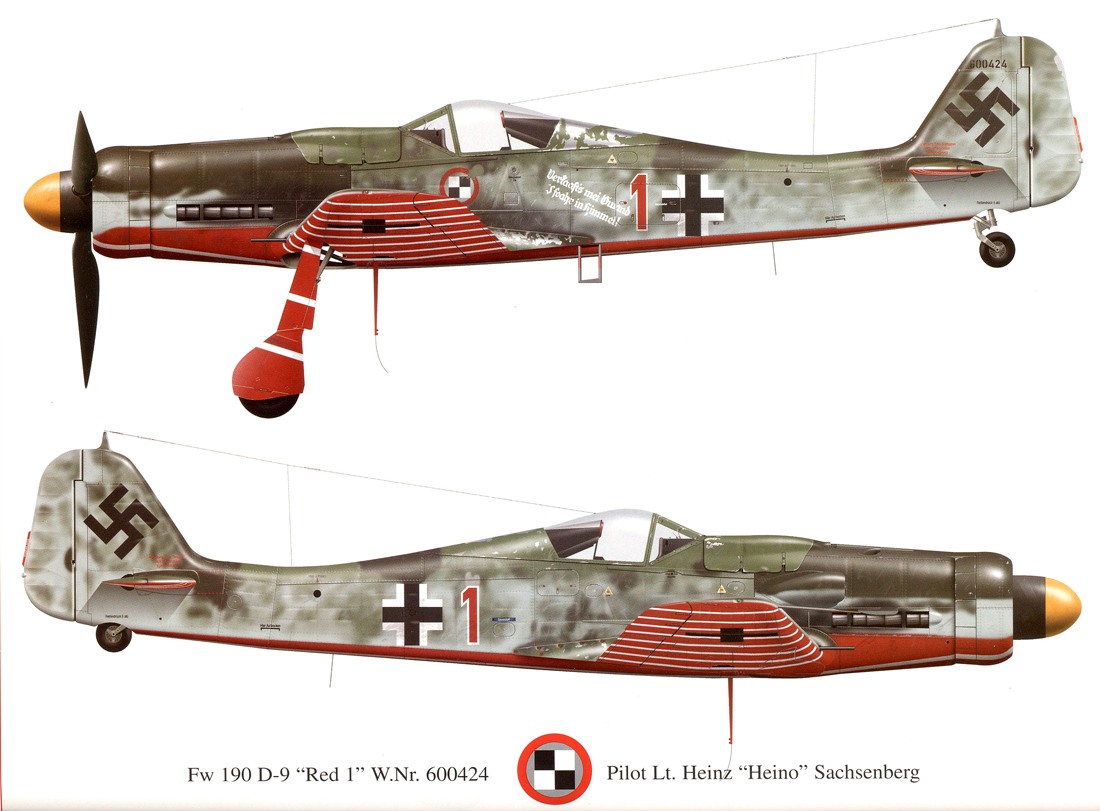
Fw 190 D-9 flown by Sachsenberg

In 1945, he transferred briefly to jet fighters in Jagdgeschwader 7 (JG 7—7th Fighter Wing) as Staffelkapitän (squadron leader) of 9. Staffel of JG 7, but in April 1945 he joined Jagdverband 44 (JV 44—44th Fighter Detachment) based at Munich-Riem. His task was to provide top cover for the Messerschmitt Me 262 jet fighters during takeoff and landing. Sachsenberg was assigned as Staffelkapitän of the Platzschutzstaffel or airfield-protection squadron, flying the Focke-Wulf Fw 190 D-9 fighter. As squadron commander, his particular aircraft was known as "Red 1". The inscription on his Fw 190 D-9 was "Verkaaft's mei Gwand I foahr in Himmel!" meaning "Sell my clothes I'm going to heaven" in a Bavarian dialect. The Me 262 jet was vulnerable to strafing attacks during takeoff and landing. Generalleutnant Adolf Galland, the commanding officer of JV 44, ordered the formation of the Platzschutzstaffel. Already in 1944, III. Gruppe of Jagdgeschwader 54 (JG 54—54th Fighter Wing), flying the Fw 190 D, had provided fighter protection to Kommando Nowotny, the first experimental Me 262 jet fighter unit.

The aircraft in the protection squadron were painted red on their underbelly with prominent white stripes to help in their identification by ground crews. On 28 April, Galland moved JV 44 to Maxglan Airfield, near Salzburg while the remaining aircraft of the Platzschutzstaffel were to fly to Ainring. The next day, Sachsenberg led four Fw 190 D-9 to Ainring. His flight included Oberleutnant Klaus Faber, Hauptmann Waldemar Wübke and Leutnant Karl-Heinz Hofmann. On 4 May, JV 44 surrendered to U.S. forces, the pilots taken prisoner of war. Sachsenberg, accompanied by Klaus Neuman, Bodo Dischauer, Hofmann and Wübke, took off with whatever means they found.

== Later life ==
Sachsenberg died on 17 June 1951 at the age of 28 in Lich, West Germany of complications from wounds he had received on 23 August 1944.

== Summary of career ==
=== Aerial victory claims ===
According to US historian David T. Zabecki, Sachsenberg was credited with 104 aerial victories. Obermaier and Spick also list him with 104 aerial victories, claimed in 520 combat missions, one on the Western Front and 103 on the Eastern Front and a mission-to-claim ratio of 5.00. He was also credited with the destruction of one fast attack craft. Mathews and Foreman, authors of Luftwaffe Aces — Biographies and Victory Claims, researched the German Federal Archives and found records for 104 aerial victory claims, 103 aerial victories on the Eastern Front and one on the Western Front.

Victory claims were logged to a map-reference (PQ = Planquadrat), for example "PQ 34 Ost 7545". The Luftwaffe grid map (Jägermeldenetz) covered all of Europe, western Russia and North Africa and was composed of rectangles measuring 15 minutes of latitude by 30 minutes of longitude, an area of about 360 square miles (930 km^{2}). These sectors were then subdivided into 36 smaller units to give a location area 3 km × 4 km (1.9 mi × 2.5 mi) in size.

Chronicle of aerial victories
This and the ♠ (Ace of spades) indicates those aerial victories which made Sachsenberg an ace-in-a-day, a term which designates a fighter pilot who has shot down five or more airplanes in a single day. This and the – (dash) indicates unconfirmed aerial victory claims for which Sachsenberg did not receive credit. This and the ? (question mark) indicates information discrepancies listed by Barbas, Prien, Stemmer, Rodeike, Balke, Bock, Mathews and Foreman.
Claim	Date	Time	Type	Location	Claim	Date	Time	Type	Location
– 6. Staffel of Jagdgeschwader 52 – Eastern Front – 4 February – 31 December 1943
1	21 April 1943	11:10	Il-2 m.H. (Note: The "m.H." refers to an Ilyushin Il-2 with rear gunner (mit Heckschütze).)	PQ 34 Ost 7545, 12 km (7.5 mi) southwest of Novorossiysk	27	6 August 1943	10:50	Yak-1	PQ 35 Ost 61394, 1 km (0.62 mi) southeast of Belgorod
2	8 May 1943	07:18	P-39	PQ 34 Ost 85142, 2 km (1.2 mi) west of Abinskaya	28	6 August 1943	10:54	Il-2 m.H.	PQ 35 Ost 61363, 3 km (1.9 mi) south of Petylowka
3	15 May 1943	09:50	P-40	PQ 34 Ost 85141, 7 km (4.3 mi) south of Krymskaya	29	7 August 1943	18:30	La-5	PQ 35 Ost 60832, 4 km (2.5 mi) northeast of Petrowkskaja
4	24 May 1943	10:04	Yak-1	PQ 34 Ost 75462, east of Kabardinka	30	8 August 1943	18:22	Boston	7 km (4.3 mi) southwest of Krassnopawlowka
5	26 May 1943	15:55	Il-2 m.H.	PQ 34 Ost 76852, 10 km (6.2 mi) northwest of Varenikovskaya	31	10 August 1943	13:34	La-5	PQ 35 Ost 71771, 1 km (0.62 mi) northwest of Sserdonka
6	27 May 1943	11:50	Il-2 m.H.	PQ 34 Ost 65241, 10 km (6.2 mi) south of Scheljesny-Rog	32	12 August 1943	05:35	Yak-1	PQ 35 Ost 41684, 5 km (3.1 mi) southwest of Achtyrka
7	29 May 1943	18:18	Il-2 m.H.	PQ 34 Ost 75231, 7 km (4.3 mi) northwest of Krymskaya	33	12 August 1943	10:50	Yak-1	PQ 35 Ost 51513, 15 km (9.3 mi) northeast of Achtyrka
8	29 May 1943	18:20? (Note: According to Barbas, Mathews and Foreman claimed at 18:18.)	Il-2 m.H.	PQ 34 Ost 76892, 5 km (3.1 mi) northeast of Kijewskoje; 5 km (3.1 mi) northeast of Krymsk	34	12 August 1943	10:53	Yak-1	PQ 35 Ost 51373, 1 km (0.62 mi) north of Dernowoje
9	5 June 1943	11:32	Yak-1	PQ 34 Ost 85114, 6 km (3.7 mi) north of Abinskaja	— (Note: This unconfirmed claim is not listed by Mathews and Foreman.)	12 August 1943	—	Yak-1	
10	5 June 1943	11:34	Yak-1	PQ 34 Ost 85112, 8 km (5.0 mi) east of Krymskaya	35	17 August 1943	06:56	Il-2 m.H.	PQ 35 Ost 41464, 1 km (0.62 mi) south-southwest of Boromlja
11	6 June 1943	07:35	La-5	PQ 34 Ost 76894, 7 km (4.3 mi) east of Kijewskoje	36	17 August 1943	09:40	Il-2 m.H.	PQ 35 Ost 51371, 5 km (3.1 mi) east-northeast of Boromlja
12	6 June 1943	07:36	La-5	PQ 34 Ost 76894, 6 km (3.7 mi) east of Kijewskoje	37	19 August 1943	16:05? (Note: According to Barbas claimed at 16:15.)	Yak-1	PQ 35 Ost 51593, 1 km (0.62 mi) west of Sewyschtschij
13	8 June 1943	09:27	Yak-1	PQ 34 Ost 76862, 8 km (5.0 mi) northwest of Imeni-Dimitrowa	38	21 August 1943	18:18	La-5	PQ 35 Ost 51593, 10 km (6.2 mi) north of Bohodukhiv
14	11 June 1943	10:19	Yak-1	PQ 34 Ost 76684, 4 km (2.5 mi) east of Sswisteljnikow	39	19 November 1943	14:29	Yak-1	PQ 34 Ost 6664, 1 km (0.62 mi) north of Baksy
15	13 June 1943	10:37	La-5	PQ 34 Ost 85144, 1 km (0.62 mi) southwest of Abinskaja	40	20 November 1943	10:17	Yak-1	PQ 34 Ost 66677, 6 km (3.7 mi) southwest of Cape Khroni
16	20 July 1943	15:05	P-39	PQ 34 Ost 75452, 8 km (5.0 mi) south of Novorossijsk	41	21 November 1943	09:48	P-39	PQ 34 Ost 66611, 6 km (3.7 mi) northeast of Bulganak
—	20 July 1943	—	P-39		42	25 November 1943	08:59	Yak-1	PQ 34 Ost 66643, northeastern edge of Kolonka
17	22 July 1943	08:15	P-39	PQ 34 Ost 76892, 6 km (3.7 mi) northeast of Kijewskoje	43	26 November 1943	13:59	Yak-1	PQ 34 Ost 66563, 7 km (4.3 mi) southwest of Kerch
18	26 July 1943	06:10	Yak-1	PQ 34 Ost 75363, 25 km (16 mi) southwest of Noworossijsk; Black Sea, southeast of Anapa	44	28 November 1943	07:10	Yak-1	PQ 34 Ost 6685, 12 km (7.5 mi) southeast of Cape Tusla
19	26 July 1943	06:20	Il-2 m.H.	PQ 34 Ost 65293, 30 km (19 mi) southwest of Anapa	45	4 December 1943	11:56	Yak-1	PQ 34 Ost 66673, 6 km (3.7 mi) west of Kossa Tusla
20	26 July 1943	10:25	Yak-1	PQ 34 Ost 76882, 1 km (0.62 mi) southeast of Kesslerowa	46	5 December 1943	07:15	Yak-1	PQ 34 Ost 66813, 12 km (7.5 mi) west of Taman; 12 km (7.5 mi) west of Kossa Tusla
21	26 July 1943	18:20	Yak-1	PQ 34 Ost 75262, 2 km (1.2 mi) south of Krymskaya	47	5 December 1943	12:30	P-39	PQ 34 Ost 66841, 9 km (5.6 mi) south of Kossa Tusla
22	30 July 1943	06:25	Yak-1	PQ 34 Ost 75234, 2 km (1.2 mi) west of Krymskaya	48	6 December 1943	10:35	MiG-3	PQ 34 Ost 66842, 6 km (3.7 mi) southwest of Taman
23	4 August 1943	11:12	Yak-1	PQ 35 Ost 61383, 5 km (3.1 mi) southeast of Orlovka	49	7 December 1943	14:50	P-39	PQ 34 Ost 66811, 12 km (7.5 mi) west of Taman
24	4 August 1943	13:40	La-5	PQ 35 Ost 61363, 10 km (6.2 mi) southeast of Tomarovka	50	7 December 1943	14:55	P-39	PQ 34 Ost 66812, 9 km (5.6 mi) northwest of Taman
25	4 August 1943	13:47? (Note: According to Barbas, Mathews and Foreman claimed at 13:41.)	La-5	PQ 35 Ost 61271, 5 km (3.1 mi) northwest of Gostschtschewo	51	31 December 1943	14:18	Il-2 m.H.	PQ 34 Ost 66522, 3 km (1.9 mi) northwest of Kesy vicinity of Felsen Nowyj Sswet
26	4 August 1943	16:00	R-5	PQ 35 Ost 51292, 10 km (6.2 mi) southeast of Rahinoje	52	31 December 1943	15:20	P-39	PQ 34 Ost 66521, 5 km (3.1 mi) northeast of Tschokrak
– 6. Staffel of Jagdgeschwader 52 – Eastern Front – 1 January 1944 – 16 March 1945
53	3 January 1944	11:15	Yak-7	PQ 34 Ost 66644, 5 km (3.1 mi) east of Kolonka; 5 km (3.1 mi) east of Kolonka	79♠	7 May 1944	14:25	Il-2 m.H.	PQ 34 Ost 35612; Black Sea, 10 km (6.2 mi) south of Sevastopol
54	17 January 1944	09:04	P-39	PQ 34 Ost 66641, 4 km (2.5 mi) north-northwest of Baksy southeast of Kerch	80♠	7 May 1944	14:40	Yak-7	PQ 34 Ost 35453; 15 km (9.3 mi) east of Sevastopol
55	17 January 1944	11:37	P-39	8 km (5.0 mi) north of Adshim-Uschkaj north-northwest of Baksy; 2 km (1.2 mi) southeast of Kerch	81♠	7 May 1944	18:05	P-39	PQ 34 Ost 35612; Black Sea, 10 km (6.2 mi) south of Sevastopol
56	17 January 1944	14:40	P-39? (Note: According to Barbas, Mathews and Foreman claimed as a Yakovlev Yak-7.)	PQ 34 Ost 66564, 2 km (1.2 mi) southeast of Kerch; Adshim-Uschkaj; 8 km (5.0 mi) north of Adshim-Uschkaj	82♠	7 May 1944	18:25	Yak-7	PQ 34 Ost 35443 vicinity of Sevastopol
57	18 January 1944	09:32	Yak-7	PQ 34 Ost 66641, 5 km (3.1 mi) north of Baksy north of Baksy	83	8 May 1944	15:40	Yak-7	PQ 34 Ost 35472 vicinity of Balaklava; 10 km (6.2 mi) south of Sevastopol
58	22 January 1944	13:28	P-39	PQ 34 Ost 66544, 3 km (1.9 mi) southwest of Bagerovo	84	9 May 1944	11:35	Il-2 m.H.	PQ 34 Ost 35611 vicinity of Balaklava; Black Sea, 10 km (6.2 mi) south of Sevastopol
59	22 January 1944	13:40	Yak-7	PQ 34 Ost 66532, 2 km (1.2 mi) northwest of Cape Tarchan; Cape Tarchan	85	9 May 1944	11:38	Yak-7	PQ 34 Ost 35472 vicinity of Balaklava; 10 km (6.2 mi) south of Sevastopol
60	23 January 1944	07:25	P-39	PQ 34 Ost 66613, 2 km (1.2 mi) west of Cape Khroni; Cape Khroni	86	9 May 1944	11:43	Yak-7	PQ 34 Ost 35473 vicinity of Balaklava; 10 km (6.2 mi) south of Sevastopol
61	24 January 1944	07:10	Yak-1	PQ 34 Ost 66643, 3 km (1.9 mi) east of Kolonka	87	30 May 1944	11:42	P-39	PQ 24 Ost 78623 vicinity of Huși; 8 km (5.0 mi) north of Iași
62	24 January 1944	12:48	Yak-1	PQ 34 Ost 66594, 5 km (3.1 mi) east of Kamysch-Burun; Kamysch-Burun	88	30 May 1944	17:27? (Note: According to Barbas, Mathews and Foreman claimed at 17:24.)	P-39	PQ 24 Ost 78672 vicinity of Sulani
63	7 February 1944	11:05	Yak-7	1 km (0.62 mi) southwest of Adshim-Uschkaj; Adshim-Uschkaj	89	31 May 1944	08:45	P-39	PQ 24 Ost 78812, north of Iași vicinity of Iași; 10 km (6.2 mi) south of Iași
64	7 February 1944	13:43	Yak-9	PQ 34 Ost 66532, 3 km (1.9 mi) north of Cape Tarchan north of Cape Tarchan	90	31 May 1944	12:19	P-39	PQ 24 Ost 7864; PQ 78645; 10 km (6.2 mi) south of Tudora
65	12 February 1944	08:36	Yak-9	PQ 34 Ost 66641, 3 km (1.9 mi) east-northeast of Bulganak east-northeast of Bulganak	91	31 May 1944	16:40	Yak-1	PQ 24 Ost 78643; 10 km (6.2 mi) south of Tudora
66	15 February 1944	08:37	P-39	PQ 34 Ost 66641, 1 km (0.62 mi) southeast of Bulganak southeast of Bulganak	92	31 May 1944	16:44	P-39	PQ 24 Ost 78642 vicinity of Huși; 10 km (6.2 mi) south of Tudora
67	11 March 1944	11:50	Yak-7	5 km (3.1 mi) north-northwest of Alexandrovka; Alexandrovka	93	2 June 1944	08:55	Pe-2	PQ 24 Ost 78683, northeast of Iași; 20 km (12 mi) northeast of Iași
68	11 March 1944	15:00	Yak-7	PQ 34 Ost 37854, 5 km (3.1 mi) west of Tschigary west of Tschigary	94	2 June 1944	14:47	Yak-7	PQ 24 Ost 78563; PQ 78533; 15 km (9.3 mi) west of Tudora
69	13 March 1944	08:37	Yak-7	PQ 34 Ost 56794, 5 km (3.1 mi) east of Feodosia; 3 km (1.9 mi) east of Feodosia	95	2 June 1944	16:05	P-39	PQ 24 Ost 78564; 15 km (9.3 mi) southwest of Tudora
70	13 March 1944	08:42	Il-2 m.H.	PQ 56873; 12 km (7.5 mi) east of Feodosia	96	6 June 1944	09:04	Pe-2	PQ 24 Ost 78652; PQ 48652; 30 km (19 mi) north-northeast of Bistritz
71	16 March 1944	14:15	Yak-9	PQ 34 Ost 47773, 5 km (3.1 mi) south of Tschigary; 5 km (3.1 mi) south of Tschigary	97♠	8 June 1944	10:30	La-5	PQ 24 Ost 78551; 25 km (16 mi) west-southwest of Tudora
72	17 March 1944	10:05	Yak-7	PQ 34 Ost 46352, 2 km (1.2 mi) east of Karankut east of Karankut	98♠	8 June 1944	10:36	La-5	PQ 24 Ost 78552; 25 km (16 mi) west-southwest of Tudora
73	17 March 1944	13:38	Yak-7	PQ 34 Ost 47773, 5 km (3.1 mi) southwest of Tschigary southwest of Tschigary	99♠	8 June 1944	13:13	P-39	PQ 24 Ost 78562; 15 km (9.3 mi) southwest of Tudora
74	18 March 1944	16:56? (Note: According to Barbas, Mathews and Foreman claimed at 16:50.)	Yak-7	PQ 34 Ost 36283, Fedorowka	100♠	8 June 1944	13:14	P-39	PQ 24 Ost 78641; 10 km (6.2 mi) south of Tudora
75	22 March 1944	10:40	LaGG-3	PQ 34 Ost 66538, 8 km (5.0 mi) south of Cape Tarchan vicinity of Cape Tarchan	101♠	8 June 1944	19:22	Il-2 m.H.	PQ 24 Ost 78592; 15 km (9.3 mi) northwest of Iași
76	22 March 1944	10:45	Yak-7? (Note: According to Barbas claimed as a Lavochkin-Gorbunov-Gudkov LaGG-3.)	PQ 34 Ost 66641; Cape Tarchan east of Bulganak	102	22 August 1944	13:25	Boston	PQ 24 Ost 97573; 5 km (3.1 mi) east of Serpnewoje (Leipzig)
77♠	7 May 1944	08:34	Yak-1	PQ 34 Ost 35611 vicinity of Balaklava; Black Sea, 10 km (6.2 mi) south of Sevastopol	103	3 March 1945	—	P-51	Hungary
78♠	7 May 1944	10:35	Yak-7	PQ 34 Ost 35474 vicinity of Balaklava; 10 km (6.2 mi) south of Sevastopol	104	16 April 1945	—	P-39	Hungary

=== Awards ===
- Iron Cross (1939) 2nd and 1st Class
- Honor Goblet of the Luftwaffe on 11 October 1943 as Feldwebel and pilot (Note: According to Obermaier on 2 October 1943.)
- German Cross in Gold on 17 October 1943 as Feldwebel in the 6./Jagdgeschwader 52
- Knight's Cross of the Iron Cross on 9 June 1944 as Fahnenjunker-Feldwebel and pilot in the 6./Jagdgeschwader 52
