= Stalhille =

Coordinates: 51°13′N 3°04′E

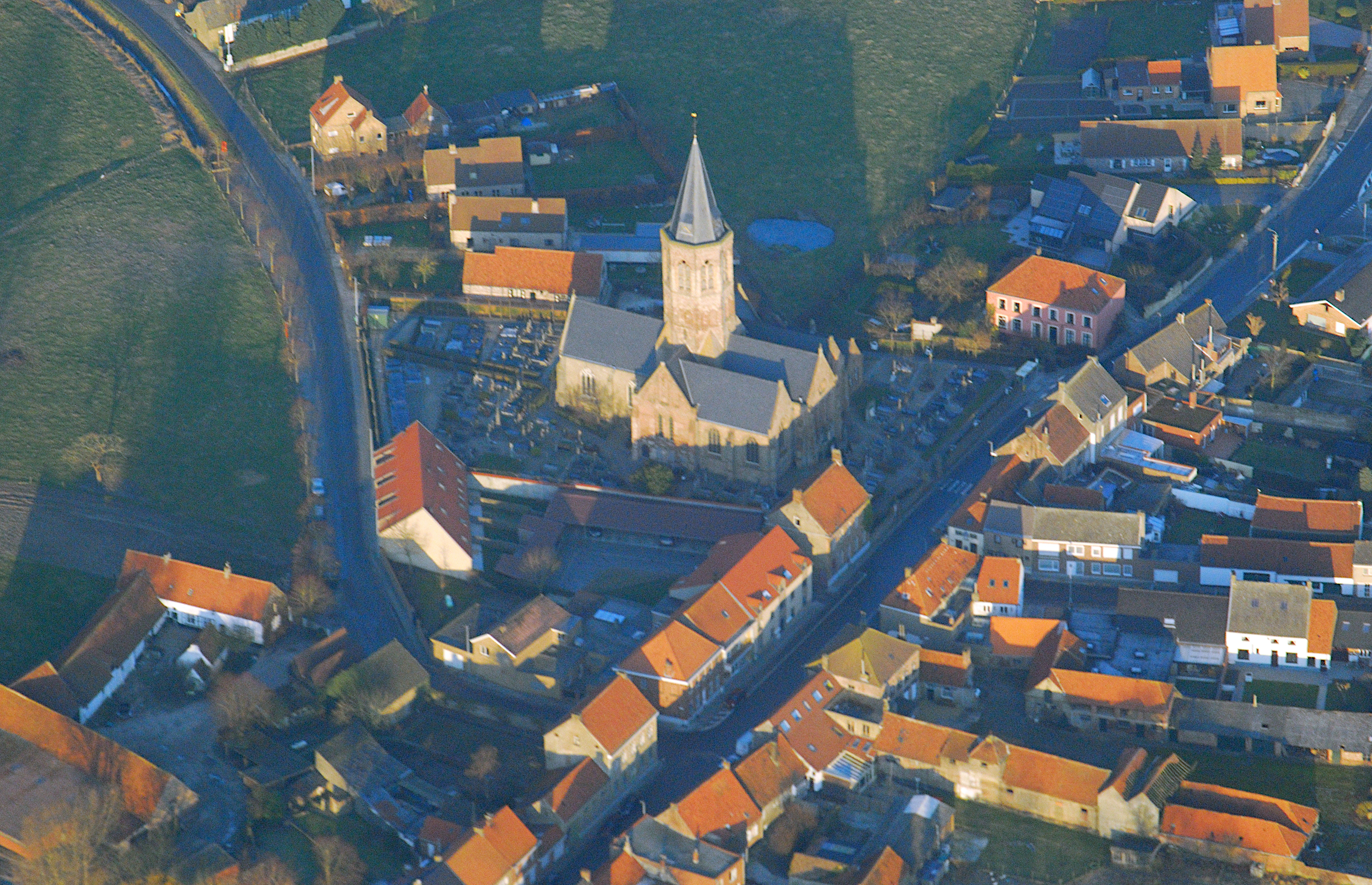
Aerial view

Stalhille is a village in the Belgian province West Flanders in Jabbeke, a municipality in Belgium. The village is located in the northern part of Jabbeke, north of the canal Brugge-Oostende.

== History ==
The name "stal-hille" means corrals and cattle on a hill. After marine transgressions in the early Middle Ages the higher located parts of Stalhille were more suitable to build houses and corrals.
