= List of naval air forces =

A list of naval air forces comprises the air forces of navies in the world.

== A ==
Country			Founded
Country	Air force Original name Current Former		Founded
Argentina	Argentine Naval Aviation; Comando de Aviación Naval Argentina		1916–present
Australia	Fleet Air Arm (RAN); Australian Navy Aviation Group or Fleet Air Arm	–	

== F ==
Country		Founded
Country	Air force Original name Current Former	Founded
France	French Naval Aviation; Force maritime de l'aéronautique navale	-present
France		1912–

== G ==
Country		Founded
Country	Air force Original name Current Former	Founded
Germany	Marineflieger	1955–present
Germany	Marineluftschiffe-Abteilung	1912–1919
Germany	Naval division of the German Empire	1911–1919

== S ==
Country		Founded
Country	Air force Original name Current Former	Founded
Spain	Aeronáutica Naval	1954–present
Spain	Aeronáutica Naval	1920–1939
Spain	Aviación Naval	1917–1920

== U ==
Country		Founded
Country	Air force Original name Current Former	Founded
United Kingdom	Fleet Air Arm	1937-present
United Kingdom	Royal Naval Air Service	1914–1918
United States	United States Naval Aviation; United States Naval Aviation	-present
United States		–
United States		–
United States		–
United States		1926–
United States	United States Marine Corps Aviation; United States Marine Corps Aviation	1912–present

== See also ==
- List of aircraft units of the Royal Navy
- List of aircraft carriers in service
