= Jabbeke =

- Municipality
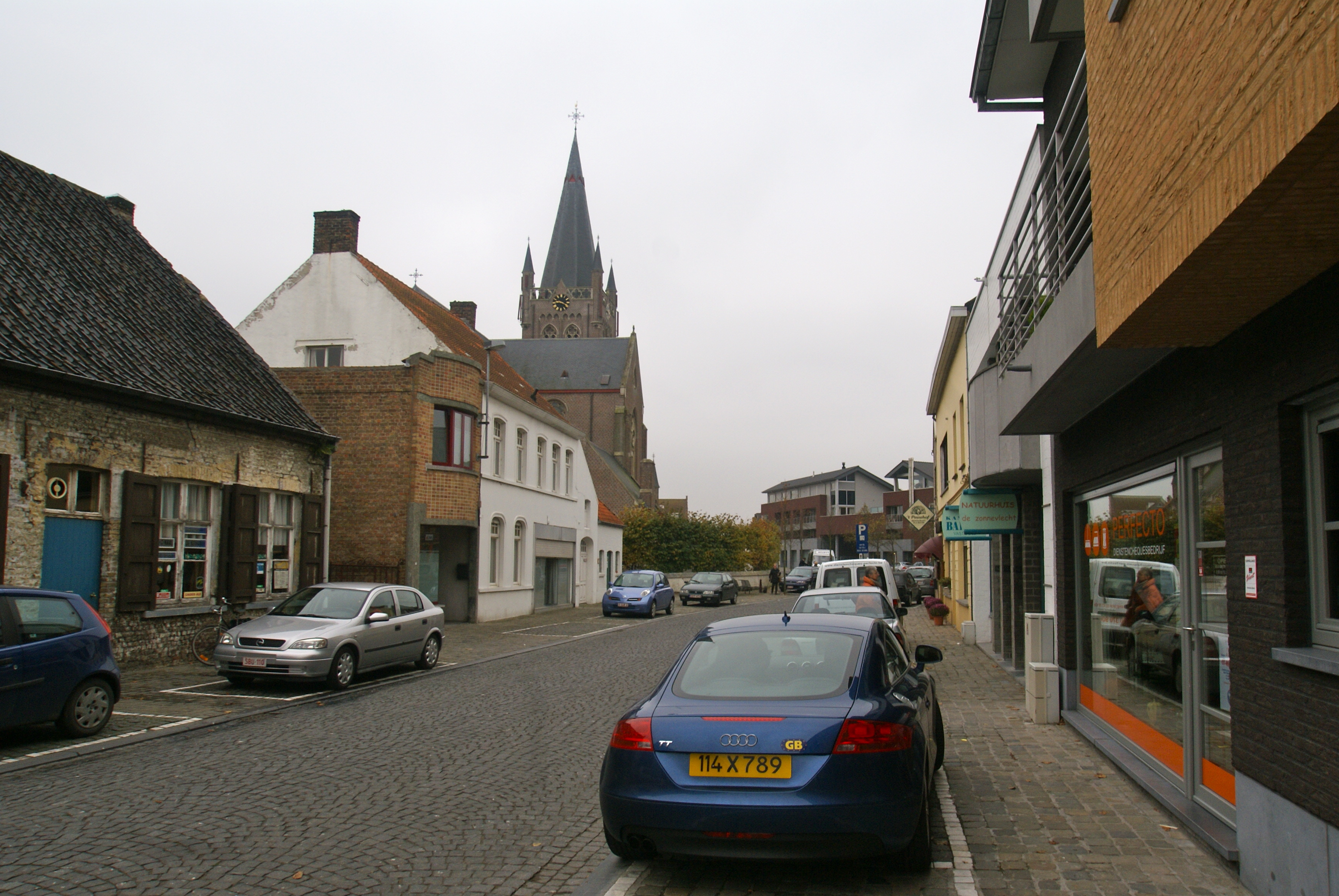

- Flag Coat of arms

- Location of Jabbeke in West Flanders
- Interactive map of Jabbeke
- Location in Belgium
- Coordinates: 51°09′N 03°14′E
- Country: Belgium
- Community: Flemish Community
- Region: Flemish Region
- Province: West Flanders
- Arrondissement: Bruges

Government
  - Mayor: Frank Casteleyn(CD&V)
  - Governing party: CD&V

Area
  - Total: 53.86 km^{2} (20.80 sq mi)

Population (2018-01-01)
  - Total: 13,880
  - Density: 257.7/km^{2} (667.5/sq mi)
- Postal codes: 8490
- NIS code: 31012
- Area codes: 050
- Website: www.jabbeke.be

Jabbeke (Dutch pronunciation: [ˈjɑbeːkə]) is a municipality located in the Belgian province of West Flanders. The municipality comprises the towns of Jabbeke proper, Snellegem, Stalhille, Varsenare and Zerkegem. On 1 January 2006 the municipality had 13,572 inhabitants. The total area is 53.76 km^{2} (20.76 sq mi), giving a population density of 252 inhabitants per km^{2}.

== Speed records ==
In the 1940s and 1950s it was renowned for the number of speed records set on a measured kilometer of highway. Not just absolute speed records, manufacturers wanted each model's maximum speed measured and certified by the Royal Automobile Club of Belgium. For example, the Healey Elliott with 110.65 mph in 1946, at the time the 'fastest car in the world in series production', the Jaguar XK120 achieved an officially timed 126 mph (202.78 km/h); the "Jabbeke Speed Record" Triumph TR2 (124.889 mph) car was driven by Ken Richardson; André Pilette set a Belgian record in the 2 litre class in the Veritas RS 206 km/h (128.00 mph); in 1952 the Rover JET 1 turbine driven by Spen King set the first speed record for gas turbine cars at 151.965 mph (244.56 km/h) over the flying kilometre; and the exotic Pegaso Z-102 clocked 250 km/h (155.34 mph) to make it the 'fastest production car in the world'.

== Famous inhabitants ==
- Constant Permeke (°1886 - 1952) was a Belgian painter who is considered the leading figure of Flemish expressionism, born in Antwerp.
- Steve Ramon (°1979), won two Motocross world championships between 1996 and 2011, born in Zerkegem.
- Romain Maes (°1912 - 1983), winner of the Tour de France in 1935, was born in Zerkegem.
- Hugo Broos (°1952), Belgian footballer and coach.
- Stijn De Smet (°1985), Belgian footballer for Cercle Brugge K.S.V., K.A.A. Gent and K.V. Kortrijk.
