= Zerkegem =

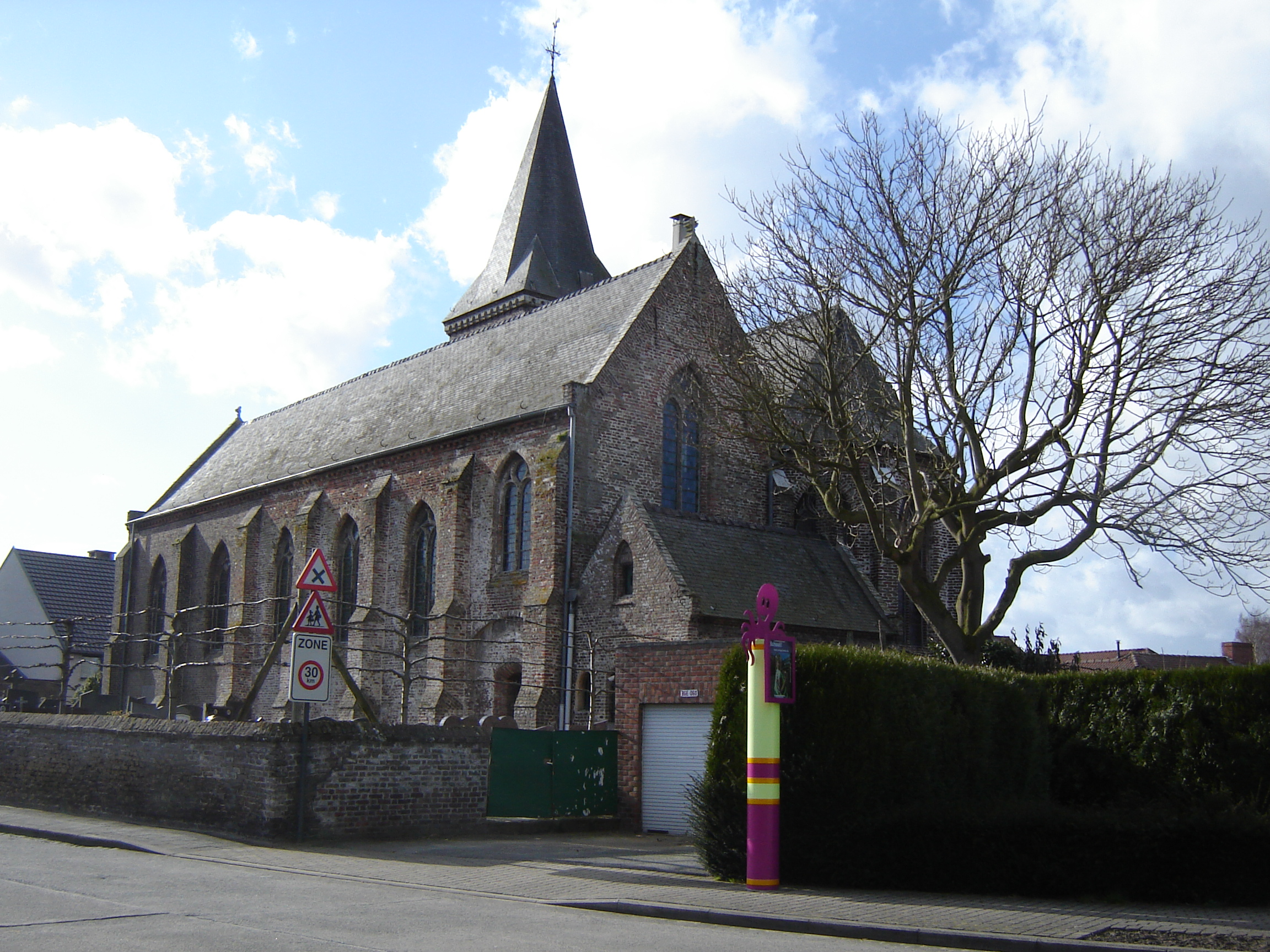
- Sint-Vedastuskerk in Zerkegem (Church of Saint Vedastus in Zerkegem).
- Interactive map of Zerkegem
- Coordinates: 51°09′59.2″N 3°04′11.8″E
- Country: Belgium
- Region: Flanders
- Municipality: Jabbeke

Zerkegem is a village in the Belgian province West Flanders in Jabbeke, a municipality in Belgium. Zerkegem is located between the Polders in the north and the sandy regions of the south.

== Famous Inhabitants ==
- Romain Maes, the 1935 winner of the Tour de France.
