= Edwin Edward Hunnisett =

British military pilot (1896–1918)

- Born: 1896; Newhaven, East Sussex, England
- Died: 30 June 1918 (aged 21–22); Belgium
- Burial place: Newhaven Cemetery, Newhaven, East Sussex, England
- Military career
- Allegiance: United Kingdom
- Branch: Royal Navy; Royal Air Force
- Rank: Serjeant Mechanic
- Units: Royal Naval Volunteer Reserve, Howe Battalion Royal Naval Division, No. 217 Squadron RAF
- Awards: Victory Medal, British War Medal

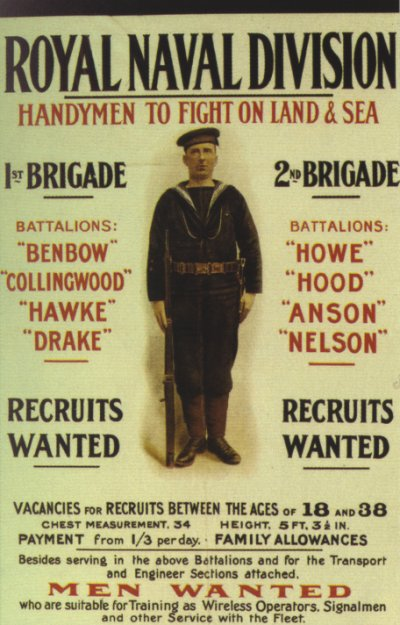
Royal Naval Division recruiting poster

Serjeant Mechanic Edwin Edward Hunnisett (1896 – 30 June 1918) was a World War I British aviator who was shot down by German flying ace Hans Goerth.

== Background ==
Edwin Hunnisett was born in 1896 in Newhaven, East Sussex, England. He was the son of Benjamin Hunnisett and his wife Harriet Sarah Daniels. His father also served in World War I, receiving the Victory Medal, British War Medal, and the 1914 Star and Clasp.

== Military career ==
Edwin Hunnisett enlisted in the Royal Naval Volunteer Reserve on 6 January 1913. He served with the Howe Battalion of the Royal Naval Division from 22 August 1914 to 27 July 1915. On 18 September 1915, he was invalided back to the United Kingdom after development of a hernia. However, Hunnisett was transferred to Dunkirk (Dunkerque) in Nord, France on 16 February 1916. As a private, he flew with Australian Flight Lieutenant Charles Jarvis Moir. However, the Australian was killed in action on 10 May 1917 while flying N6185 'A' on an escort mission. In the spring of 1918, Hunnisett became a member of the No. 217 Squadron of the Royal Air Force. By June 1918, the aviator had the rank of serjeant mechanic. His aircraft was an Airco de Havilland DH.4 with serial number A8013. Edwin Hunnisett received the Victory Medal and the British War Medal.

== Death ==
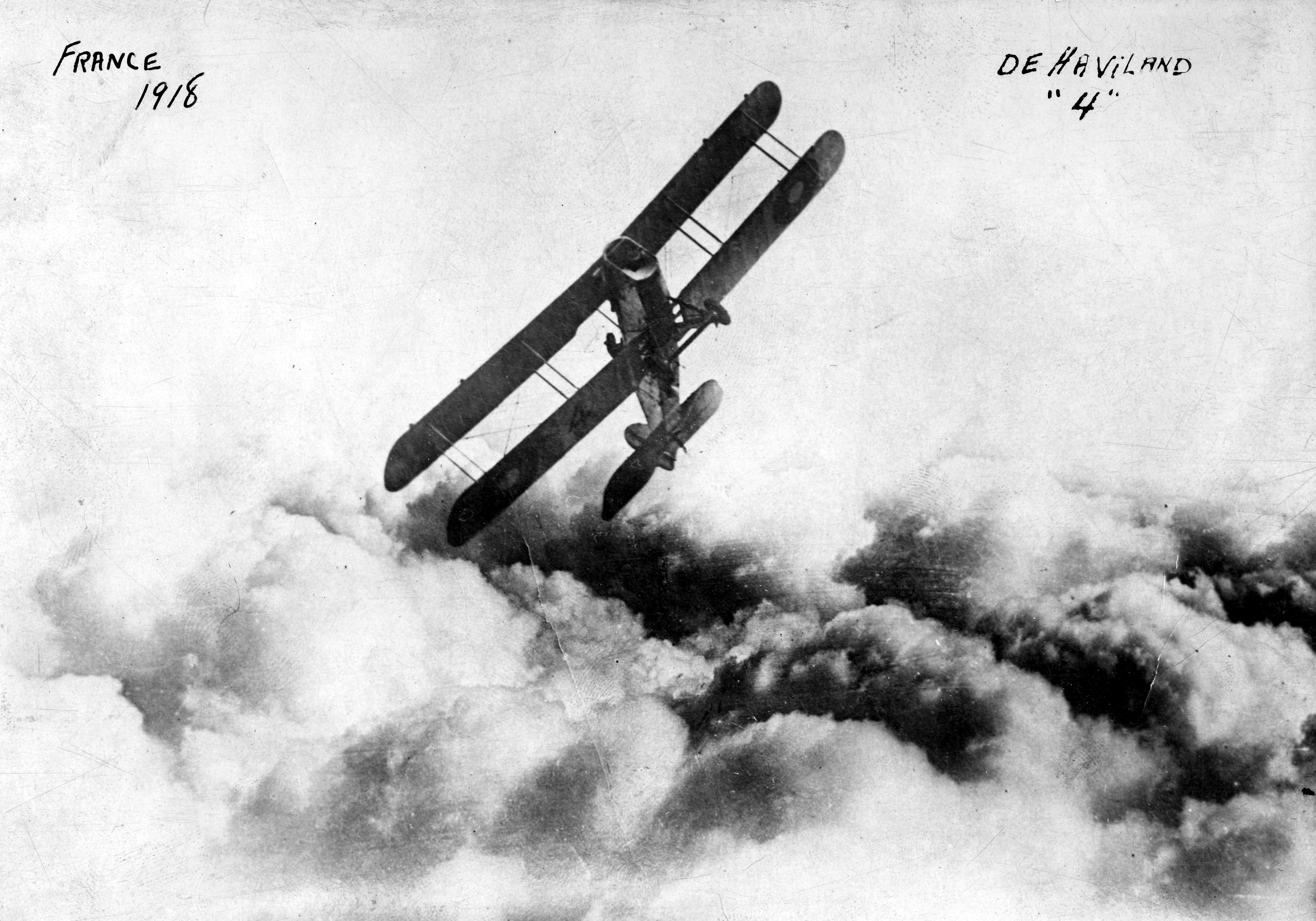
Airco de Havilland DH.4 soaring above the clouds in France

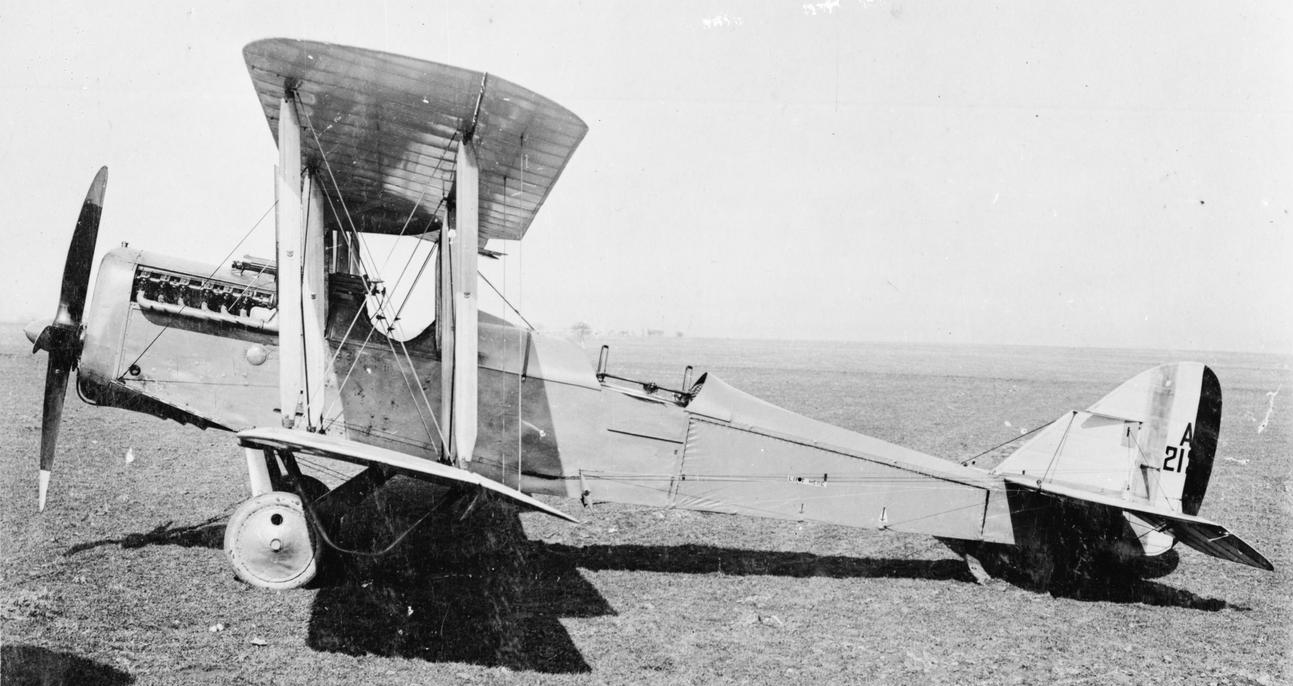
DH.4 during World War I

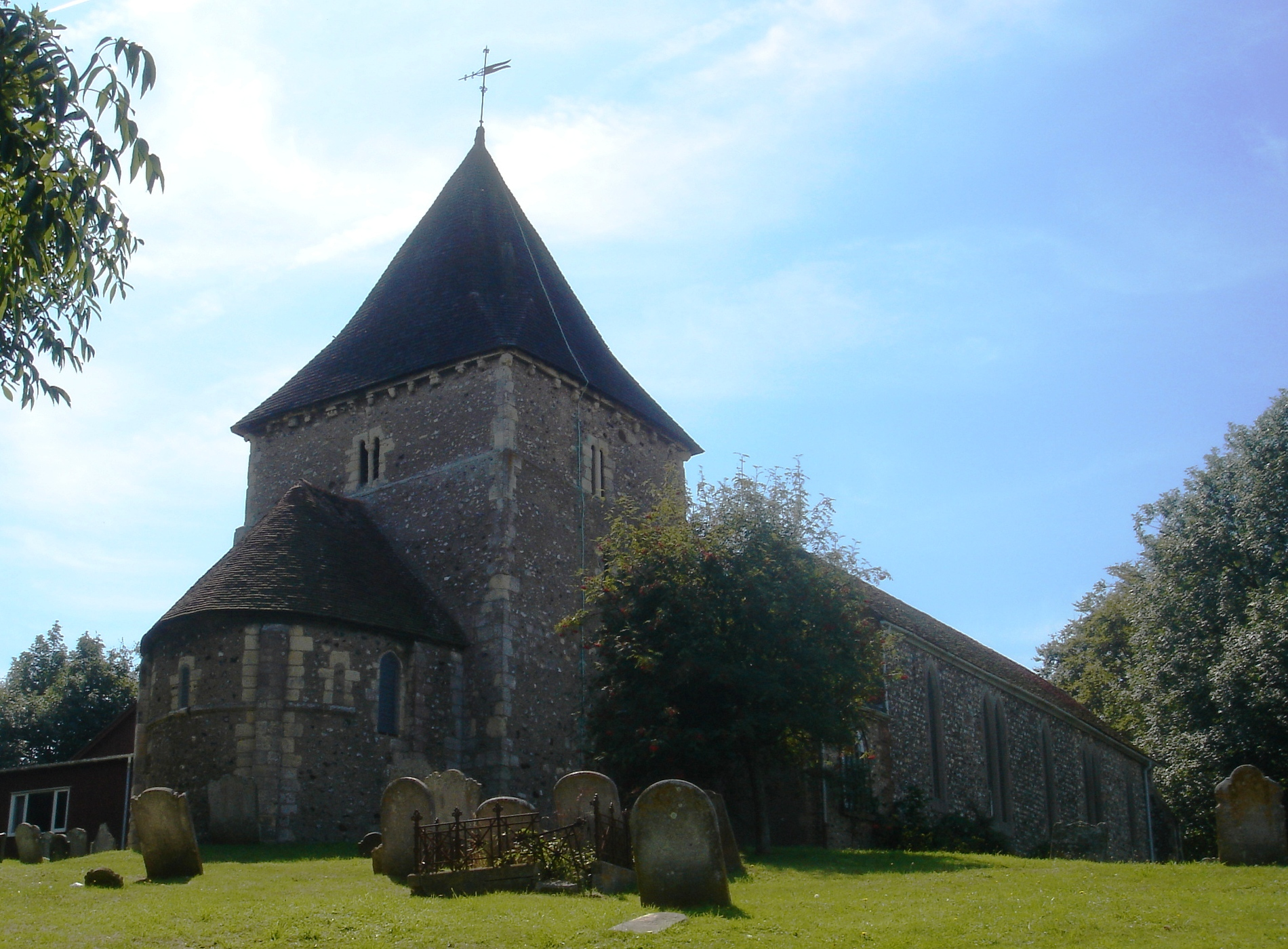
Saint Michael and All Angels Church in Newhaven, England

On the evening of 30 June 1918, Edwin Hunnisett's Airco de Havilland DH.4 (A8013) engaged in aerial combat with the Albatros D.Va with serial number 7167/18 piloted by German flying ace Hans Goerth. The plane was shot down over Mariakerke, Belgium by the Vizeflugmeister of Marine Feld Jasta III, and the serjeant mechanic, who had been acting as observer, died in the conflict. The downing of the plane was the first of seven aerial victories for Vizeflugmeister Goerth. Edwin Edward Hunnisett is commemorated on a headstone at Newhaven Cemetery in Newhaven, East Sussex, England. However, the British aviator is also represented on a second cenotaph, the Arras Flying Services Memorial, at the Faubourg d'Amiens Cemetery in Arras, Pas-de-Calais, France. There are two additional memorials which acknowledge the contribution of Serjeant Mechanic Hunnisett. One is the Newhaven War Memorial, which is located in the park adjacent to Newhaven Harbor in Newhaven, East Sussex, England. The obelisk records 127 names of the area's fallen from the Great War. The last memorial is in Saint Michael and All Angels Anglican and Methodist Church in Newhaven, East Sussex. It records 90 names of the parish's fallen, in the chronological order of their deaths.
