= Snellegem =

Town in Jabbeke, Belgium

Coordinates: 51°10′N 3°07′E

- Town
- Interactive map of Snellegem
- Country: Belgium
- Region: Flanders
- Province: West Flanders
- Arrondissement: Bruges
- Municipality: Jabbeke

Area
  - Total: 11.25 km^{2} (4.34 sq mi)
- Elevation: 12 m (39 ft)

Population (2020)
  - Total: 1,660
  - Density: 148/km^{2} (382/sq mi)
- Postal code: 8490
- Area code: 050

Snellegem is a town in Jabbeke, Belgium.

It is located between Jabbeke and Zedelgem. It is about 8 km from the city of Bruges.

== See also ==
- West Flanders
