= Alexander Zenzes =

German WWI flying ace

- Born: 10 July 1898; Chemnitz, Saxony
- Died: September 1980 (aged 82)
- Burial place: Middle Village, Queens County, New York, US
- Military career
- Allegiance: Germany
- Branch: Aviation
- Rank: Vizeflugmeister
- Unit: Marine Flieger Jagdstaffel II
- Awards: Iron Cross First Class
- Other work: Fought communists as part of the postwar Freikorps

Vizeflugmeister Alexander Zenzes (10 July 1898–September 1980) IC was a German World War I flying ace. He was a German naval pilot credited with 19 confirmed aerial victories.

After World War I, he gained a Doctorate in Engineering. In 1926, he moved to the United States. Although he became a naturalized citizen, in 1942 the Federal Bureau of Investigation suspected him of being a subversive.

== Early life ==
Alexander Zenzes was born on 10 July 1898 in Chemnitz, Saxony.

== World War I service ==
There is no information about him until he appeared on the rolls of Marine Flieger Jagdstaffel II by scoring his first aerial victory on 5 June 1918. He had run his total to six by the end of the month. He was awarded the Iron Cross First Class during the summer. On 22 July 1918, he was wounded by anti-aircraft fire. On 30 July, he was promoted to Vizeflugmeister. Two days later, on 1 August, he received more serious wounds that kept him out of action until September. Upon his return, he would score ten victories in October 1918 alone, running his total to at least 19 confirmed victories.

== Postwar life ==
Immediately postwar, Zenzes would serve in Gotthard Sachsenberg's Marine Freikorps, battling the communist insurgents.

During the early 1920s, Zenzes earned a Ph.D in Engineering. In 1926, he moved to the United States. In 1929, he applied for citizenship; he became a naturalized American in 1934. He lived in San Francisco until World War II. He worked as a clerk and a sales manager while conducting chemical research. By 1942, the Federal Bureau of Investigation suspected him of being a German agent carrying out subversion in Mexico.

He was last heard of living in New York City in the 1950s.

He died in September 1980.
