= Gotthard Sachsenberg =

German politician (1891–1961)

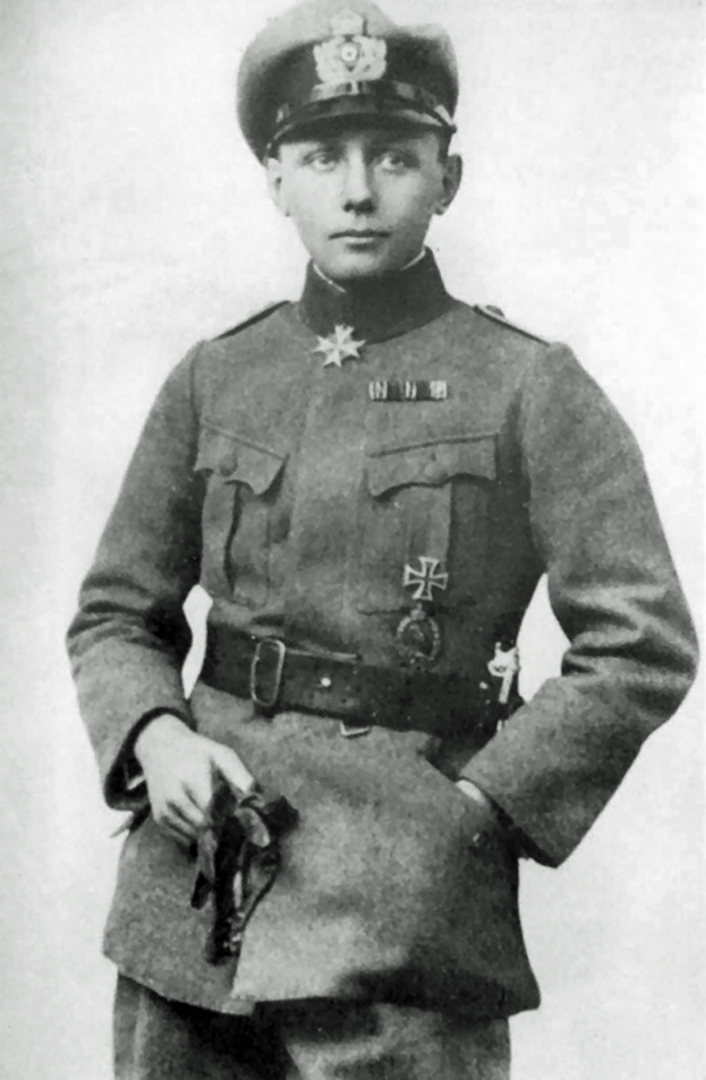
- Born: 6 December 1891; Dessau, Duchy of Anhalt, German Empire
- Died: 23 August 1961 (aged 69); Bremen, Free Hanseatic City of Bremen, West Germany
- Relatives: Heinz Sachsenberg
- Military career
- Allegiance: German Empire
- Branch: (German Empire) Marinefliegerkorps
- Service years: 1913–1920
- Rank: Oberleutnant zur See
- Units: SMS Hertha; SMS Pommern; II. Marine-Feldflieger-Abteilung
- Commands: Marine Feld Jasta I Marine jagdgruppe Flanders; Kampfgeschwader Sachsenberg
- Conflicts: First World War
- Awards: Pour le Merite; Royal House Order of Hohenzollern; Iron Cross
- Other work: Pioneered civil aviation and hydrofoils.

Gotthard Sachsenberg (6 December 1891 – 23 August 1961) was a German World War I fighter ace with 31 victories who went on to command the world's first naval air wing. In later life, he founded the airline Deutscher Aero Lloyd, became an anti-Nazi member of the German parliament, and also became a pioneering designer of hydrofoils.

== Early life and naval career ==
Gotthard Sachsenberg was born in Rosslau, north of the Elbe River near Dessau, Germany on 6 December 1891. After his initial schooling, he attended the gymnasium in Eisenach for secondary schooling preparatory to entering university. His major was economics.

He volunteered for seagoing service and became a sea cadet on the cruiser SMS Hertha on 1 April 1913. In 1914, promotion to Fähnrich zur See and transfer to the battleship SMS Pommern followed. He received the Iron Cross First Class in August, 1915 as an officer candidate, for his excellence as an artillery spotter.

== World War I ==
However, Sachsenberg was fascinated by aircraft and in December 1915 transferred to the air service. He was posted to Marine Feldflieger Abteilung II as a Fähnrich zur See observer. He was promoted to Leutnant in early 1916.

He then served as an instructor for observers. He underwent pilot training at Johannisthal, qualifying as a pilot. He then returned to MFA II to fly a Fokker Eindecker.

On 1 February 1917, Sachsenberg succeeded Oberleutnant von Santen as commanding officer of Marine Feld Jasta I. MFJ II was organized somewhat later, and the two were combined into a larger unit, Marine Jagdgruppe Flandern. Leutnant zur See Sachsenberg was appointed its commanding officer. His friend and rival ace Theo Osterkamp became commander of MGJ II.

MFJ III was later raised and added to the larger unit. Still later, two more MFJs were raised and added to the parent unit, bringing its strength up to about 50 fighter planes, comparable to an army Jagdgeschwader. Stationed on North Sea coastal airfields, the MFJ units often fought against Royal Naval Air Service aircraft who were stationed in similar circumstances.

Sachsenberg opened his score as a fighter pilot, downing a Farman and a Sopwith 1½ Strutter on 1 May 1917. He scored again on the 12th, claiming a Sopwith Pup into the sea, and then notching a double victory on 7 June to make him an ace.

On 20 August, Sachsenberg was awarded the Knight's Cross of the Royal House Order of Hohenzollern. By the end of 1917, his victory roll stood at eight.

He claimed his ninth victory on 17 March 1918, and continued to score steadily until 29 October 1918, when he downed his 31st confirmed. Midway through this run, Sachsenberg was awarded Prussia's and Germany's highest decoration, the Pour le Mérite, on 5 August 1918.

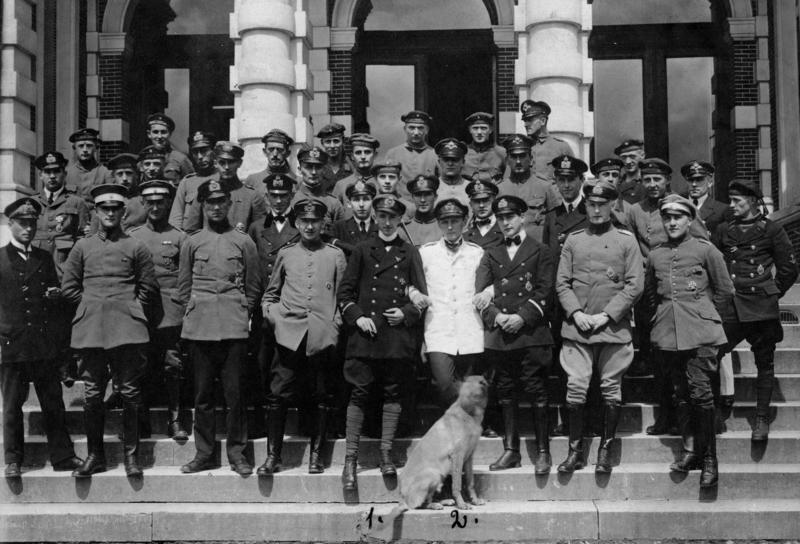
Sachsenberg (dressed in white) in 1918

The MJF switched from the Albatros to Fokker D.VIIs in June 1918. They were as colorfully and distinctively marked as Manfred von Richthofen's "Flying Circus" (Jagdgeschwader I), with the basic color scheme being yellow and black, as a yellow and black checkerboard had been Sachsenberg's personal motif, and it was spread to the entire unit, with minor variations marking the different pilots.

== Post World War I ==
Sachsenberg formed Kampfgeschwader Sachsenberg in January 1919, consisting of 700 personnel. Several of them were fellow World War I aces, such as Theo Osterkamp, Josef Jacobs, and Alexander Zenzes. Based at Riga, Latvia, it gave aerial support to the Freikorps, fighting Russian communist forces on the Baltic borders of Germany. It was successful in establishing air superiority over its opponent, and mainly flew ground support missions on behalf of the Freikorps.

He then joined with Professor Hugo Junkers, whose aircraft he had used in the Baltic, to found Aero Lloyd Airlines. Another business interest of Sachsenberg's was his brother's shipyard, building river craft and small coastal ships.

Sachsenberg became interested in politics and was elected to the German Parliament. He represented Liegnitz from May 1928 to July 1932. His taking a pacifist stance, not to mention his Jewish family members, made him anathema to the Nazis. He wrote and published articles decrying Germany's military buildup toward war, and especially its establishment of the Luftwaffe. He predicted it would bring war home to German families and German soil. In retribution for his voiced 'defeatism', the Nazis held a secret trial in absentia. Sentenced to death despite being a Member of Parliament, he was allowed to escape on his way to the firing squad and wasn't rearrested. Sachsenberg escaped the consequences of the conviction because his family shipyard was producing military ships.

In the mid-1930s, Sachsenberg allied himself with hydrofoil ship pioneer Hanns von Schertel. Hydrofoil ship speeds of more than 30 knots, faster than any warships then on water, attracted attention from the German Ministry of Transportation and Finance, the German Navy, and German Air Force. Commercial exploitation of the hydrofoil was cut short by World War II. Several military hydrofoils of differing sizes, with speeds up to 60 knots, were acquired during World War II. However, they were only prototypes, and most fell prey to war damage of some sort.

The end of World War II brought the Russian occupation of Dessau, and their acquisition of the shipyard.

Sachsenberg and Shertel set up a new hydrofoil operation named Supramar in Switzerland. In 1953, they finally saw the first commercial hydrofoil in operation between Ascona, Switzerland, and Arona, Italy, on Lake Maggiore. The hydrofoil concept gradually spread worldwide, but Sachsenberg did not live to see its general use.

He died in Bremen on 23 August 1961.

== Honors and awards ==
- Prussia:Pour le Merite: September 1918
- Prussia: Knight's Cross with Swords of the Hohenzollern House Order: 20 August 1917
- Prussia: Iron Cross Second and First Class
- Anhalt: House Order of Albert the Bear, Knight First Class with Swords
- Anhalt: Frederickscross, First and Second Class
- Oldenburg: Friedrich-August Cross First and Second Class
- Hamburg: Hanseatic Cross
- Pilot’s Badge, German Empire
