= Imperial German Navy =

Navy of the German Empire between 1871 and 1919

Imperial Navy Kaiserliche Marine
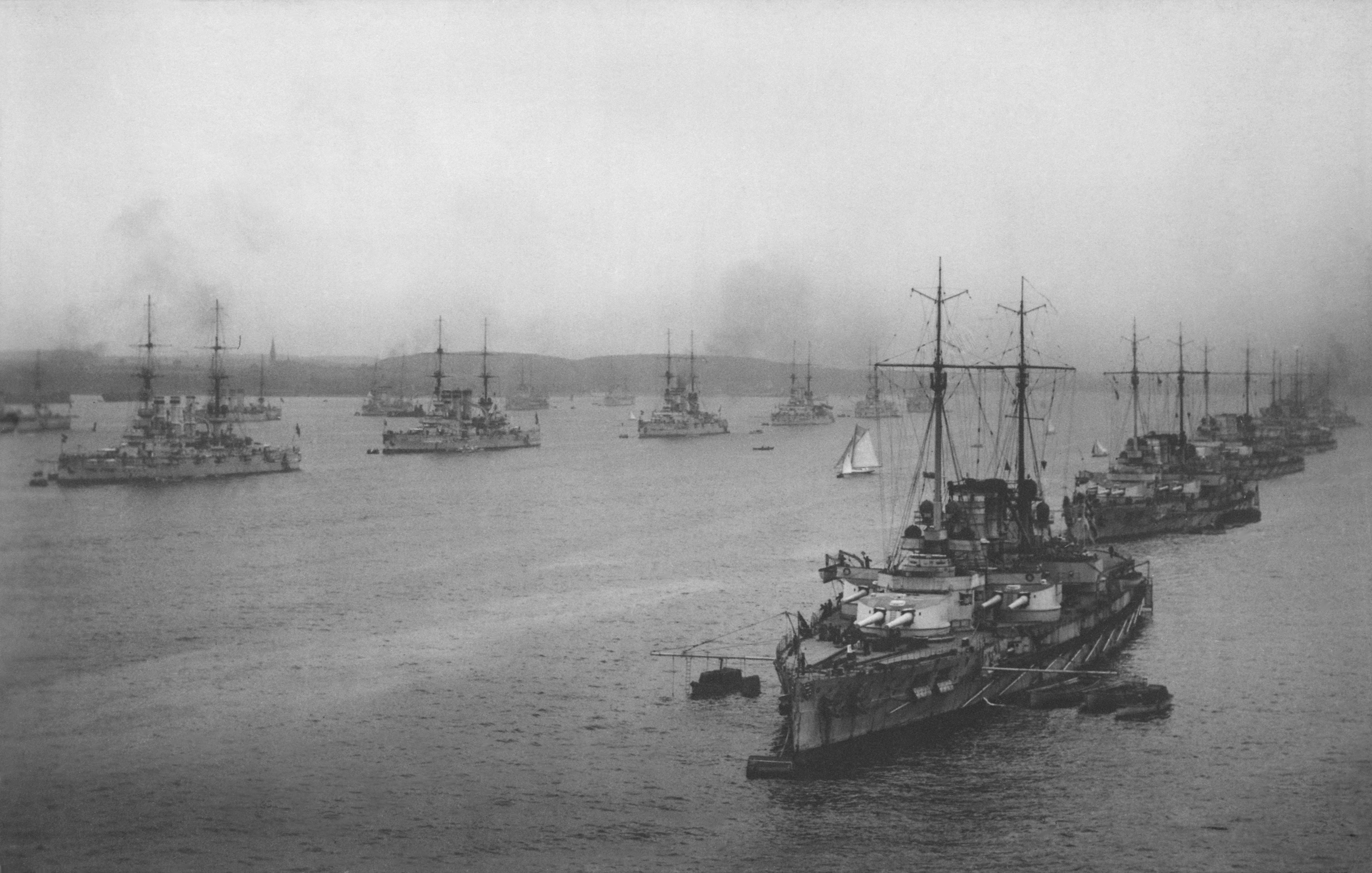
- Major elements of the High Seas Fleet in the early 1910s
- Active: 1871–1918
- Disbanded: 1919
- Country: German Empire
- Branch: Navy
- Colors: Black, white and red
- March: "Gruß an Kiel"
- Engagements: Nauruan Civil War; First Samoan Civil War; Cretan Revolt (1897–1898); Boxer Rebellion; Venezuelan crisis of 1902–1903; Sokehs Rebellion; World War I; Kiel mutiny (1918); Finnish Civil War

Commanders
- Commander-in-chief: German Emperor; Wilhelm I (1871-1888); Frederick III (1888); Wilhelm II (1888-1918); President of the Reich; Friedrich Ebert (1918-1919)
- Governing body: Imperial Admiralty (1872–1889); High Command (1889–1899); Imperial Naval Office (1889–1918); Imperial Naval Cabinet (1889–1918); Imperial Admiralty Staff (1899–1918)

Insignia
- War ensign (1903–1918)

- War ensign (1892–1903)

- War ensign (1871–1892)

- Naval jack (1903–1918)

The Imperial German Navy or the Kaiserliche Marine (Imperial Navy) was the navy of the German Empire, which existed between 1871 and 1919. It grew out of the small Prussian Navy (from 1867 the North German Federal Navy), which was mainly for coastal defence. Kaiser Wilhelm II greatly expanded the navy. The key leader was Admiral Alfred von Tirpitz, who greatly expanded the size and quality of the navy, while adopting the sea power theories of American strategist Alfred Thayer Mahan. The result was a naval arms race with Britain, as the German navy grew to become one of the greatest maritime forces in the world, second only to the Royal Navy.

The German surface navy proved ineffective during the First World War; its only major engagement, the Battle of Jutland, was a draw, but it kept the surface fleet largely in port for the rest of the war. The submarine fleet was greatly expanded and threatened the British supply system during the U-boat campaign. As part of the Armistice, the Imperial Navy's main ships were ordered to be turned over to the Allies but they were instead scuttled by their own crews. All ships of the Imperial Navy bore the prefix SMS, for Seiner Majestät Schiff (His Majesty's Ship).

== Achievements ==
The Imperial Navy achieved some important operational feats. At the Battle of Coronel, it inflicted the first major defeat on the Royal Navy in over one hundred years, although the German squadron of ships was subsequently defeated at the Battle of the Falkland Islands, only one ship escaping destruction. The Navy also emerged from the fleet action of the Battle of Jutland having destroyed more ships than it lost, although the strategic value of both of these encounters was minimal.

The Imperial Navy was the first to operate submarines successfully on a large scale in wartime, with 375 submarines commissioned by the end of the First World War, and it also operated zeppelins. Although it was never able to match the number of ships of the Royal Navy, it had technological advantages, such as better shells and propellant for much of the Great War, meaning that it never lost a ship to a catastrophic magazine explosion from an above-water attack, although the elderly pre-dreadnought SMS Pommern sank rapidly at Jutland after a magazine explosion was caused by an underwater attack.

== 1871 to 1888, Kaiser Wilhelm I ==
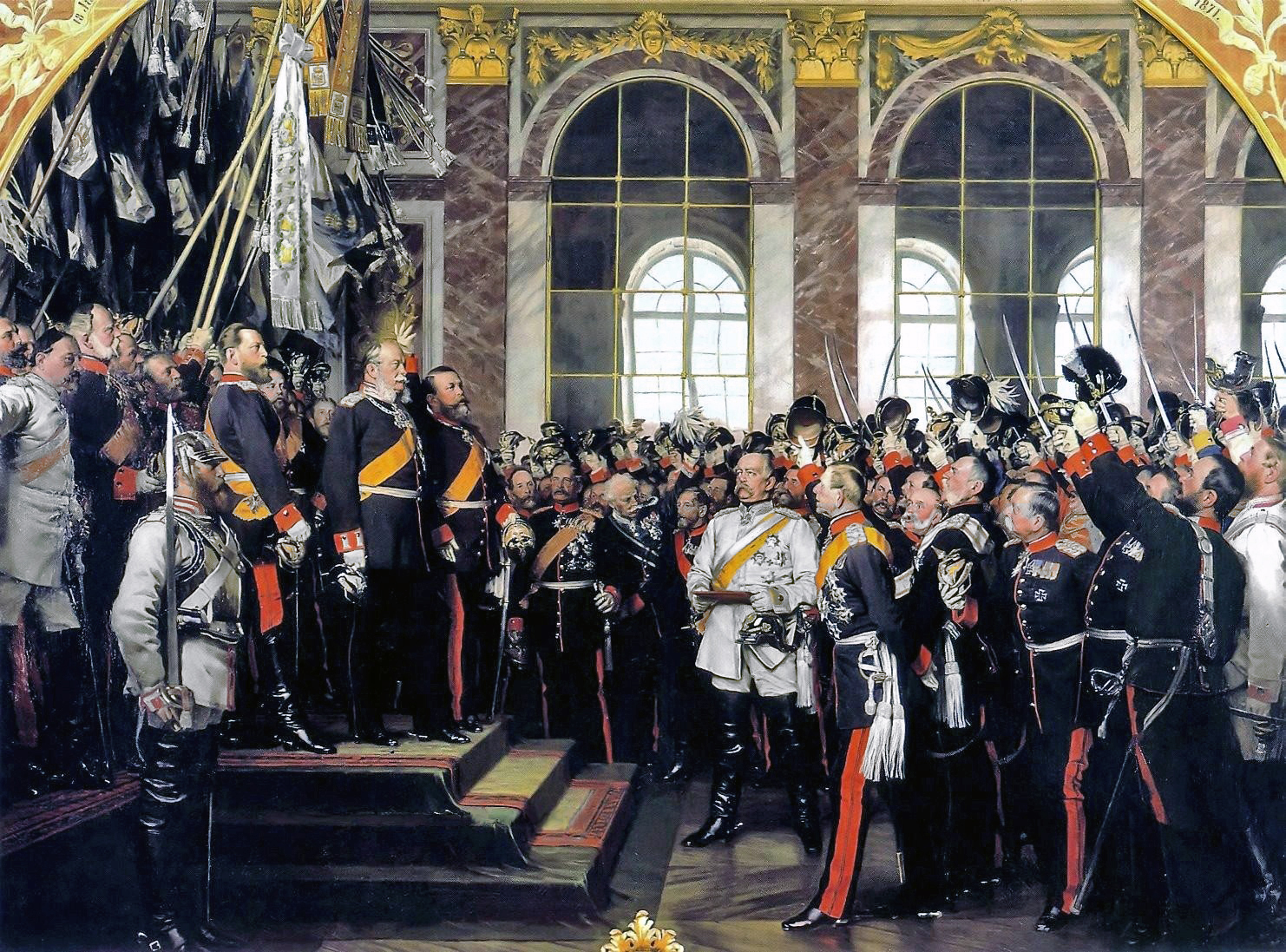
Proclamation of Wilhelm I as Emperor of Germany at Versailles, France in 1871

The unification of Germany under Prussian leadership was the defining point for the creation of the Imperial Navy in 1871. The newly created emperor, Wilhelm I, as King of Prussia, had previously been head of state of the strongest state forming part of the new empire. The navy remained the same as that operated by the empire's predecessor organisation in the unification of Germany, the North German Confederation, which itself in 1867 had inherited the navy of the Kingdom of Prussia. Article 53 of the new Empire's constitution recognised the existence of the Navy as an independent organisation, but until 1888 it was commanded by army officers and initially adopted the same regulations as the Prussian army. Supreme command was vested in the emperor, but its first appointed chief was General der Infanterie (General of the Infantry) Albrecht von Stosch. Kiel on the Baltic Sea and Wilhelmshaven on the North Sea served as the Navy's principal naval bases. The former Navy Ministry became the Imperial Admiralty on 1 February 1872, while Stosch became formally an admiral in 1875. Initially the main task of the new Imperial Navy was coastal protection, with France and Russia seen as Germany's most likely future enemies. The Imperial Navy's tasks were then to prevent any invasion force from landing and to protect coastal towns from possible bombardment.

In March 1872 a German Imperial Naval Academy was created at Kiel for training officers, followed in May by the creation of a 'Machine Engineer Corps', and in February 1873 a 'Medical Corps'. In July 1879 a separate 'Torpedo Engineer Corps' was created dealing with torpedoes and mines. In May 1872 a ten-year building programme was instituted to modernise the fleet. This called for eight armoured frigates, six armoured corvettes, twenty light corvettes, seven monitors, two floating batteries, six avisos, eighteen gunboats and twenty-eight torpedo boats, at an estimated cost of 220 million gold marks. The building plan had to be approved by the Reichstag, which controlled the allocation of funds, although one-quarter of the money came from French war reparations.

In 1883 Stosch was replaced by another general, Count Leo von Caprivi. At this point the navy had seven armoured frigates and four armoured corvettes, 400 officers and 5,000 ratings. The objectives of coastal defence remained largely unchanged, but there was a new emphasis on development of the torpedo, which offered the possibility of relatively small ships successfully attacking much larger ones. In October 1887 the first torpedo division was created at Wilhelmshaven and the second torpedo division based at Kiel. In 1887 Caprivi requested the construction of ten armoured frigates.

Greater importance was placed at this time on development of the army, which was expected to be more important in any war. However, the Kiel Canal was commenced in June 1887, which connected the North Sea with the Baltic through the Jutland peninsula, allowing German ships to travel between the two seas avoiding waters controlled by other countries. This shortened the journey for commercial ships, but specifically united the two areas principally of concern to the German navy, at a cost of 150 million marks. Later, the protection of German maritime trade routes became important. This soon involved the setting up of some overseas supply stations, so-called Auswärtige Stationen (foreign stations), and in the 1880s the Imperial Navy played a part in helping to secure the establishment of German colonies and protectorates in Africa, Asia and Oceania.

== 1888 to 1897, under Kaiser Wilhelm II ==
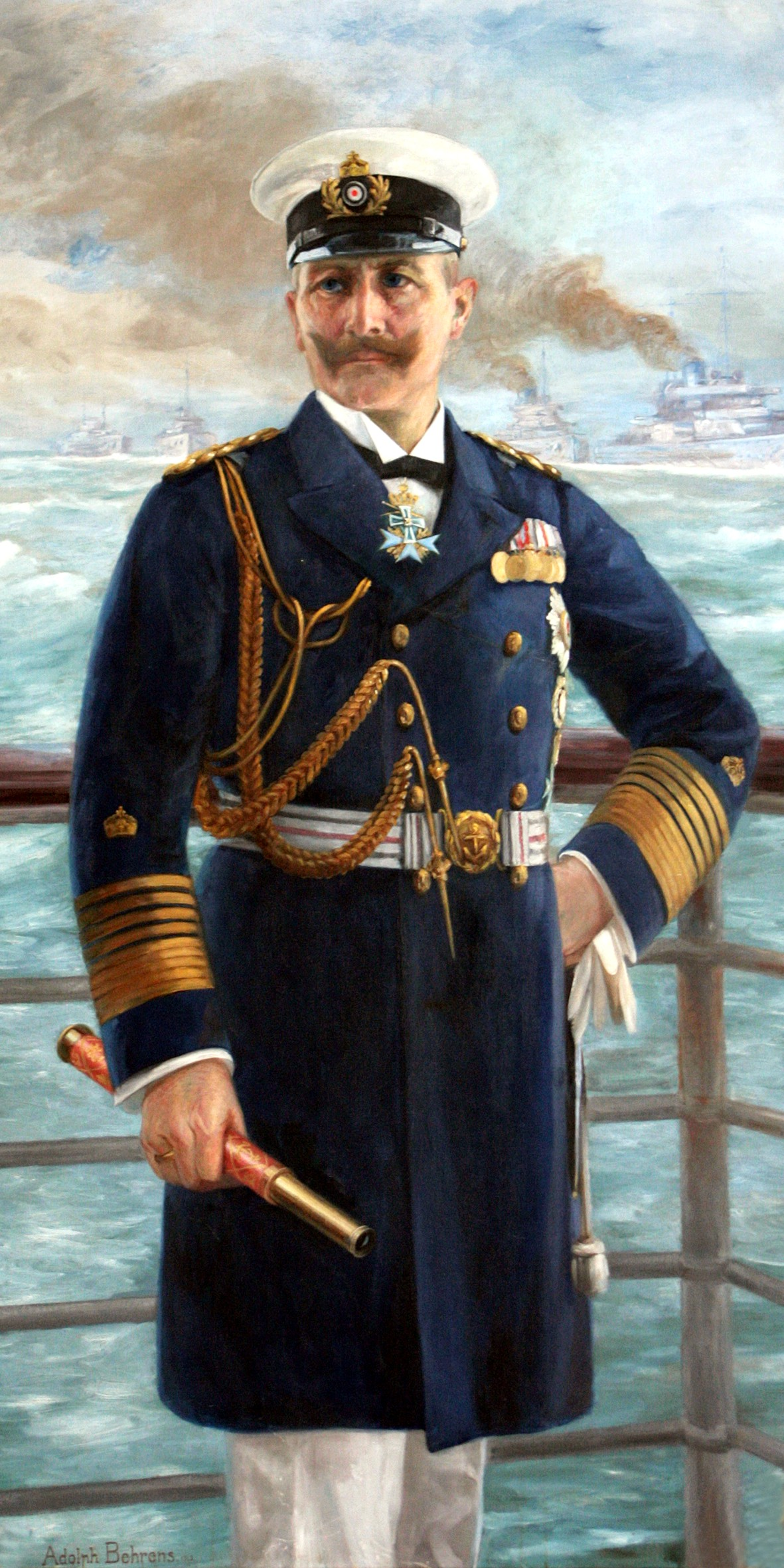
Wilhelm II in German Admiral's uniform in 1913

In June 1888 Wilhelm II became Emperor after the death of his father Frederick III, who ruled for only 99 days. He started his reign with the intention of doing for the navy what his grandfather Wilhelm I had done for the army. The creation of a maritime empire to rival the British and French empires became an ambition to mark Germany as a truly global great power. Wilhelm became Grand Admiral of the German Navy, but also was awarded honorific titles from all over Europe, becoming admiral in the British, Russian, Swedish, Danish, Norwegian, Austro-Hungarian and Greek navies. On one occasion he wore the uniform of a British admiral to receive the visiting British ambassador. At this time the Imperial Navy had 534 officers and 15,480 men.

The concept of expanding naval power, inevitably at the cost of not expanding other forces, was opposed by the three successive heads of the German armed forces, Waldersee, Schlieffen and Moltke between 1888 and 1914. It would also have been more widely opposed, had the Kaiser's intentions been widely known. Instead, he proceeded with a plan to expand the navy slowly, justifying enlargement step by step. In July 1888 Wilhelm II appointed Vice-Admiral Alexander von Monts as head of the admiralty. Monts oversaw the design of the Brandenburg-class battleship, four of which were constructed by 1894 at a cost of 16 million marks each and displacement of 10,000 tons.

In 1889 Wilhelm II reorganised top level control of the navy by creating a Navy Cabinet (Marine-Kabinett) equivalent to the German Imperial Military Cabinet which had previously functioned in the same capacity for both the army and navy. The Head of the navy cabinet was responsible for promotions, appointments, administration and issuing orders to naval forces. Captain Gustav von Senden-Bibran was appointed as its first head and remained so until 1906, when he was replaced by the long-serving Admiral Georg Alexander von Müller. The existing Imperial admiralty was abolished and its responsibilities divided between two organisations. A new position of Chief of the Imperial Naval High Command was created, being responsible for ship deployments, strategy and tactics, an equivalent to the supreme commander of the Army. Vice admiral Max von der Goltz was appointed in 1889 and remained in post until 1895. Construction and maintenance of ships and obtaining supplies was the responsibility of the State Secretary of the Imperial Navy Office (Reichsmarineamt), responsible to the chancellor and advising the Reichstag on naval matters. The first appointee was Rear Admiral Karl Eduard Heusner, followed shortly by Rear Admiral Friedrich von Hollmann from 1890 to 1897. Each of these three heads of department reported separately to Wilhelm II.

In 1895 funding was agreed for five battleships of the Kaiser Friedrich III class, completed by 1902. The ships were innovative for their time, introducing a complex system of watertight compartments and storing coal along the sides of the ship to help absorb explosions. However, the ships went against the trend for increasingly larger main guns, having smaller diameter guns than the Brandenburg design, but with a quick-loading design and more powerful secondary armaments. Costs rose to 21 million marks each, as had size to 11,500 tons.

In 1892 Germany had launched the protected cruiser SMS Kaiserin Augusta, the first navy ship to have triple propellers. She was succeeded by five Victoria Louise-class protected cruisers, the last 'protected', as distinct from 'armoured' cruiser class constructed by Germany. The ships, completed between 1898 and 1900, had deck armour but not side armour and were intended for overseas duties. Shortages of funding meant it was not possible to create several designs of cruisers specialised for long range work, or more heavily armoured for fleet work. Work commenced on an armoured cruiser design, SMS Fürst Bismarck started in 1896 and commissioned in 1900.

== 1897 to 1906, Tirpitz and the Navy bills ==
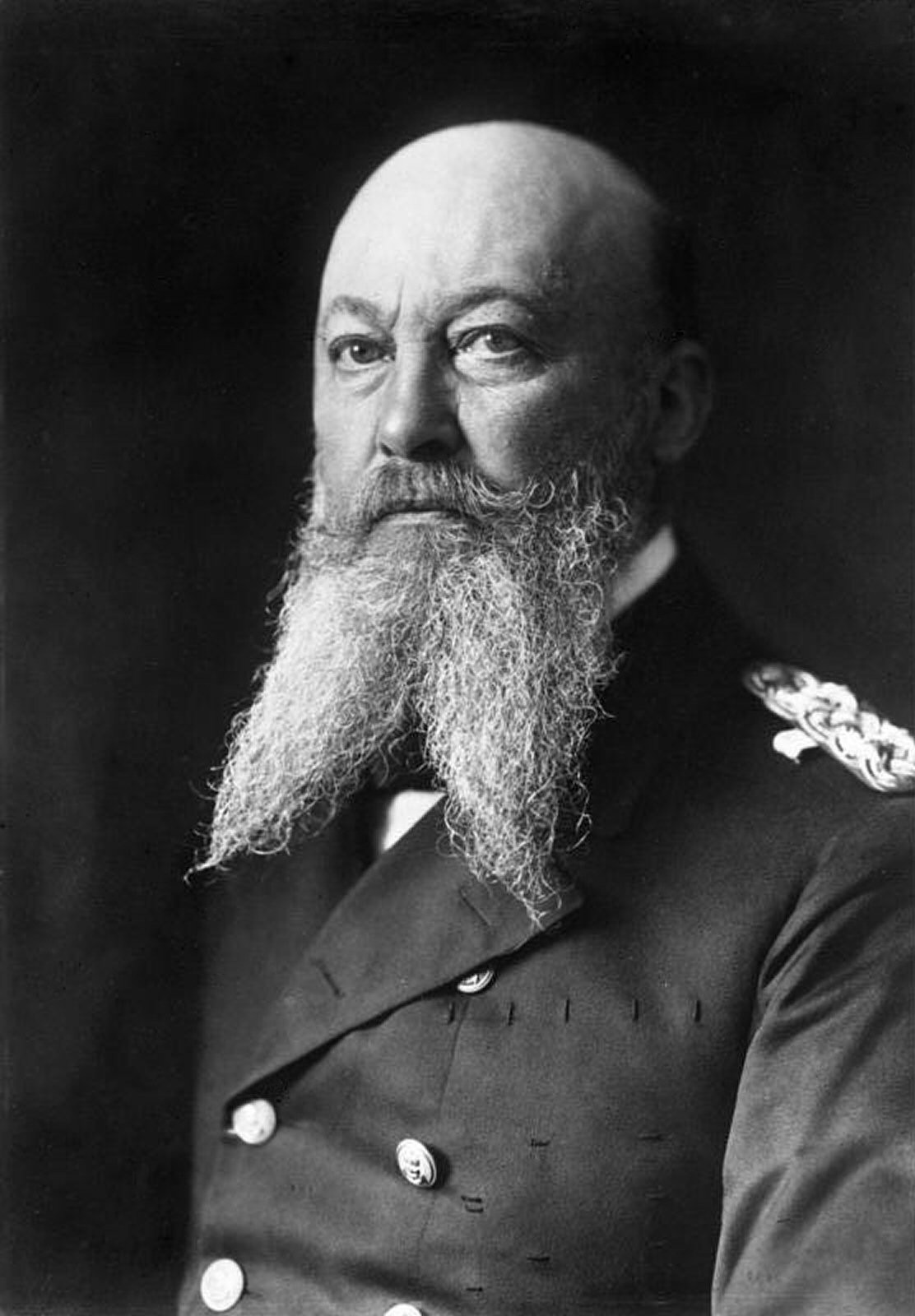
Alfred von Tirpitz

On 18 June 1897 Rear-Admiral Alfred von Tirpitz was appointed State Secretary of the Navy, where he remained for nineteen years. Tirpitz advocated the cause of an expanded navy necessary for Germany to defend her territories abroad. He had great success in persuading parliament to pass successive Navy bills authorising expansions of the fleet. German foreign policy as espoused by Otto von Bismarck had been to deflect the interest of great powers abroad while Germany consolidated her integration and military strength. Now Germany was to compete with the rest. Tirpitz started with a publicity campaign aimed at popularising the navy. He created popular magazines about the navy, arranged for Alfred Thayer Mahan's The Influence of Sea Power upon History, which argued the importance of naval forces, to be translated into German and serialised in newspapers, arranged rallies in support and invited politicians and industrialists to naval reviews. Various pressure groups were formed to lobby politicians and spread publicity. One such organisation, the navy league or Flottenverein, was organized by principals in the steel industry (Alfred Krupp), ship yards and banks, gaining more than one million members. Political parties were offered concessions, such as taxes on imported grain, in exchange for their support for naval bills.

On 10 April 1898 the first Navy Bill was passed by the Reichstag. It authorised the maintenance of a fleet of 19 battleships, 8 armoured cruisers, 12 large cruisers and 30 light cruisers to be constructed by 1 April 1904. Existing ships were counted in the total, but the bill provided for ships to be replaced every 25 years on an indefinite basis. Five million marks annually was allocated to run the navy, with a total budget of 408 million marks for shipbuilding. This would bring the German fleet to a strength where it could contemplate challenging France or Russia, but would remain clearly inferior to the world's largest fleet, the Royal Navy.

Following the Boxer Rebellion in China and the Boer War, a second navy bill was passed on 14 June 1900. This approximately doubled the allocated number of ships to 38 battleships, 20 armoured cruisers, 38 light cruisers. Significantly, the bill set no overall cost limit for the building program. Expenditure for the navy was too great to be met from taxation: the Reichstag had limited powers to extend taxation without entering into negotiations with the constituent German states, and this was considered politically unviable. Instead, the bill was financed by massive loans. Tirpitz, in 1899 was already exploring the possibilities for extending the battleship total to 45, a target which rose to 48 by 1909.

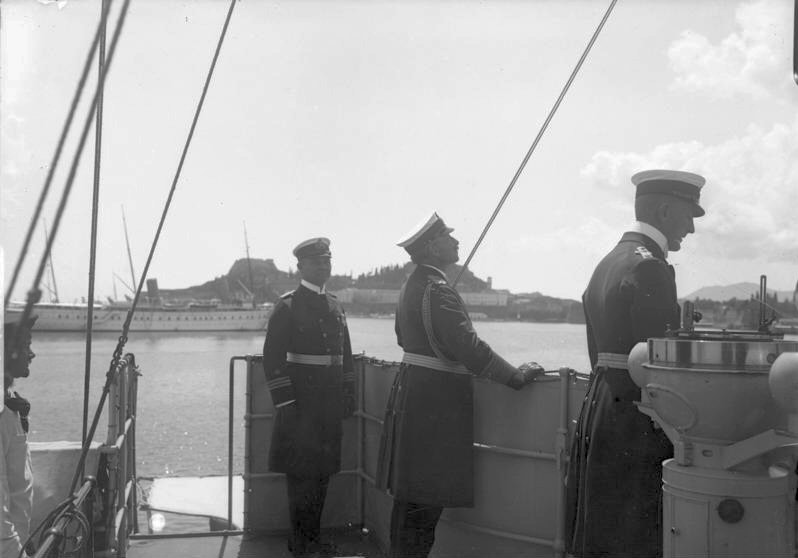
Kaiser Wilhelm II on board the light cruiser SMS Geier in 1894

Tirpitz's ultimate goal was a fleet capable of rivaling the Royal Navy. As British public opinion was turned against Germany, Admiral Sir John Fisher twice – in 1904 and 1908 – proposed using Britain's current naval superiority to 'Copenhagen' the German fleet, that is, to launch pre-emptive strikes against the Kiel and Wilhelmshaven naval bases as the Royal Navy had done against the Danish navy in 1801 and 1807." Tirpitz argued that if the fleet could achieve two-thirds the number of capital ships possessed by Britain then it stood a chance of winning in a conflict. Britain had to maintain a fleet throughout the world and consider other naval powers, whereas the German fleet could be concentrated in German waters. Attempts were made to play down the perceived threat to Britain, but once the German fleet reached the position of equalling the other second-rank navies, it became impossible to avoid mention of the one great fleet it was intended to challenge. Tirpitz hoped that other second-rank powers might ally with Germany, attracted by its navy. The policy of commencing what amounted to a naval arms race did not properly consider how Britain might respond. British policy, stated in the Naval Defence Act of 1889, was to maintain a navy superior to Britain's two largest rivals combined. The British Admiralty estimated that the German navy would be the world's second largest by 1906.

Major reforms of the Royal Navy were undertaken, particularly by Fisher as First Sea Lord from 1904 to 1909. 154 older ships, including 17 battleships, were scrapped to make way for newer vessels. Reforms in training and gunnery were introduced to make good perceived deficiencies, which in part Tirpitz had counted upon to provide his ships with a margin of superiority. More capital ships were stationed in British home waters. A treaty with Japan in 1902 meant that ships could be withdrawn from East Asia, while the Entente Cordiale with France in 1904 meant that Britain could concentrate on guarding Channel waters, including the French coast, while France would protect British interests in the Mediterranean. By 1906 it was considered that Britain's only likely naval enemy was Germany.

The German High Seas Fleet, with a member of the Braunschweig class in the lead, observed from above by an Imperial Navy Zeppelin conducting aerial reconnaissance

Five battleships of the Wittelsbach class were constructed from 1899 to 1904 at a cost of 22 million marks per ship. Five ships of the Braunschweig class were built between 1901 and 1906 for the slightly greater 24 million marks each. Technological improvements meant that rapid fire guns could be made larger, so the Braunschweig class had a main armament of 28 cm (11 in) guns. Due to torpedo improvements in range and accuracy, emphasis was placed on a secondary armament of smaller guns to defend against them. The five Deutschland-class battleships constructed between 1903 and 1908 had similar armament as the Braunschweig class, but heavier armour, for the slightly greater sum of 24.5 million marks each.

Development of armoured cruisers also continued. Fürst Bismarck's design was improved upon in the subsequent Prinz Heinrich, completed in 1902. Two ships of the Prinz Adalbert class were commissioned in 1904, followed by two similar Roon-class armoured cruisers commissioned in 1905 and 1906, at costs around 17 million marks each. SMS Scharnhorst and SMS Gneisenau followed, between 1904 and 1908, and cost an estimated for 20.3 million marks. Main armament was eight 21 cm (8.3 in) guns, but with six 15 cm (5.9 in) and eighteen 8.8 cm (3.5 in) guns for smaller targets. Eight Bremen-class light cruisers were constructed between 1902 and 1907, developed from the earlier Gazelle class. The ships had ten 10.5 centimetres (4.1 in) guns and were named after German towns. SMS Lübeck was the first German cruiser to be fitted with turbine engines, which were also trialled in torpedo boat S-125. Turbines were faster, quieter, lighter, more reliable and more fuel efficient at high speeds. The first British experimental design (the destroyer HMS Velox) had been constructed in 1901 and as a result Tirpitz had set up a special commission to develop turbines. No reliable German design was available by 1903, so British Parsons turbines were purchased.

=== Command reorganisation ===
In 1899, the Imperial Naval High Command was replaced by the German Imperial Admiralty Staff (Admiralstab) responsible for planning, the training of officers, and naval intelligence. In time of war it was to assume overall command, but in peace acted only advisory. Direct control of various elements of the fleet was subordinated to officers commanding those elements, accountable to the Kaiser. The reorganisations suited the Kaiser who wanted to maintain direct control of his ships. A disadvantage was that it split apart the integrated military command structure which before had balanced the importance of the navy within overall defence considerations. It suited Alfred von Tirpitz, because it removed the influence of the admiralty staff from naval planning, but left him the possibility, in wartime, to reorganise command around himself. Wilhelm II, however, never agreed to relinquish direct control of his fleet.

== 1906 to 1908, the Dreadnought and innovation: First Novelle ==
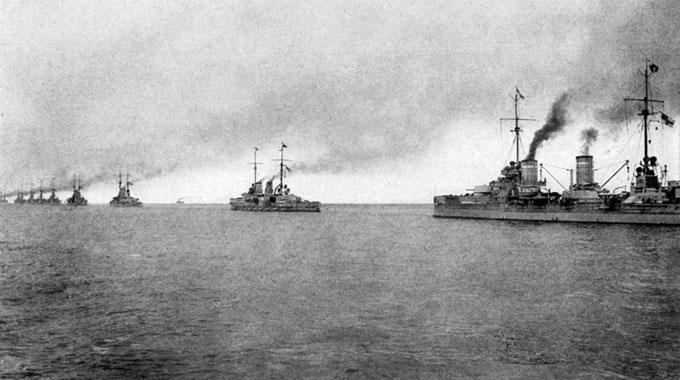
Dreadnoughts of the High Seas Fleet

On 3 December 1906 the Royal Navy received a new battleship, HMS Dreadnought. She became famous as the first of a new concept in battleship design, using all big gun, single size of calibre armament. She used turbine propulsion for greater speed and less space required by the machinery, and guns arranged so that three times as many could be brought to bear when firing ahead, and twice as many when firing broadside. The design was not a uniquely British concept as similar ships were being built around the world, nor was it uniquely intended as a counter to German naval expansion, but the effect was to immediately require Germany to reconsider its naval building program. The battleship design was complemented by the introduction of a variant with lighter armour and greater speed, which became the battlecruiser.

The revolution in design, together with improvements in personnel and training severely brought into question the German assumption that a fleet of two-thirds the size of the Royal Navy would at least stand a chance in an engagement. By 1906 Germany was already spending 60% of revenue upon the army. Either an enormous sum now had to be found to develop the navy further, or naval expansion had to be abandoned. The decision to continue was taken by Tirpitz in September 1905 and agreed by Chancellor Bernhard von Bülow and the Kaiser, while Dreadnought was still at the planning stage. The larger ships would naturally be more expensive, but also would require enlargement of harbours, locks and the Kiel canal, all of which would be enormously expensive. Estimated cost for new dreadnoughts was placed at 36.5 million marks for 19,000 tons displacement ships (larger than Dreadnought at 17,900 tons), and 27.5 million marks for battle-cruisers. 60 million mark was allocated for dredging the canal. The Reichstag was persuaded to agree to the program and passed a Novelle (a supplementary law) amending the navy bills and allocating 940 million marks for a dreadnought program and the necessary infrastructure. Two dreadnoughts and one battlecruiser were to be built each year.

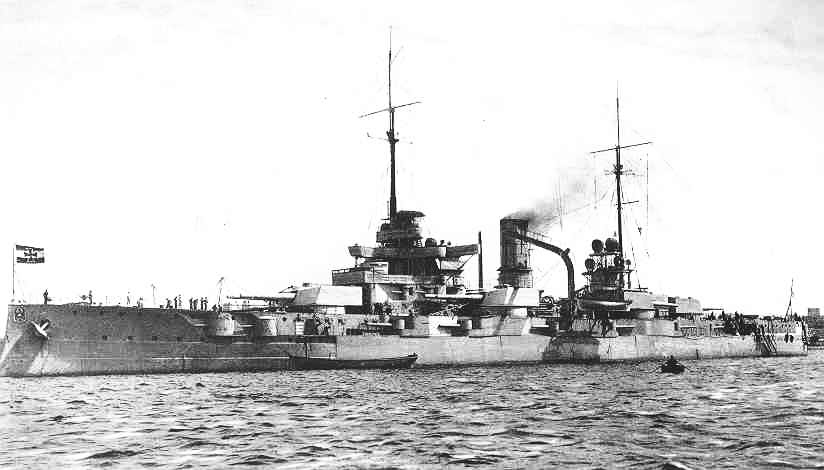
Nassau class battleship: the wing (side) turrets could not fire cross-deck (across the ship).

Construction of four Nassau-class battleships began in 1907 under the greatest possible secrecy. The chief German naval designer was Hans Bürkner. A principle was introduced that the thickness of side armour on a ship would equal the calibre of the large guns, while ships were increasingly divided internally into watertight compartments to make them more resistant to flooding when damaged. The design was hampered by the necessity to use reciprocating engines instead of the smaller turbines, since no sufficiently powerful design was available and acceptable to the German navy. Turrets could not be placed above the centre of the ship and instead had to be placed at the side, meaning two of the six turrets would always be on the wrong side of the ship when firing broadsides. Main armament was twelve 28 cm guns. The ships were all completed by 1910, over budget, averaging 37.4 million marks each. In 1910 they were transferred from Kiel to Wilhelmshaven, where two new large docks had been completed and more were under construction.

The first German battlecruiser—SMS Von der Tann—was commenced March 1908. Four Parsons turbines were used, improving speed to 27 knots and reducing weight. Four twin turrets mounted 28 cm guns; although the two centre turrets were still placed one either side of the ship, they were offset so could now fire either side. The design was considered a success, but the cost at 35.5 million marks was significantly above the 1906 allocation. Light cruiser development continued with the Dresden-class light cruisers, which were to become famous for their actions in the start of World War I in the Pacific. The ships were 3,300 tons, and armed with ten 10.5 cm rapid fire guns and a speed around 24 knots. SMS Dresden cost 7.5 million marks, and SMS Emden 6 million marks. Four Kolberg-class cruiser were produced between 1907 and 1911 at 4,400 tons and around 8 million marks each. These had turbines, twelve 10.5 cm guns as main armament, but were also equipped to carry and lay 100 mines. From 1907 onward, all torpedo boats were constructed using turbine engines.

Despite their ultimate importance, the German navy declined to take up the cause of another experiment, the submarine, until 1904. The first submarine, U-1 was delivered in December 1906, built by Krupp's Germania yard in Kiel. The first submarine had 238 ton displacement on the surface and 283 tons submerged. The kerosene engine developed 10 knots on the surface with a range of 1,500 nautical miles (2,800 km; 1,700 mi). Submerged, the ship could manage 50 nautical miles at 5 knots using battery electric propulsion. The ships followed a design by Maxime Laubeuf first used successfully in 1897, having a double hull and flotation tanks around the outside of the main crew compartments. The submarine had just one torpedo tube at the front and a total of three torpedoes. The early engines were noisy and smoky, so that a considerable boost to the usefulness of the submarine came with the introduction of quieter and cleaner diesel engines in 1910, which were much more difficult for an enemy to detect.

== 1908 to 1912, Second Novelle ==
German expenditure on ships was steadily rising. In 1907, 290 million marks was spent on the fleet, rising to 347 million marks or 24 percent of the national budget in 1908, with a predicted budget deficit of 500 million marks. By the outbreak of World War I, one billion marks had been added to Germany's national debt because of naval expenditures. While each German ship was more expensive than the last, the British managed to reduce the cost of the succeeding generations of Bellerophon (3 ships) and St. Vincent (3) battleships. Successive British battlecruisers were more expensive, but less so than their German equivalents. Overall, German ships were some 30% more expensive than the British. This all contributed to growing opposition in the Reichstag to any further expansion, particularly when it was clear that Britain intended to match and exceed any German expansion program. In the fleet itself, complaints were beginning to be made in 1908 about underfunding and shortages of crews for the new ships. The State Secretary of the Treasury, Hermann von Stengel, resigned because he could see no way to resolve the budget deficit.

The elections of 1907 had returned a Reichstag more favourable to military exploits, following the refusal of the previous parliament to grant funds to suppress uprisings in colonies in German South-West Africa. Despite the difficulties, Tirpitz persuaded the Reichstag to pass a further Novelle in March 1908. This reduced the service life for ships from 25 years to 20 years, allowing for faster modernisation, and increased the building rate to four capital ships per year. Tirpitz's target was a fleet of 16 battleships and 5 battlecruisers by 1914, and 38 battleships and 20 battlecruisers by 1920. There were also to be 38 light cruisers, and 144 torpedo boats. The bill contained a restriction, that building would fall to two ships per year in 1912, but Tirpitz was confident of changing this at a later date. He anticipated that German industry, now heavily involved in shipbuilding, would back a campaign to maintain a higher construction rate.

Four battleships of the Helgoland class were laid down in 1909–10, with displacements of 22,800 tons, twelve 30.5 cm (12.0 in) guns in 6 turrets, reciprocating engines generating a maximum speed of 21 knots, and a price tag of 46 million marks. Again, the turret configuration was dictated by the need to use the centre of the ship for machinery, despite the disadvantage of the turret layout. The ships were now equipped with 50 cm (20 in) torpedoes.

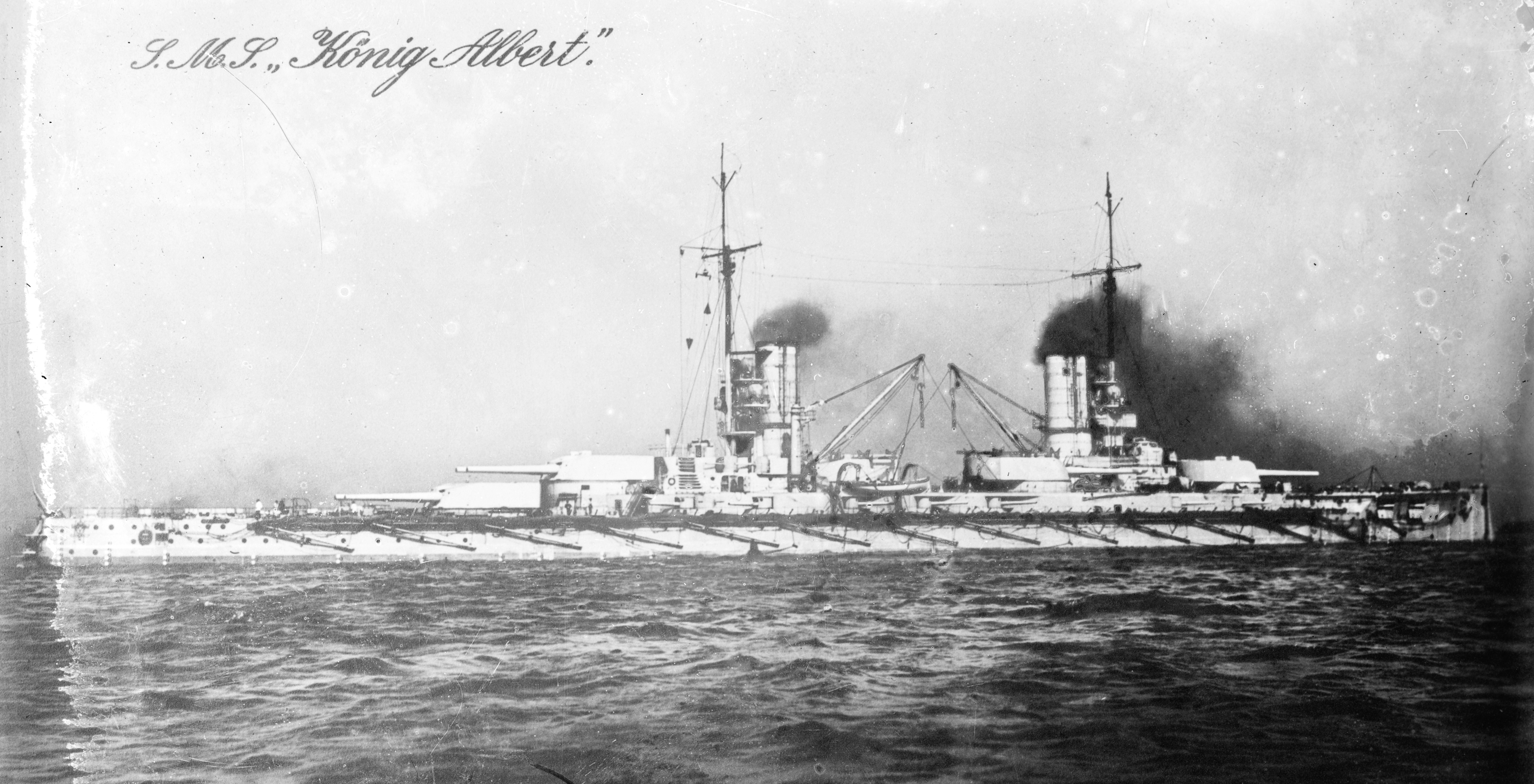
Kaiser-class battleship: introduced superfiring aft turrets, tandem wing turrets (side turrets offset to allow cross-deck firing) and turbine propulsion.

The Kaiser-class battleships built between 1909 and 1913 introduced a change in design as turbine engines were finally approved. The ships had ten 30.5 cm guns, losing two of the centre side turrets but gaining an additional turret astern on the centre line. As with the Von der Tann design, which was drawn up at a similar time, all guns could be fired either side in broadsides, meaning more guns could come to bear than with the Helgoland design, despite having fewer in total. Five ships were constructed rather than the usual four, one to act as a fleet flagship. One ship, the SMS Prinzregent Luitpold, was equipped with only two turbines rather than three, with the intention of having an additional diesel engine for cruising, but the Howaldt engine could not be developed in time. Luitpold had a top speed of 20 knots as a result, compared to 22 knots for the other ships. The ships were larger than the preceding class at 24,700 tons, but cheaper at 45 million marks. They formed part of the third squadron of the High Seas Fleet as it was constituted for World War I.

Between 1908 and 1912 two Moltke-class battlecruisers were constructed, adding an extra turret on the centre line astern, raised above the aft turret, but still using 28 cm guns. SMS Moltke became part of the High Seas Fleet, but SMS Goeben became part of the Mediterranean squadron and spent World War I as part of the Ottoman navy. The ships cost 42.6 and 41.6 million marks, with maximum speed of 28 knots. Seydlitz was constructed as a slightly enlarged version of the Moltke design, reaching a maximum speed of 29 knots. All cruisers were equipped with turbine engines from 1908 onwards. Between 1910 and 1912 four Magdeburg-class light cruisers were constructed of 4,600 tons, at around 7.4 million marks each. The ships were fitted with oil burners to improve the effectiveness of their main coal fueling. These were followed by the similar but slightly enlarged and marginally faster Karlsruhe and Graudenz-class light cruisers.

In 1907 a naval artillery school was established at Sonderburg (north of Kiel). This aimed to address the difficulties with the new generation of guns, which with potentially greater range required aiming devices capable of directing them at targets at those extreme ranges. By 1914, experiments were being conducted with guns in increasing sizes up to 51 cm (20 in). Capital ships were fitted with spotting tops high up on masts with range finding equipment, while ship design was altered to place turrets on the centre line of the ship for improved accuracy.

The four König-class battleships were commenced between October 1911 and May 1912 and entered service in 1914 at a cost of 45 million marks, forming the other part of the Third Squadron of the High Seas Fleet. They were 28,500 tons, with a maximum speed of 21 knots from three triple-stage Brown-Boverie-Parsons turbines. Main armament was five double turrets housing twin 30.5 cm guns, arranged with two turrets fore and aft and one in the centre of the ship. The second turret at either end was raised higher than the outer so that it could fire over the top (superfiring). As with Prinzregent Luitpold, the ships were originally intended to have one diesel engine for cruising, but these were never developed and turbines were fitted instead. The ships were equipped with torpedo nets, trailed along the hull intended to stop torpedoes, but these reduced maximum speed to an impractical 8 knots and were later removed.

Construction began in 1910 of the first submarine powered by twin diesel engines. U-19 was twice the size of the first German submarine, had five times the range at 7,600 nautical miles (14,100 km; 8,700 mi) cruising at 8 knots, or 15 knots maximum. There were now two bow and two stern torpedo tubes, with six torpedoes carried. The ships were designed to operate at a depth of 50 metres (160 ft), though could go to 80 metres (260 ft).

== 1912 to 1914, Third Novelle ==
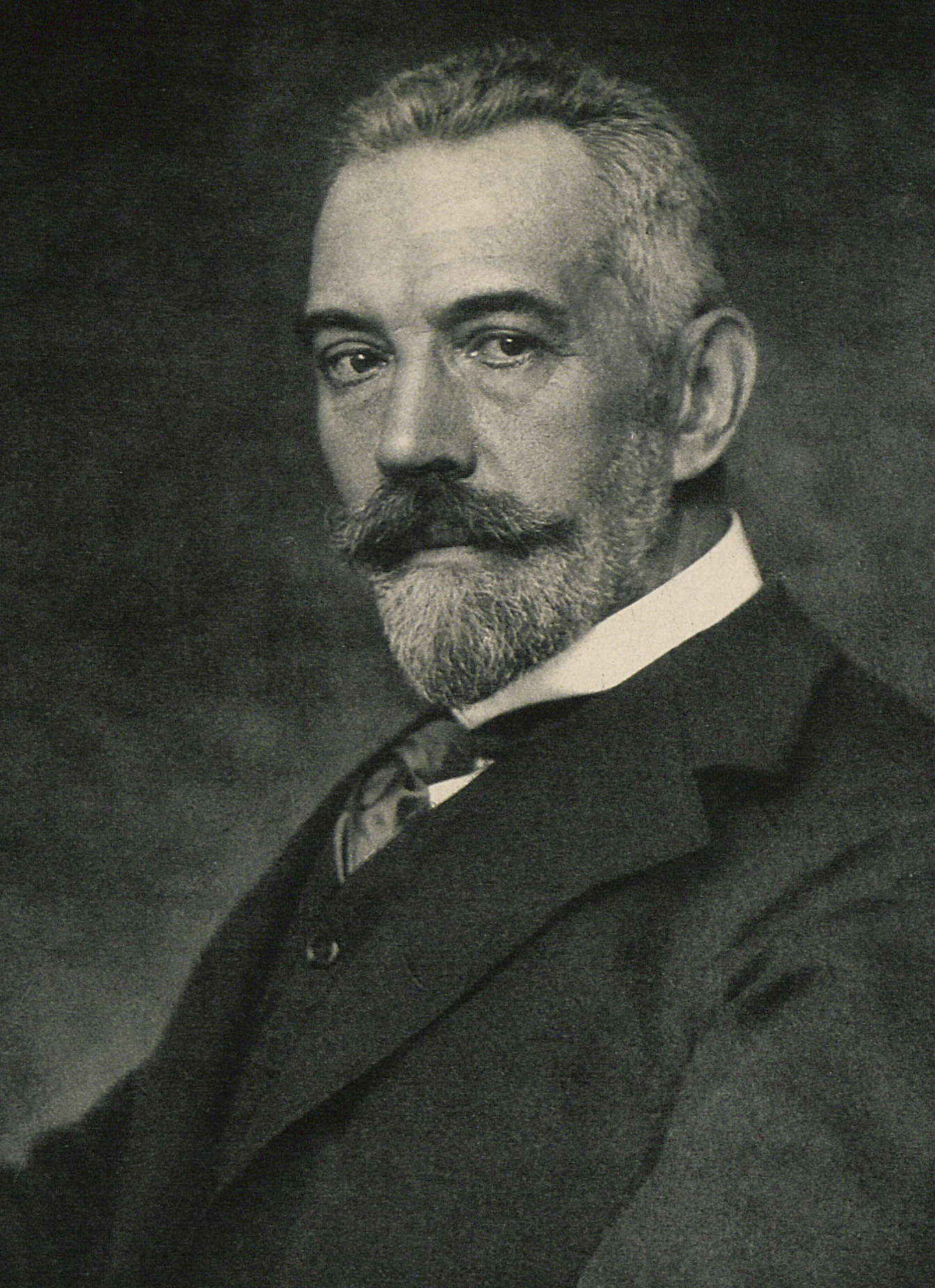
Chancellor Bethmann Hollweg argued for a guaranteed proportion of military expenditure for the army.

Spending on the navy increased inexorably year by year. In 1909, Chancellor Bernhard von Bülow and Treasury Secretary Reinhold von Sydow attempted to pass a new budget boosting taxes in an attempt to reduce the deficit. The Social Democratic parties refused to accept the increased taxes on goods, while the conservatives opposed increases in inheritance taxes. Bülow and Sydow resigned in defeat and Theobald von Bethmann Hollweg became Chancellor. His attempted solution was to initiate negotiations with Britain for an agreed slow down in naval building. Negotiations came to nothing when in 1911 the Agadir Crisis brought France and Germany into conflict. Germany attempted to 'persuade' France to cede territory in the Middle Congo in return for giving France a free hand in Morocco. The effect was to raise concerns in Britain over Germany's expansionist aims, and encouraged Britain to form a closer relationship with France, including naval cooperation. Tirpitz saw this once again as an opportunity to press for naval expansion and the continuation of the four capital ships per year building rate into 1912. The January 1912 elections brought a Reichstag where the Social Democrats, opposed to military expansion, became the largest party.

The German army, mindful of the steadily increasing proportion of spending going to the navy, demanded an increase of 136,000 men to bring its size closer to that of France. In February 1912 the British war minister, Viscount Haldane, came to Berlin to discuss possible limits to naval expansion. Meanwhile, in Britain, the First Lord of the Admiralty Winston Churchill made a speech describing the German navy as a 'luxury', which was considered an insult when reported in Germany. The talks came to nothing, ending in recriminations over who had offered what. Bethmann Hollweg argued for a guaranteed proportion of expenditure for the army, but failed when army officers refused to support him publicly. Tirpitz argued for six new capital ships, and got three, together with 15,000 additional sailors in a new combined military budget passed in April 1912. The new ships, together with the existing reserve flagship and four reserve battleships were to become one new squadron for the High Seas Fleet. In all the fleet would have five squadrons of eight battleships, twelve large cruisers and thirty small, plus additional cruisers for overseas duties. Tirpitz intended that with the rolling program of replacements, the existing coastal defence squadron of old ships would become a sixth fleet squadron, while the eight existing battle-cruisers would be joined by eight more as replacements for the large cruisers presently in the overseas squadrons. The plan envisaged a main fleet of 100,000 men, 49 battleships and 28 battlecruisers by 1920. The Kaiser commented of the British, "... we have them up against the wall."

Although Tirpitz had succeeded in getting more ships, the proportion of military expenditure on the navy declined in 1912 and thereafter, from 35% in 1911 to 33% in 1912 and 25% in 1913. This reflected a change in attitude amongst military planners that a land war in Europe was increasingly likely, and a turning away from Tirpitz's scheme for worldwide expansion using the navy. In 1912 General von Moltke commented, "I consider war to be unavoidable, and the sooner the better." The Kaiser's younger brother, Admiral Prince Heinrich of Prussia, considered that the cost of the navy was now too great. In Britain, Churchill announced an intention to build two capital ships for every one constructed by Germany, and reorganised the fleet to move battleships from the Mediterranean to Channel waters. A policy was introduced of promoting British naval officers by merit and ability rather than time served, which saw rapid promotions for Jellicoe and Beatty, both of whom had important roles in the forthcoming World War I. By 1913 the French and British had plans in place for joint naval action against Germany, and France moved its Atlantic fleet from Brest to Toulon, replacing British ships.

Britain also escalated the arms race by expanding the capabilities of its new battleships. The five 1912 Queen Elizabeth class of 32,000 tons would have 15 in (380 mm) guns and would be completely oil-fuelled, allowing a speed of 25 knots. For 1912–13 Germany concentrated on battlecruisers, with three Derfflinger-class ships of 27,000 tons and 26–27 knots maximum speed, costing 56–59 million marks each. These had four turrets mounting two 30.5 cm guns arranged in two turrets either end, with the inner turret superfiring over the outer. SMS Derfflinger was the first German ship to have anti-aircraft guns fitted.

In 1913, Germany responded to the British challenge by laying down two Bayern class battleships. These did not enter service until after the Battle of Jutland, so failed to take part in any major naval action of the war. They had displacement of 28,600 tons, a crew of 1,100 and a speed of 22 knots, costing 50 million marks. Guns were arranged in the same pattern as the preceding battle-cruisers, but were now increased to 38 cm (15 in) diameter. The ships had four 8.8 cm anti-aircraft and also sixteen 15 cm lighter guns, but were coal fuelled. It was considered that coal bunkers at the sides of the ship added to protection against penetrating shells, and Germany also did not have a reliable supply of fuel oil. Two more ships of the class were later laid down, but never completed.

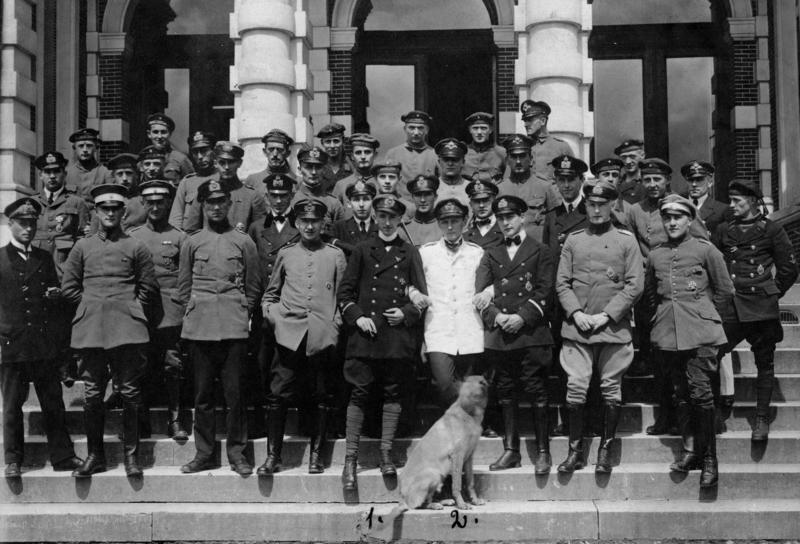
German naval officers, September 1918

Three light cruisers commenced construction in German yards in 1912–1913 ordered by the Russian Navy, costing around 9 million marks. The ships were seized at the outbreak of World War I becoming SMS Regensburg, SMS Pillau and SMS Elbing. Two larger cruisers, SMS Wiesbaden and SMS Frankfurt were also commenced and entered service in 1915. More torpedo boats were constructed, with gradually increasing sizes having reached 800 tons for the V-25 to V-30 craft constructed by AG Vulcan in Kiel before 1914. In 1912 Germany created a Mediterranean squadron consisting of the battlecruiser Goeben and light cruiser Breslau.

=== Air power ===
Naval trials of balloons began in 1891, but the results were unsatisfactory and none were purchased by the navy. In 1895 Count Ferdinand von Zeppelin attempted to interest both the army and navy in his new rigid airships, but without success. The Zeppelin rigids were considered too slow and there were concerns with their reliability operating over water. In 1909 the navy rejected proposals for aircraft to be launched from ships, and again in 1910 declined Zeppelin's airships. Finally in 1911, trials with aircraft began and in 1912 Tirpitz agreed to purchase the first airship for naval reconnaissance at a cost of 850,000 marks.

The machine had insufficient range (1,440 km (890 mi)) to operate over Britain, but had machine guns for use against aircraft and experimental 80 kg (180 lb) bombs. The following year ten more were ordered and a new naval air division was created at Johannisthal, near Berlin. However, in September 1913 L 1 was destroyed in a storm, while the following month L 2 was lost in a gas explosion. Orders for the undelivered machines were cancelled, leaving the navy with one machine, the L 3.

In 1910 Prince Heinrich had learned to fly and supported the cause of naval aviation. In 1911 experiments took place with Albatros seaplanes and in 1912 Tirpitz authorized 200,000 marks for seaplane trials. The Curtiss seaplane was adopted. By 1913 there were four aeroplanes, now including a British Sopwith, and long-term plans to create six naval air stations by 1918. By 1914, the Marine-Fliegerabteilung, the naval counterpart to the well-established Fliegertruppe land-based aviation units of the Army, comprised twelve seaplanes and one landplane and disposed of a budget of 8.5 million marks. Trials in 1914 using seaplanes operating with the fleet were less than impressive; out of four taking part one crashed, one was unable to take off and only one succeeded in all tasks. The most successful aircraft had been the British design, and indeed experiments in Britain had been proceeding with the support of Winston Churchill, and included converting ferries and liners into seaplane carriers.

== World War I ==
By the start of the First World War, the German Imperial Navy possessed 22 pre-Dreadnoughts, (Note: SMS Kurfürst Friedrich Wilhelm and SMS Weissenburg, of the Brandenburg class, had been sold to the Ottoman Empire in 1910.) 14 dreadnought battleships and 4 battle-cruisers. A further three ships of the König class were completed between August and November 1914, and two Bayern-class battleships entered service in 1916. The battlecruisers Derfflinger, Lützow, and Hindenburg were completed in September 1914, March 1916, and May 1917, respectively. All but the latest pre-Dreadnoughts were soon decommissioned, so that their crews could be transferred to more useful vessels. The main fighting forces of the navy were to become the High Seas Fleet and the U-boat fleet. Smaller fleets were deployed to the German overseas protectorates, the most prominent being assigned to the East Asia Squadron at Qingdao. The German Navy's U-boats were also instrumental in the sinking of the passenger liner and auxiliary cruiser, the RMS Lusitania on 7 May 1915, which was one of the main events that led to the USA joining the war two years later in 1917.

=== Engagements ===
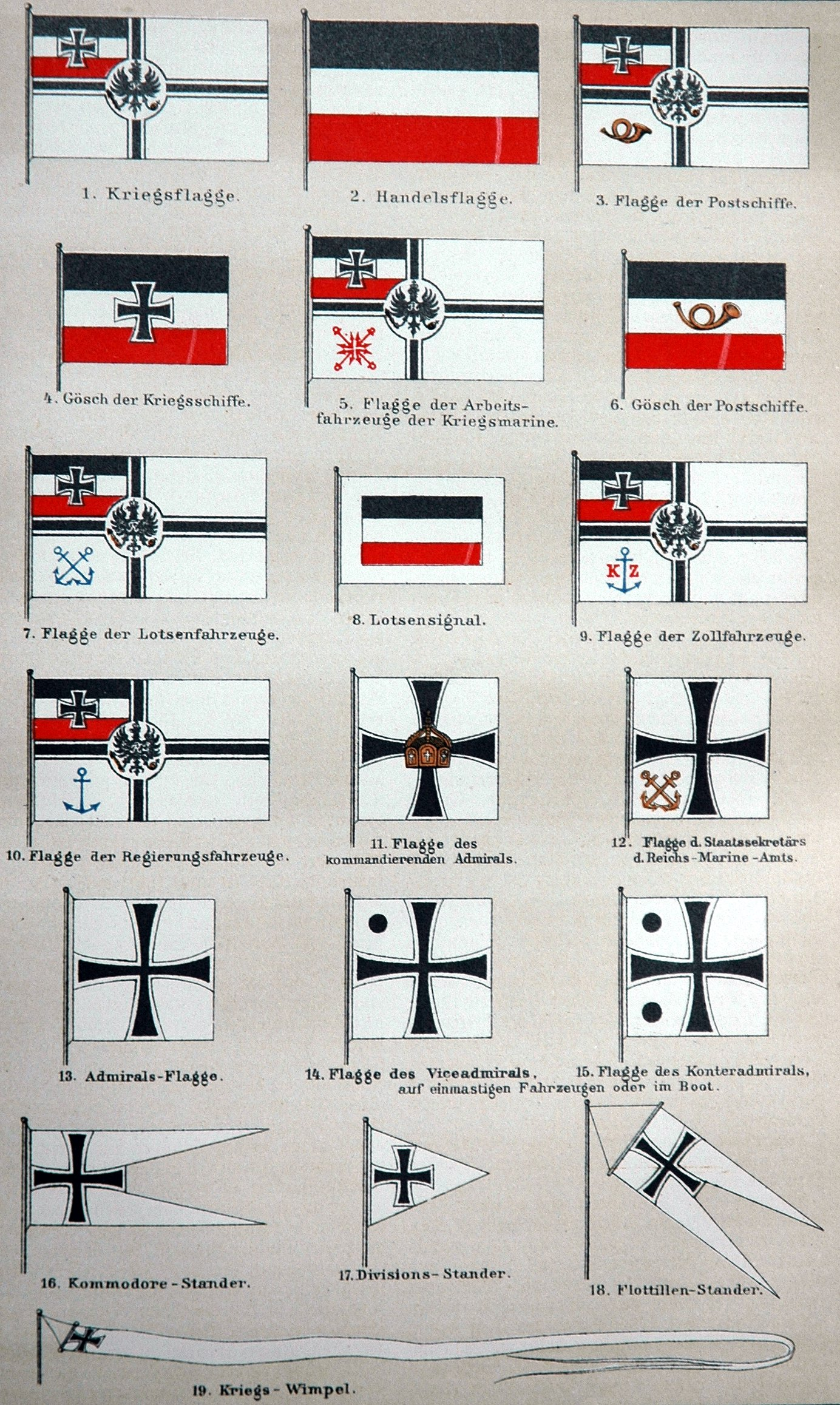
Flags used by the Imperial German Navy

Notable battles fought by the Navy were:

- Battle of Heligoland Bight (Rear Admiral Leberecht Maass) – 1914
- Battle of Coronel (Vice Admiral Maximilian von Spee) – 1914. The East Asia Squadron defeated the British West Indies Squadron
- Battle of the Falkland Islands (Vice Admiral Maximilian von Spee) – 1914. The East Asia Squadron was defeated by British battlecruisers
- Battle of Dogger Bank (Vice Admiral Franz Hipper) – 1915. Armoured cruiser Blücher sank and British battlecruiser Lion put out of action.
- Battle of the Gulf of Riga (Vice Admiral Ehrhard Schmidt)
- Battle of Jutland (Vice Admiral Reinhard Scheer; Vice Admiral Franz Hipper) – 1916. In the largest naval battle of the war several British ships were sunk or damaged but the High Seas Fleet was unable to damage the British Grand Fleet sufficiently to threaten the blockade of Germany.
- Operation Albion, including Battle of Moon Sound (Vice Admiral Ehrhard Schmidt) – 1917. In the Baltic against Russian forces.
- First Battle of the Atlantic – U-boat warfare

Notable minor battles:

- Battle of Gotland
- First Battle of Dover Strait – 1916. Torpedo boat attack on Dover Barrage
- Second Battle of Dover Strait – 1917. Attack on Dover Barrage
- Battle of Cocos
- Raid on Scarborough, Hartlepool and Whitby – 1914. Bombardment of British east coast ports.
- Pursuit of Goeben and Breslau
- Bombardment of Yarmouth and Lowestoft – 1916. Bombardment of British east coast ports.
- Battle of Trindade

Minor engagements included the commerce raiding carried out by the SMS Emden, Königsberg, and the sailing ship and commerce raider Seeadler. The Imperial Navy carried out land operations, e.g. operating the long-range Paris Gun which was based on a naval gun. The Siege of Tsingtao (Qingdao) used naval troops as Qingdao was a naval base, and also as the Imperial Navy was directly under the Imperial Government (the German Army was made up of regiments from the various states). Following the Battle of Jutland, the capital ships of the Imperial Navy had been confined to inactive service in harbor. In October 1918, the Imperial Naval Command in Kiel under Admiral Franz von Hipper, without authorization, planned to dispatch the fleet for a last battle against the Royal Navy in the English Channel. The naval order of 24 October 1918 and the preparations to sail first triggered the Kiel Mutiny among the affected sailors and then a general revolution which was to sweep aside the monarchy within a few days.

== Marines ==
The Marines were referred to as Seebataillone (sea battalions). They served in the Prussian Navy, the North German Federal Navy, the Imperial German Navy and in the modern German Navy.

== Naval aviation ==
Friedrich Christiansen in 1918

The Marine-Fliegerabteilung consisted of Zeppelins (airships), observation balloons and fixed-wing aircraft. The main use of the Zeppelins was in reconnaissance over the North Sea and the Baltic, where the endurance of the craft led German warships to a number of Allied vessels. Zeppelin patrolling had priority over any other airship activity. During the entire war around 1,200 scouting flights were made. During 1915 the German Navy had some 15 Zeppelins in commission and was able to have two or more patrolling continuously at any one time. They kept the British ships from approaching Germany, spotted when and where the British were laying sea-mines, and later aided in the destruction of those mines. Zeppelins would sometimes land on the sea surface next to a minesweeper, bring aboard an officer and show him the lay of the mines. The Naval and Army Air Services also directed a number of strategic raids against Britain, leading the way in bombing techniques and also forcing the British to bolster their anti-aircraft defences. The possibility of airship raids were approved by the Kaiser on 9 January 1915, although he excluded London as a target and further demanded that no attacks be made on historic or government buildings or museums. The night-time raids were intended to target only military sites on the east coast and around the Thames estuary, but difficulties in navigation and the height from which the bombs were dropped made accurate bombing impossible, and most bombs fell on civilian targets or open countryside.

Stationed in North Sea coastal airfields, German naval aircraft often fought against their British counterparts of the Royal Naval Air Service. Naval pilots flew aircraft that were also used by the German Army's Luftstreitkräfte in addition to seaplanes. Theo Osterkamp was one of the original naval pilots, the first German pilot to fly a land-based aircraft to England on a reconnaissance mission, and its leading ace with 32 victories. By war's end, the roster of German naval flying aces also included Gotthard Sachsenberg (31 victories), Alexander Zenzes (18 victories), Friedrich Christiansen (13 victories), Karl Meyer (8 victories), Karl Scharon (8 victories), and Hans Goerth (7 victories). Another decorated aviator was Gunther Plüschow who shot down a Japanese plane during the Siege of Tsingtao and was the only German combatant to escape from a prison camp in Britain.

List of aircraft that were assigned to naval air service:

- Kaiserliche Werft Danzig 1105 – trainer
- Hansa-Brandenburg W.12 – fighter floatplane
- Hansa-Brandenburg W.29 – fighter floatplane

Naval Air Service Units included Marine Jagdgruppe Flandern composed of:

- Marine Feld Jasta I
- Marine Feldflieger Abteilung II

== Post-war ==
After the end of World War I, the bulk of the navy's modern ships (74 in all) were interned at Scapa Flow (November 1918), where the entire fleet (with a few exceptions) was scuttled by its crews on 21 June 1919 on orders from its commander, Rear Admiral Ludwig von Reuter. Ernest Cox subsequently salvaged many of the Scapa Flow ships. The surviving ships of the Imperial Navy became the basis for the Reichsmarine of the Weimar Republic.

== Command, leadership and control ==
The administration of the Imperial German Navy in the late nineteenth and early twentieth centuries was characterized by a complex, fragmented hierarchy under the direct authority of the German Emperor (Kaiser). From 1899 onward, the Kaiser served as the supreme commander of the navy, with a variety of offices and commands reporting directly to him. These included the heads of the Naval Cabinet, the Naval Staff, the High Seas Fleet Command, the Cruiser Squadron, the naval stations on the North and Baltic Seas, commanders of ships on foreign stations, and the State Secretary of the Naval Administration, a post notably held by Grand Admiral von Tirpitz. Tirpitz oversaw a broad naval administration encompassing personnel, technical, and educational departments, yet he was denied overall operational command, a situation that contributed to conflicting strategic directives within the navy.

Unlike the centralized command structure of the German Army, the navy lacked unified professional leadership. All significant orders required the personal approval of the Kaiser, which both limited efficient decision-making and fostered bureaucratic rivalries. Tirpitz's efforts to consolidate command under his authority were rebuffed, and he was eventually removed in March 1916. Not until September 1918, with Admiral Reinhard Scheer's establishment of the Seekriegsleitung (Operational Command) at the Grand Headquarters at Spa, did the navy briefly achieve something approaching a centralized high command, effectively reducing the emperor's direct control. Administratively, the navy was divided into territorial and overseas commands. The North Sea and Baltic coasts each had their own naval station, while six overseas stations oversaw foreign deployments. The principal German overseas base was at Qingdao in China, with other ships dispersed in the Mediterranean, the Caribbean, East Africa, West Africa, and the South Pacific. The office of Inspector-General, held by Grand Admiral Prince Heinrich von Preussen, provided an additional layer of oversight.

The legal basis for the Kaiser's authority over the navy was enshrined in Article 53 of the 1871 Constitution, which vested supreme command, organization, and officer appointments in the monarch, who also received the direct oath of allegiance from naval officers. Kaiser Wilhelm II, upon his accession, further centralized and personalized naval administration, reorganizing his military entourage into a maison militaire and establishing the Navy Cabinet (Marine-Kabinett) in 1889 as a counterpart to the Military Cabinet. The Navy Cabinet handled the transmission of imperial orders, personnel appointments, honorary matters, and naval correspondence. Gustav Freiherr von Senden-Bibran led the Navy Office until 1906, succeeded by Georg Alexander von Müller until the end of the monarchy in 1918.

Administrative and operational responsibilities were further divided in 1889, when the Imperial Admiralty was dissolved. Strategic command was given to a new Chief of the High Command of the Navy (Oberkommando), equivalent to a commanding general in the army, while administrative control fell to the State Secretary of the Imperial Navy Office (Reichs-Marine-Amt), who managed construction, maintenance, and a wide array of non-operational matters. The Navy Office grew to encompass ten major departments covering central administration, shipyards, logistics, armaments, medical affairs, intelligence, general naval affairs, construction, navigation, and legal matters. In 1899, Wilhelm II replaced the High Command with the Admiralty Staff (Admiralstab), a small body with limited peacetime functions related to strategy, training, intelligence, and planning. Its wartime role, however, was to conduct naval operations, though always subject to the Kaiser's approval. Leadership of the fleet itself shifted over time, eventually consolidating under the Chief of the High Sea Fleet after 1907.

== Recruitment and training ==
=== Officers ===
The training and recruitment process of the Imperial German Navy was marked by rigorous selection procedures, a strong emphasis on social background, and an extensive system of education and training for its officer candidates. The main body responsible for officer recruitment was the Inspektion des Bildungswesens der Marine (Education Department of the Navy), which was established as an independent authority in 1895 and placed in charge of the Sea Cadet Entrance Commission. The inspector of this department had significant autonomy, especially in the selection of naval officer cadets, with final authority resting with the Kaiser. Even after a 1907 reorganization placed the department under the command of the Baltic naval station and revoked its direct reporting to the Kaiser, the inspector retained decisive control over the admission of sea cadets and could appoint his own commission members.

The Sea Cadet Entrance Commission operated with considerable discretion, holding closed deliberations, keeping no formal records, and issuing decisions that were not subject to appeal except in the case of high-profile applicants. The selection process was guided by clear social and educational principles, reflecting the long-standing values of the German officer corps. Emphasis was placed on recruiting candidates of high social standing and appropriate upbringing, as set out by Wilhelm I in 1879, who prioritized the quality and homogeneity of cadet backgrounds over sheer numbers, aiming to foster cohesion within the officer corps. Although a reformist “New Course” in officer selection was briefly introduced at the close of the nineteenth century, this was soon abandoned by Wilhelm II, who instead favored candidates from established officer families, loyal monarchist lineages, and families notable in Prussian or German state history.

A close study of the 1907 cadet intake, known as the “Crew of 1907,” provides insight into the typical social background of naval officer recruits. Of the 197 accepted applicants, only 11 percent were from noble families, most of them Prussian, while the majority were drawn from the educated and loyal Prussian middle class. Fathers of these cadets were often academics, officers, merchants, professionals, or estate owners. Educational backgrounds varied: most had completed the Abitur (the German university entrance qualification), but others came from primary or secondary schools, and some entered from military academies without the Abitur. Geographically, most cadets hailed from northern Germany, especially Prussia and the coastal regions, with only a minority from the south. Notably, there was a conscious, if limited, effort to include a small proportion of cadets from lower social strata, possibly as a gesture to the Reichstag.

Applications for the navy had to be submitted in August and September of the previous year and had to include school reports covering all subjects and a medical certificate. In addition, parents had to submit a commitment to pay the 300 marks for initial equipment and the annual payments of 200 marks and monthly payments of 10 marks. In total, parents had to pay a sum of approximately 6765 marks during their son's first eight to nine years of service, even though he was already being paid.

Training at the Naval School in Kiel was strict and disciplined, with cadets expected to conduct themselves as officers and gentlemen. The school imposed a spartan lifestyle: drinking, smoking, gambling, and music-making were forbidden in quarters. The curriculum was intensive, with 41 hours of instruction in the summer and 39 in the winter. Navigation and seamanship received the greatest emphasis, followed by mechanics, artillery, hydraulics, mathematics, shipbuilding, and, interestingly, even dancing. Additional instruction covered ship types, mine deployment, foreign languages, gymnastics, and horseback riding.

The pathway for officer candidates began with entry as a naval cadet at Mürwik in April, followed by basic infantry training lasting one and a half months. This was succeeded by ten and a half months of practical training aboard training ships, focusing on navigation, engine tending, and stoking. Advancement to the rank of midshipman (Fähnrich zur See) was followed by a year at the Naval School at Kiel with a strong focus on science and engineering, culminating in a main examination for executive officers. Further specialized training in gunnery, torpedo warfare, and infantry practice lasted six months, after which cadets served aboard warships for a year, with promotion and commissioning as ensigns upon successful performance.

=== Ratings ===
Beyond the ranks of the officer corps, the Imperial German Navy implemented a comprehensive system of conscription and voluntary service to meet its personnel needs. All men over seventeen who had acquired at least three months’ experience on ships or rivercraft were subject to conscription for military service. Technical volunteers, often drawn from specialized professions, committed to three years of active service and then entered the reserve for an additional four years. Boys could join the navy from the age of sixteen, and after their initial training, they could qualify as theoretical non-commissioned officers, thereby opening a pathway for early advancement within the naval hierarchy.

Within this broader framework, the system of Einjährig-Freiwillige (one-year volunteers) provided further avenues for service and advancement. Eligible for this pathway were conscripts from the rural population who possessed a certificate of scientific aptitude for one-year voluntary service. These individuals could serve in the naval artillery and marine infantry without exception, in the shipyard divisions and among the engineering personnel of the torpedo departments if they could demonstrate two years of practical experience in steam engine construction, or in the shipyard divisions if they had studied shipbuilding or mechanical engineering at a technical university.

Professional sailors and engineers who worked on sea and river steamers enjoyed certain privileges during their year of service, notably exemption from having to provide their own clothing, equipment, and food—provisions that otherwise applied to one-year volunteers as they did in the army. One-year volunteers were generally free to choose their naval base and garrison within specified limits; for professional sailors and engineers, special requests were considered when service requirements allowed.

The training and advancement opportunities for one-year volunteers were structured to identify and nurture those suitable for higher responsibility. Volunteers deemed suitable for potential officer careers received special training. Those who met expectations were typically promoted after six months to the status of supernumerary petty officers—such as corporals, senior seaman artillerymen, and senior engineer cadets—and in the later months of their year to full petty officers (non-commissioned officers). Upon completion of their service year, these individuals were appointed as officer cadets. Other one-year volunteers, if judged suitable, could also be promoted during their service to supernumerary petty officers and, upon discharge, to non-commissioned officers in the reserve, and might be considered for appointment as deck officer (deputy officer) candidates. The same progression was possible for three-year and multi-year volunteers when vacancies permitted.

Training for sailors was centralized in the main sailor divisions located in Kiel and Wilhelmshaven, ensuring uniformity and high standards in naval education. At the ship's boy division in Friedrichsort, special emphasis was placed on cultivating a capable and disciplined new generation of non-commissioned officers, particularly for assignment within the broader sailor divisions. In this way, the navy maintained a steady flow of technically skilled and socially reliable personnel, whether through direct conscription, voluntary service, or specialized youth training. The system as a whole reflected both the navy's operational needs and the broader social values of Imperial Germany, combining structured opportunity with selective advancement to create a professional and disciplined force.

== Ranks and ratings ==
The Imperial German Navy's rank and rating system combined that of Prussia's with the navies of other northern states.

== War crimes ==
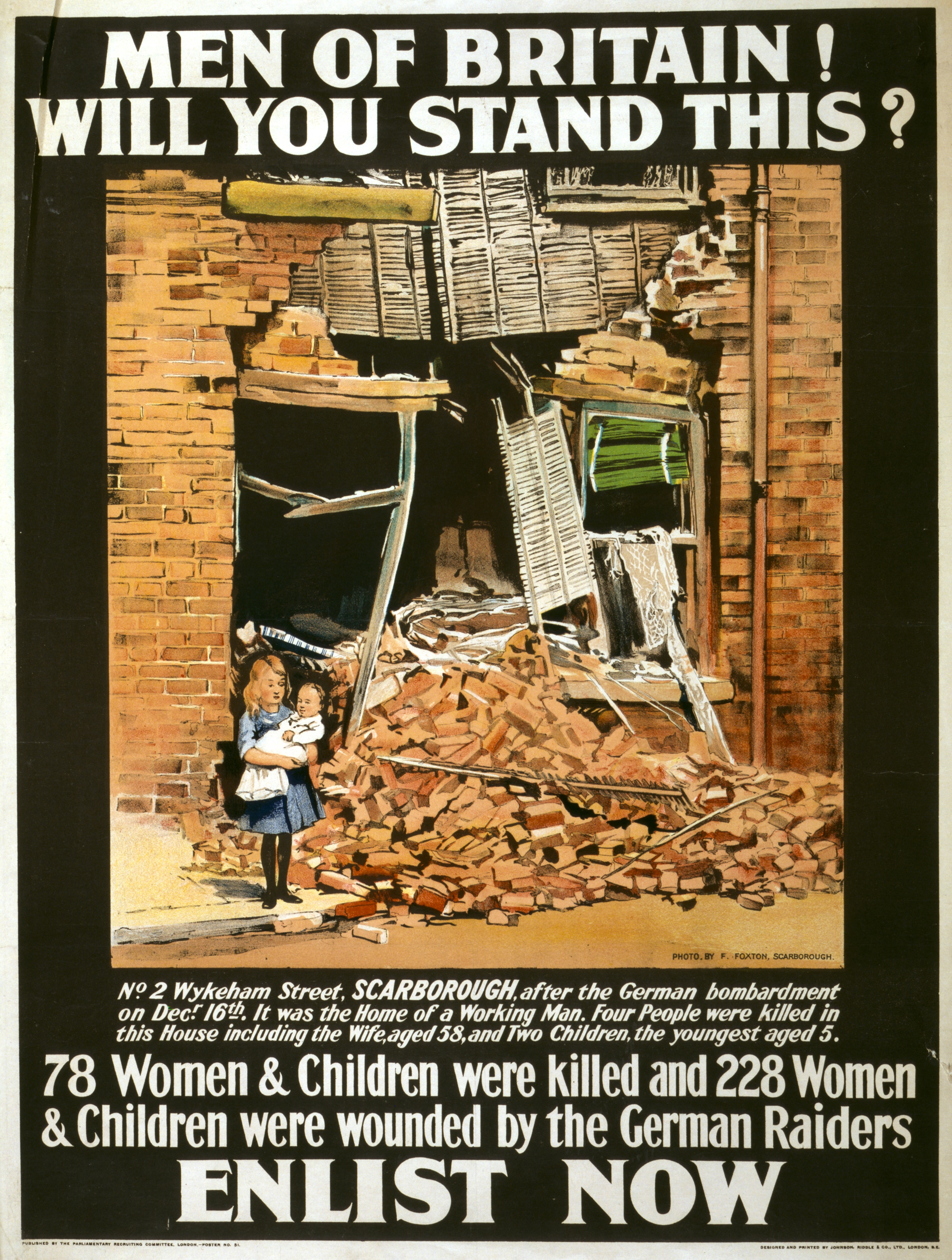
Poster condemning the 1914 Raid on Scarborough

The Imperial German Navy was implicated in several war crimes committed during the First World War, most notably:

- Raid on Scarborough, Hartlepool and Whitby in 1914, in which several British ports were bombarded causing 112 civilian deaths.
- The U-boat campaign. Prize rules, which required commerce raiders to warn their targets and allow time for the crew to board lifeboats were disregarded and commercial vessels were sunk regardless of nationality, cargo, or destination. Following the 1915 sinking of the RMS Lusitania the practice was withdrawn, but was then resumed in February 1917. This outraged the U.S. public, prompting the U.S. to enter the war on Allied side.
- The execution of the civilian captain Charles Fryatt, who, while in command of the passenger ship SS Brussels, attempted to ram the submarine U-33.
- The sinking of the hospital ships HMHS Llandovery Castle, HS Koningin Regentes and HMHS Dover Castle.

== See also ==
- Anglo-German naval arms race – Early 20th-century arms race between the United Kingdom and Germany
- German entry into World War I
- German Imperial Admiralty – Imperial naval authority of Imperial German Navy (1872-89)
- Imperial German plans for the invasion of the United Kingdom – Imperial German war plans
- Kriegsmarine – Navy of Nazi Germany (1935–1945)
- List of naval ships of Germany
- List of ships of the Imperial German Navy
- Marine-Regatta-Verein
- Naval warfare of World War I
- Reichsflotte
