= LZ 18 (L 2) =

Short-lived, pre-WWI German airship

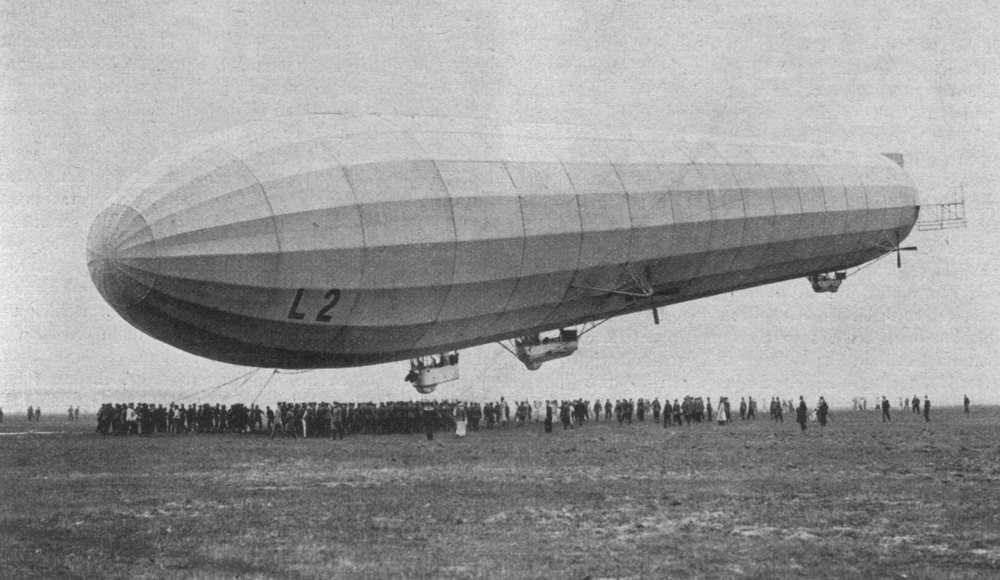

General information
- Type: Reconnaissance/bomber airship
- National origin: Germany
- Manufacturer: Luftschiffbau Zeppelin
- Primary user: Imperial German Navy
- Number built: 1

History
- First flight: 9 September 1913

LZ 18 (Navy designation L 2) was a German military Zeppelin built for the Imperial German Navy in 1913. Intended as the Navy's second airship, it was destroyed during an altitude trial on 17 October 1913, killing all 28 crew members before it could enter operational service.

== Design ==
On 18 January 1913 Admiral Alfred von Tirpitz, Secretary of State of the German Imperial Naval Office, got Kaiser Wilhelm II to agree to a five-year expansion program of German naval airship strength. A contract was placed for the first airship on 30 January, one requirement being that the craft should be capable of bombing England. The design was heavily influenced by the naval architect Felix Pietzker, who was an advisor to the German Admiralty Aviation Department.

Construction started in May. The length and overall height of the ship were limited by the size of the Navy's airship shed at Fuhlsbüttel, but Pietzker's proposals enabled the diameter of the airship to be increased without increasing overall height firstly by changing the position of the keel, moving it from outside the main hull structure to within it, and secondly by placing the engine cars closer to the hull.

It was powered by four 130 kilowatts (180 hp) Maybach C-X engines in two engine cars, each car driving a pair of four-bladed propellers which were mounted either side of the envelope via driveshafts and bevel gears. The ship was controlled from a third gondola mounted in front of the forward engine car.

== Operational history ==
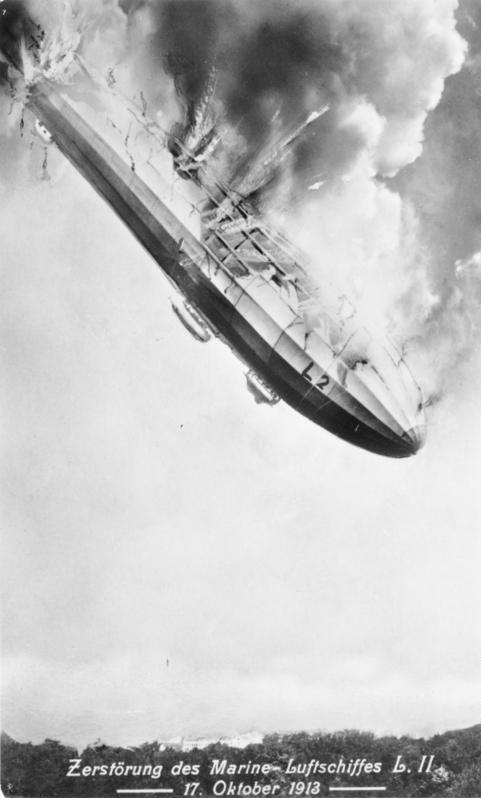
LZ 18 (L 2)

LZ 18 was first flown on 6 September at Friedrichshafen, and following a number of trial flights was flown to Johannisthal on 20 September for naval acceptance trial to begin, the flight of about 700 km (438 mi) taking twelve hours. The ship's tenth flight was to be an altitude trial and was scheduled for 17 October. The airship was removed from its shed in the morning but takeoff was delayed because one of the engines would not start.

The delay of two hours while the engine was repaired allowed the morning sun to heat the hydrogen, causing it to expand. This caused the airship to ascend rapidly to 610 m (2,000 ft), when horrified observers on the ground saw a flame leap out of the forward engine car, causing the explosion of some of the gasbags. Halfway to the ground there was a second explosion, and as the wreckage hit the ground further explosions followed as the fuel tanks ignited. Three survivors were pulled from the blazing wreckage, but two died shortly afterwards. The third died that night in hospital.

All 28 men died, including Pietzker, and the new chief of the Admiralty Aviation Department, Korvettenkapitän Behnisch, the successor to Korvettenkapitän Metzing who had been killed in the L 1 on 9 September. The accident was agreed to have been caused by the rapid ascent leading to venting of hydrogen through the relief valves, which in Zeppelins of the period were placed at the bottom of the bags, without vent trunks to convey any hydrogen let off to the top of the ship. Some of the vented gas was then sucked into the forward engine car, where it was ignited, the fire then spreading to the gasbags.

== Aftermath ==
The loss of the L 2 occurred six weeks after the loss of the L 1 with most of its crew. The two disasters deprived the Navy of most of its experienced personnel and led to the suspension of the planned expansion program. The death of Korvettenkapitän Behnisch led to the appointment of Peter Strasser as the new head of the Admiralty Aviation Department.

== Specifications ==
Data from Zeppelin in Combat: History of the German Naval Airship Division, 1912-18

General characteristics

- Crew: 15
- Length: 157.94 m (518 ft 2 in)
- Diameter: 16.61 m (54 ft 6 in)
- Volume: 27,000 m^{3} (953,000 cu ft)
- Empty weight: 20,185 kg (44,500 lb)
- Useful lift: 11,100 kg (24,500 lb)
- Powerplant: 4 × Maybach C-X six cylinder inline water-cooled piston engines, 130 kW (180 hp) each

Performance

- Maximum speed: 76 km/h (47 mph, 41 kn)
