= Office of Integrative Art =

The Office of Integrative Art (German: Büro für Integrative Kunst) is a German group of artists. Based on artistic practices and current discussions of public processes, the office was founded in 2000. Since then Jörg Amonat (born 1960) and Stefan Krüskemper (born 1963) have developed suggestions and realized contributions in changing team constellations. Fields of work are public art, the urban space, and contemporary art strategies.

Solo projects have included:

- 2007 The Intricate Journey, artist exchange, Neue Gesellschaft für Bildende Kunst, Berlin
- 2006 Air Borne, public art, Aerodynamic Park, Berlin
- 1998 Media Installation, art and architecture, Frankenhalle, Nuremberg

Group exhibitions have included:

- 2007 El Viaje Intricado, Lugar a Dudas, Cali
- 2004 Permanent produktiv, Kunsthalle Exnergasse, Vienna
- 2002 life policies Galerie zé dos bois, Lisbon
- 2001 Utopic Procedures, Westspace Gallery, Melbourne

== Bibliography ==
- "parkTV", Ed. Verlag für integrative Kunst, Berlin, 2005, ISBN 3-906086-90-9
- "AIR BORNE", Ed. Verlag für integrative Kunst, Berlin, 2006, ISBN 3-00-018996-3
