= Johannisthal air disaster =

1913 in-flight German airship explosion

Coordinates: 52°26′12″N 13°31′4″E

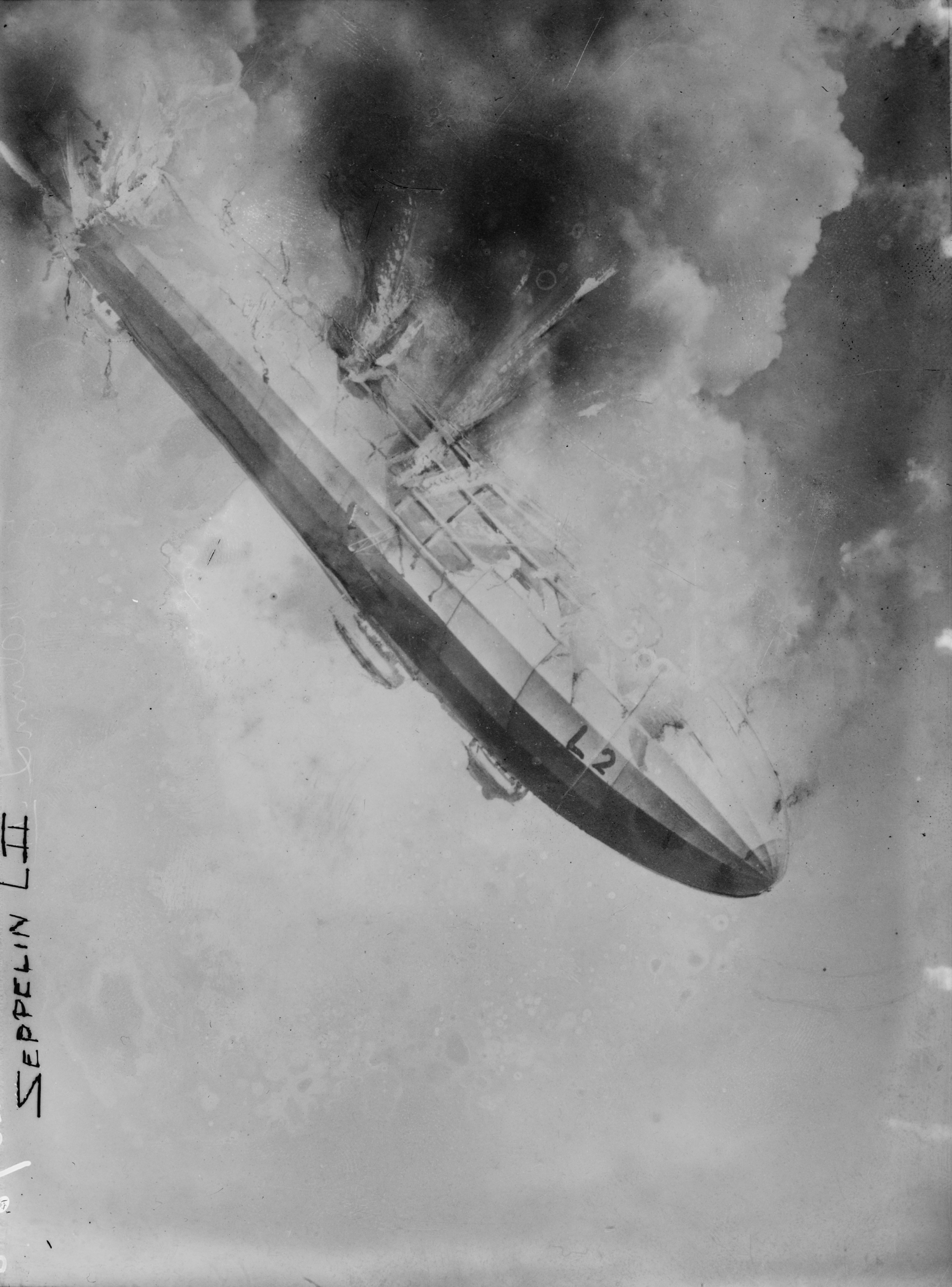
- Painting of LZ18 descending in flames after the engine fire.

Accident
- Date: 17 October 1913; 112 years ago
- Summary: In-flight explosion
- Site: near Johannisthal Air Field

Aircraft
- Aircraft type: Airship
- Aircraft name: LZ18 (manufacturer's designation)
- Operator: Imperial German Navy
- Registration: L 2 (military designation)
- Crew: 28
- Fatalities: 28
- Survivors: 0

The Johannisthal air disaster involved the Imperial German Navy's L 2 airship manufactured by Luftschiffbau Zeppelin as LZ 18. Its test flight resulted in the death of all 28 passengers and crew on board. On 17 October 1913, at approximately 10:30 am local time, hydrogen gas which was being vented was sucked into the forward engine and ignited causing the airship to explode and burn. It crashed near Johannisthal Air Field about 16 kilometres (10 mi) southeast of Berlin. The accident occurred a little over a month after the Helgoland Island Air Disaster.

== Accident ==
The "Almanac and Year-Book for 1914" reported that the airship "was destroyed by the explosion of a gasoline tank, which occurred as the ship was making a trial trip above the city of Johannisthal, near Berlin. All except one of the twenty-seven military men on board, including the entire admiralty trial board, were killed.

Thousands of people who had been watching the evolutions of the L-2, which, if accepted, was to have been the flagship of Germany's new aerial fleet, heard a heavy detonation and saw the craft suddenly become enveloped in flames and drop to the ground from a height of 270 metres (900 ft).

On reaching the spot in the road where the wreckage of the airship had fallen the spectators found nothing but a mass of crumpled aluminum and twisted wreckage. The only man found alive was Lieut. Baron von Bieul, a guest on the trip, who was fatally injured. The passengers of the center gondola were blown through the sides of the car by the explosion and their bodies fell a quarter of a mile away from the wreck of the dirigible.

The pilot of the airship was Capt. Gluth, who had been in Count Zeppelin's employ for a long time.

The admiralty trial board consisted of seven officers, including Lieutenant-Commander Behnish, and Lieut. Freyer, both personal friends of Emperor William, Naval Constructors Neumann and Pietzler, Naval Engineer Busch, Lieut. Trenk and Chief Engineer Haussmann were among the others killed."
