= Aerodynamic Park =

Coordinates: 52°25′57″N 13°31′45″E

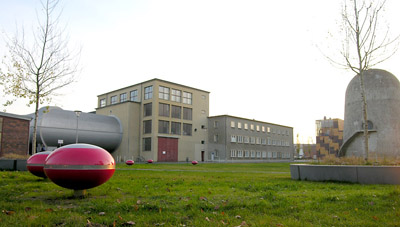
Aerodynamic Park in Berlin Adlershof

The Aerodynamic Park (German: Aerodynamischer Park) of the Humboldt University in Berlin-Adlershof was once part of the German Johannisthal Air Field.

Laboratories, motor test beds, wind tunnels and hangars, erected in the 20s and 30s, are historical landmarks of the Aerodynamic Park today. On the grassy areas of the park is the site-specific sound art "Air Borne" (Stefan Krüskemper with the collaboration of Karlheinz Essl) located, in a loose spatial relation to the monuments of the German Experimental Institute for Aviation and the exceptional university buildings (Architects: Volker Staab with Alfred Nieuwenhuizen, Georg Augustin and Ute Frank, a.o.). The park is the green center of the Campus Berlin-Adlershof.
