= Karl Meyer (aviator) =

- Born: 29 January 1894; Mulhouse, Alsace-Lorraine, German Empire
- Died: 31 December 1917 (aged 23); Leipzig, Germany
- Military career
- Allegiance: German Empire
- Branch: (German Empire) Marinefliegerkorps
- Rank: Oberflugmeister
- Units: See-Flug Station 1; Marine Feld Jager 1
- Awards: Iron Cross

Oberflugmeister Karl Meyer was a German World War I flying ace credited with eight aerial victories. He was Germany's first naval ace, and one of the few German two-seater aces.

== Biography ==
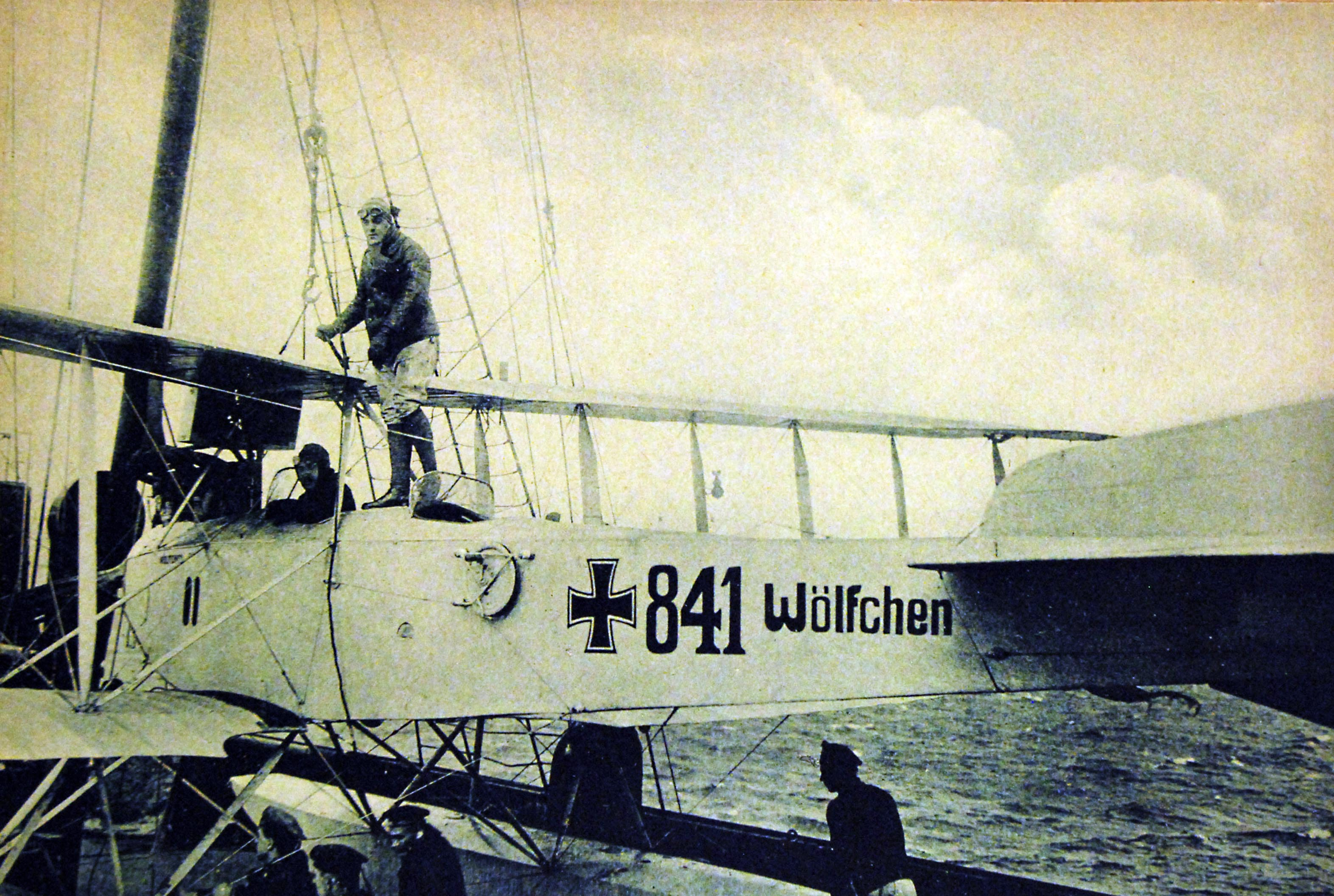
A Friedrichshafen FF.33. Photo taken 1 July 1916.

Karl Meyer was born on 29 January 1894 in Mulhouse, Alsace-Lorraine, then part of the German Empire. During his World War I flying service, he was attached to the Marinefliegerkorps (German Naval Air Service). His unit, See-Flug Station 1 was stationed at Zeebrugge. Its duties consisted of using seaplanes for a mixed bag of reconnaissance sorties, bombing raids on England, and aerial combat overwater.

Meyer flew a Friedrichshafen FF.33 with Leutnant zur See Erich Bönisch as his aerial observer. On 17 July 1916, they shot down a French FBA flying boat. They followed that with a twin engine Caudron destroyed north of Ostend, Belgium on 2 August. Three days later, having switched mounts to Brandenburg LW, they were credited with another French FBA over Middelkerke. On 7 September 1916, they drove down a Caudron, but the victory claim was not confirmed.

Having switched observers to Karl Elsasser, Meyer claimed two victories on 1 October 1916, one of which was confirmed. Meyer and Elsasser then used a Friedrichshafen FF.33 to down a FBA off Zeebrugge for his fifth confirmed victory. Karl Meyer became the German Naval Air Service's first flying ace, and one of the few German two-seater aces.

On 1 February 1917, using a Rumpler D.I, Meyer drove a Sopwith Pup down into captivity at Bredene; the captured machine was subsequently given German markings.

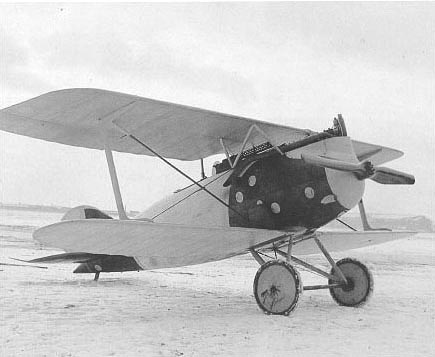
A Rumpler D.1

On 21 April 1917, Meyer and his observer, Oberflugmeister Kastner, were credited with bringing down Airship C.17 east of North Foreland, England. Meyer then transferred to a naval fighter unit, Marine Feld Jager 1. On 22 June, while with them, he shot down an Airco DH.4 from No. 57 Squadron RFC southwest of Diksmuide at 2145 hours.

Karl Meyer returned to Sea-Flug Station 1, but scored no more. He was killed in action; however, there are differing accounts of his end. One says his Pfalz D.III fighter was shot down in flames on 12 November 1917 by Samuel Kinkead and James Henry Forman. Two other sources say he died on 31 December 1917. One of these accounts states he died of injuries from an aviation accident; another says he was wounded in action on 28 December and expired from his wounds on the 31st. He had been honored with the Iron Cross before his death.
