= HMS Velox =

Two ships of the Royal Navy have borne the name HMS Velox, Latin for 'swift':

- HMS Velox (1902) was a Viper-class destroyer, formerly named Python when owned by her builder, launched speculatively in 1902 and purchased that year. She was sunk by a mine in 1915.
- HMS Velox (D34) was a V-class destroyer launched in 1917, converted to a long range escort in 1942 and scrapped in 1947.
