= Karl Scharon =

German flying ace

- Born: 15 May 1892
- Died: 26 May 1921 (aged 29)
- Military career
- Allegiance: Germany
- Branch: Aviation
- Rank: Vizeflugmeister
- Unit: Marine Feld Jasta 2
- Awards: Iron Cross

Vizeflugmeister Karl Scharon was a World War I flying ace credited with eight aerial victories.

== Biography ==
Karl Scharon was born on 15 May 1892.

He first came to notice when he was flying a Fokker D.VII for Marine Feld Jagdstaffel 2. The German naval fighter squadron was based at Jabbeke, Belgium. Scharon was promoted to Vizefeldmeister on 16 August 1918.

Scharon scored his first aerial victory on 20 September 1918, when he shot down a Sopwith Camel from No. 204 Squadron RAF over Pervyse at 1005 hours. On 7 October, he downed another Camel south of Blankenberge, Belgium along with an Airco DH.9. He then destroyed a third Camel on 14 October over Roeselare, and a Sopwith Dolphin the following day, running his total to five. He was credited with an "enemy aircraft" for his next victory, date and location uncertain. Then he shot down a Camel from 204 Squadron on both 23 and 27 October 1918, running his tally to eight.

Scharon survived the war, having been awarded the Iron Cross First Class, and joined in the postwar fighting by joining the Marine Freikorps in Latvia and other Baltic nations. He perished on 26 May 1921. He scored all of his victories flying the D.VII.
