= Johannisthal Air Field =

Former airport in Berlin, between Johannisthal and Adlershof

Johannisthal Air Field Flugplatz Johannisthal
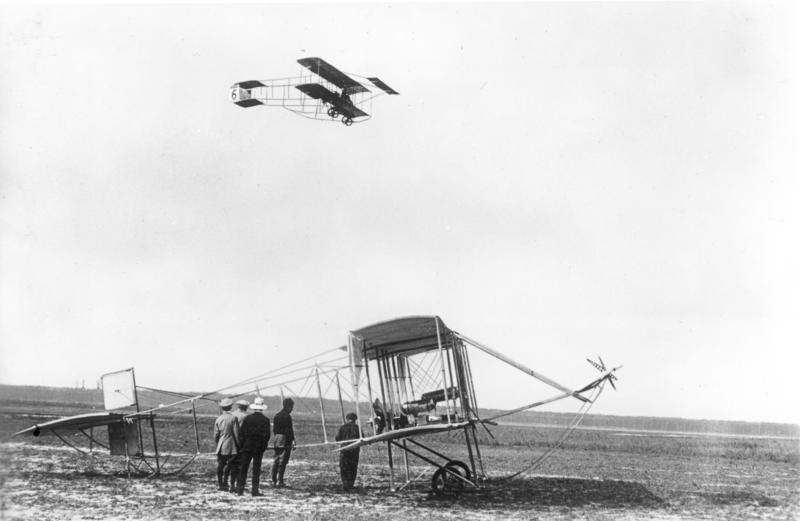
- Flugplatz Berlin-Johannisthal, 1910
- IATA: none; ICAO: none

Summary
- Location: Berlin, between Johannisthal and Adlershof
- Opened: September 26, 1909
- Closed: 1952
- Coordinates: 52°26′12″N 13°31′4″E

Map
- Location of Johannisthal Air Field Johannisthal Air Field (Germany)

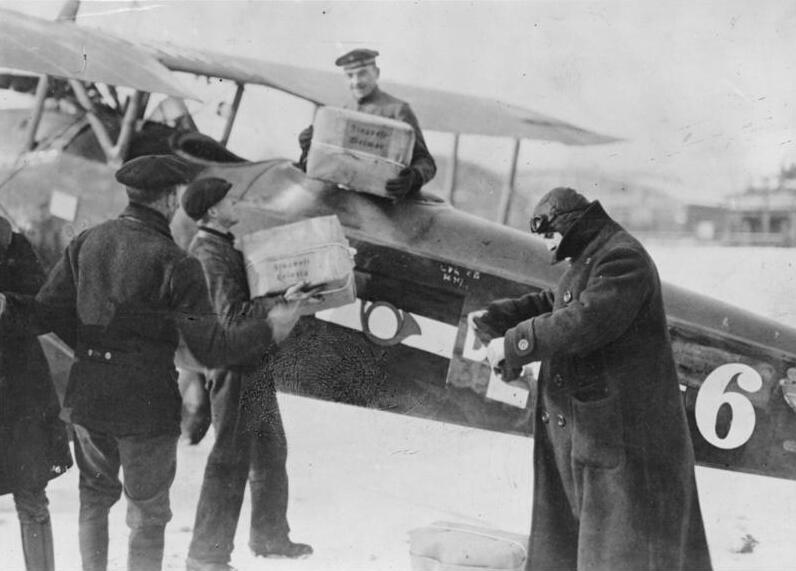
Delivery of air mail, 1919

The Johannisthal Air Field, located 15 km (9.3 mi) southeast of central Berlin, between Johannisthal and Adlershof, was Germany's first commercial airfield. It opened on 26 September 1909, a few weeks after the world's first airfield at Rheims, France.

== Overview ==
Known as the birthplace of heavier-than-air flight in Germany, Johannistal was Berlin's primary airport until the Tempelhofer Field was developed in the 1920s. It was the first commercial airfield (and second overall) to be established in Germany, after Griesheim Airport in Darmstadt.

Johannistal was the field from which Germany's first commercial flights took off. Numerous aviation pioneers operated workshops there, including Anthony Fokker. Amelie Beese, the first German woman to earn a pilot's license, trained there.

Later, the area became known as Adlershof, and before the collapse of the Berlin Wall, it was closed to the public. The former airport was used by the National People's Army as a military training ground; while the Academy of Sciences of the GDR (with 14 natural science-technical institutions and six service centres) employed approximately 5,500 scientists and technicians.

Following the reunification of Germany, some of these research institutions were taken over by West German institutions, along with about 1,400 of the employees.

Today, the Johannisthal field is a major urban development associated with the Berlin-Adlershof City of Science and Technology. By 2003, plans were made to build a new district on the 4.2 square kilometres (1.6 sq mi) property. The area will accommodate high-tech industries, science and research institutes and a congress centre, as well as a sport and recreation centre. The former home of the East German TV, Deutscher Fernsehfunk, will be transformed into a media centre. In total, there will be 30,000 jobs and housing for 15,000 people.

Laboratories, motor test beds, wind tunnels and hangars, erected in the 1920s and 1930s by the German Experimental Institute for Aviation (Deutsche Versuchsanstalt für Luftfahrt – DVL, the ancestor of today's DLR), are historical landmarks of the Aerodynamic Park today. Approximately 65 hectares (160 acres) of the former runway areas were converted into a protected green space.

== Accidents ==
The 1913 Johannisthal Air Disaster happened close to the air field, killing all 28 passengers.
The German astronaut Reinhard Furrer died on September 9, 1995, during a historic flight show.
