= 1964 Birthday Honours =

British government recognitions

The Queen's Birthday Honours 1964 were appointments in many of the Commonwealth realms of Queen Elizabeth II to various orders and honours to reward and highlight good works by citizens of those countries.

The appointments were made to celebrate the official birthday of The Queen. They were announced on 13 June 1964 for the United Kingdom, Australia, New Zealand, Sierra Leone, and Jamaica.

The recipients of honours are displayed here as they were styled before their new honour, and arranged by honour, with classes (Knight, Knight Grand Cross, etc.) and then divisions (Military, Civil, etc.) as appropriate.

== United Kingdom and Colonies ==
=== Viscount ===
- The Right Honourable John Scott Maclay, CH, CMG, MP, Member of Parliament for Renfrewshire West since 1950; Member for Montrose Burghs, 1940–1950. Parliamentary Secretary to the Ministry of Production, 1945; Minister of Transport and Civil Aviation, 1951–1952; Minister of State for Colonial Affairs, 1956–1957; Secretary of State for Scotland, 1957–1962. President of the National Liberal Council since 1957. For political and public services.
- The Right Honourable Harold Arthur Watkinson, CH, MP, Member of Parliament for Woking since 1950. Parliamentary Private Secretary to the Minister of Transport, 1951–1952, and Parliamentary Secretary to the Ministry of Labour and National Service, 1952–1955. Minister of Transport and Civil Aviation, 1955–1959; Minister of Defence, 1959–1962. For political and public services.

=== Baron ===
- The Right Honourable Lord John Adrian Hope, MP, Member of Parliament for the Pentlands Division of Edinburgh since 1950, and for Northern Midlothian and Peebles, 1945–1950. Joint Under-Secretary of State for Foreign Affairs 1954–1956; Under-Secretary of State for Commonwealth Relations, 1956–1957; Joint Under-Secretary of State for Scotland, 1957–1959; Minister of Works, 1959–1962. For political and public services.
- Sir Roger Mellor Makins, GCB, GCMG, chairman, United Kingdom Atomic Energy Authority, 1960–1964.
- William Morgan Fletcher-Vane, TD, DL, MP, Member of Parliament for Westmorland since 1945. Parliamentary Private Secretary to the Minister of Agriculture and Fisheries, 1951–1954; to the Joint Under-Secretary of State for Foreign Affairs, 1954–1955, and to the Minister of Health, 1955–1956. Joint Parliamentary Secretary to the Ministry of Pensions and National Insurance, 1958–1960, and to the Ministry of Agriculture, Fisheries and Food, 1960–1962. For political and public services.

=== Privy Councillor ===
- Andrew Robert Buxton, The Most Noble Duke of Devonshire, MC, Parliamentary Under-Secretary of State for Commonwealth Relations 1960–1962; Minister of State for Commonwealth Relations and for the Colonies since 1962.
- Peter John Mitchell Thomas, MP, Member of Parliament for Conway Division of Caernarvonshire since 1951; Parliamentary Private Secretary to the Solicitor-General 1954–1959; Parliamentary Secretary to Ministry of Labour 1959–1961; Joint Parliamentary Under-Secretary of State, Foreign Office 1961–1963; Minister of State for Foreign Affairs since 1963.

=== Baronet ===
- John Charles Rodgers, MP, Member of Parliament for Sevenoaks since 1950. Parliamentary Private Secretary to the Right Honourable Viscount Eccles at the Ministries of Works and Education and the Board of Trade, 1951–1957; Parliamentary Secretary to the Board of Trade, 1958–1960. For political and public services.
- Rolf Dudley-Williams, MP, Member of Parliament for Exeter since 1951. Parliamentary Private Secretary to Parliamentary Secretary, Financial Secretary and Civil Lord, Admiralty, 1957–1958; to the Secretary of State for War, 1958, and to the Minister of Agriculture, Fisheries and Food since 1959. Chairman of the Western Area Conservative Associations. For political and public services.

=== Knight Bachelor ===
- Eric Frederick Beckett, CBE. For political services in Dorset and Wessex.
- William Edmund Butlin, MBE, chairman and managing director, Butlins.
- Terence Edward Cawthorne, FRCS, Consultant Otologist, London.
- John Cockram, Alderman and chairman, Hertfordshire County Council.
- Julian Stanley Crossley, chairman, Barclays Bank (Dominion, Commonwealth, Overseas).
- Geoffrey Cecil Ryves Eley, CBE, chairman, Richard Thomas & Baldwins.
- John Scott Fulton, Vice-Chancellor, University of Sussex, and previously Vice-Chancellor, University of Wales.
- John Henderson, JP, DL, MP, Member of Parliament for the Cathcart Division of Glasgow since 1946. Chairman, Scottish Unionist & National Liberals Committee. Member of Glasgow Corporation 1926–1946. For political and public services.
- Thomas Clyde Hewlett, CBE. For political services in Lancashire and Cheshire.
- Edmund Langley Hirst, CBE, Professor of Organic Chemistry, University of Edinburgh.
- Stanley Silverwood Holt. For political and public services in Manchester.
- Lieutenant-Colonel Edmond Joly de Lotbinière. For political services in East Anglia.
- Arnold Lewis George Lindley, chairman, General Electric Company.
- Ronald Long, President, Law Society.
- William McKinney, CBE, chairman, Northern Ireland Hospitals Authority.
- Professor Alan Aird Moncrieff, CBE, MD, FRCP, JP, chairman, Advisory Council on Child Care.
- Charles Norman, CBE, Director, Joseph Rank.
- Brigadier Francis Smith Reid, CBE, Secretary to the Speaker, House of Commons.
- Ian Archibald Richmond, CBE, Professor of the Archaeology of the Roman Empire, University of Oxford.
- John Plowman Ricks, Solicitor, General Post Office.
- Peter Francis Runge, President, Federation of British Industries. Vice-chairman and managing director, Tate & Lyle Refineries.
- Neil Stanley Shields, MC. For political and public services in London and Hampstead.
- Arnold Silverstone. For political services in Middlesex and Essex.
- George Langley-Taylor, chairman, Council for the Preservation of Rural England.
- Colonel Cennydd George Traherne, TD, HM Lieutenant of the County of Glamorgan.
- Alexander Balmain Bruce Valentine, chairman, London Transport Board.
- Professor Edward Johnson Wayne, MD, FRCP, Regius Professor of the Practice of Medicine, University of Glasgow.
- Professor Vincent Brian Wigglesworth, CBE, MD, BCh, Director, Agricultural Research Council Unit of Insect Physiology, Cambridge.
- Harold Wilkinson, CMG, deputy chairman, Shell Transport & Trading Company.
- Harold Woolley, CBE. For services to farming. President, National Farmers' Union.

State of Victoria

- Horace Rostill Petty, Agent-General for Victoria in London.

State of Queensland

- Herbert George Watkin, Director-General of Education, Queensland.

State of Tasmania

- William Edward Lodewyk Hamilton Crowther, CBE, DSO, VD, MB, BS. For services in the fields of medicine and literature in Tasmania.

Commonwealth Relations

- Derek Quicke Erskine. For political and public services in Kenya.
- Albert Ridgeby Foster, formerly President of the Bengal Chamber of Commerce and Industry and of the Associated Chambers of Commerce of India.
- Ian Malcolm Lewis, Attorney-General, Northern Nigeria.
- Henry Ellis Isidore Phillips, CMG, MBE, Minister of Finance, Nyasaland.
- Egbert Udo Udoma, Chief Justice of Uganda.
- Thomas Williams, OBE, ED, formerly Speaker of the Legislative Council, Northern Rhodesia.

Overseas Territories

- Myles John Abbott, Chief Justice of Bermuda.
- Harold George Christie, CBE. For public services in the Bahamas.
- Ivo Charles Clayton Rigby, Senior Puisne Judge, Hong Kong.
- Peter George Russo, CBE, JP. For public services in Gibraltar.

=== Order of the Bath ===
==== Knight Grand Cross of the Order of the Bath (GCB) ====
Military Division

Army

- General Sir Michael West, KCB, DSO, ADC (Gen.) (33582), late Infantry.

Royal Air Force

- Air Chief Marshal Sir Denis Barnett, KCB, CBE, DFC.

==== Knight Commander of the Order of the Bath (KCB) ====
Military Division

Royal Navy

- Vice-Admiral Frank Henry Edward Hopkins, CB, DSO, DSC.

Army

- Lieutenant-General (temporary) Alan Jolly, CB, CBE, DSO (49887), late Royal Armoured Corps; Colonel Commandant, Royal Tank Regiment.

Royal Air Force

- Air Marshal Sir John Grandy, KBE, CB, DSO.

Civil Division

- Philip Allen, CB, Second Secretary, HM Treasury.
- Ronald Henry Melville, CB, Second Permanent Under-Secretary of State, Ministry of Defence.
- David Stephens, CVO, Clerk of the Parliaments, House of Lords.

==== Companion of the Order of the Bath (CB) ====
Military Division

Royal Navy

- Rear-Admiral Anthony Davies.
- Rear-Admiral Gordon Thomas Seccombe Gray, DSC.
- Rear-Admiral John Osler Chattock Hayes, OBE.
- Rear-Admiral Ian Leslie Trower Hogg, DSC.
- Rear-Admiral Horace Collier Lyddon, OBE.
- Rear-Admiral David Parks Mansfield.
- Rear-Admiral Charles Piercy Mills, CBE, DSC.
- Rear-Admiral John Stanley Raven.
- Rear-Admiral Raymond Haydn Tribe, MBE.

Army

- Major-General Arthur Henley Dowson, CBE (40372), late Corps of Royal Engineers.
- Major-General Lewis Trevor Furnivall, DSO, QHS, MRCS, LRCP (52313), late Royal Army Medical Corps.
- Major-General Richard Alan Fyffe, DSO, OBE, MC (53778), late Infantry.
- Major-General Walter Morland Hutton, CBE, DSO, MC (50984), late Royal Armoured Corps.
- Major-General Derek Boileau Lang, DSO, MC (56733), late Infantry.
- Major-General George Harris Lea, DSO, MBE (58116), late Infantry.
- Major-General Herbert John Mogg, CBE, DSO (73153), late Infantry; Colonel Commandant, Army Air Corps.
- Major-General William Arthur Robinson, OBE, QHS, MD (50009), late Royal Army Medical Corps.

Royal Air Force

- Air Vice-Marshal Albert Avion Case, CBE.
- Air Vice-Marshal Geoffrey Charles Eveleigh, OBE.
- Air Vice-Marshal Paul Davie Holder, DSO, DFC.
- Air Vice-Marshal John Bernard Russell, CBE, DSO.
- Air Commodore Arthur Foden, CBE.
- Air Commodore Leslie Deane Mavor, AFC.
- Air Commodore William Kilpatrick Stewart, CBE, AFC, MB, ChB.

Civil Division

- Frank Alexander Adams, Under-Secretary for Finance and Accountant General, Ministry of Health.
- Herbert Jeffery Collins, CBE, lately Under-Secretary, Foreign Office.
- Edward Gelderd Dryburgh, MD, ChB, Chief Medical Officer, Ministry of Pensions and National Insurance.
- Basil Charles Engholm, Under-Secretary, Ministry of Agriculture, Fisheries and Food.
- Sidney Golt, Under-Secretary, Board of Trade.
- Robin Reynolds Goodison, Under-Secretary, Ministry of Aviation.
- Christopher Pascoe Hill, CBE, Chief Commissioner, Charity Commission.
- Howard Owen Hooper, CMG, Assistant Under-Secretary of State, Ministry of Defence.
- James Duncan Jones, Deputy Secretary, Ministry of Housing and Local Government.
- James Henry McGuinness, Under-Secretary, Scottish Development Department.
- James Mackerron Mackay, Deputy Under-Secretary of State, Ministry of Defence.
- William Bonnar Leslie Monson, CMG, Assistant Under-Secretary of State, Colonial Office.
- Colonel Alfred John Page, TD, chairman, Territorial and Auxiliary Forces Association for the County of London.
- Louis Petch, Third Secretary, HM Treasury.
- William Patrick Denny Skillington, Under-Secretary, Ministry of Public Building and Works.

=== Order of Saint Michael and Saint George ===
==== Knight Grand Cross of the Order of St Michael and St George (GCMG) ====
- Sir Arthur Hilton Poynton, KCMG, Permanent Under-Secretary of State, Colonial Office.

==== Knight Commander of the Order of St Michael and St George (KCMG) ====
- Major-General William Henry Alexander Bishop, CB, CMG, CVO, OBE, British High Commissioner in Cyprus.
- The Right Honourable Julian Edward George, Earl of Oxford and Asquith, CMG, Governor and Commander-in-Chief, Seychelles.
- Thomas Eardley Bromley, CMG, Her Majesty's Ambassador Extraordinary and Plenipotentiary (designate) in Algiers.
- Nicolas John Alexander Cheetham, CMG, Her Majesty's Ambassador Extraordinary and Plenipotentiary in Mexico City.
- Robert Hugh Kirk Marett, CMG, OBE, Her Majesty's Ambassador Extraordinary and Plenipotentiary in Lima.
- Gordon Coligny Whitteridge, CMG, OBE, Her Majesty's Ambassador Extraordinary and Plenipotentiary in Rangoon.

==== Companion of the Order of St Michael and St George (CMG) ====
- Robert William Bernard Carter, Assistant Secretary, Board of Trade.
- Graham Douglas Clifford, Secretary, Institution of Electronic & Radio Engineers.
- Ronald Arthur Dickinson, Assistant Secretary, Export Credits Guarantee Department.
- Percy Cyril Claude Garnham, MD, MRCS, Professor of Protozoology, University of London.
- Paul Philip Howell, OBE, Director, Middle East Development Division, Beirut, Department of Technical Co-operation.
- Raymond Frederick Tritton Nottage, Director, Royal Institute of Public Administration.
- Reginald Aubrey Thompson, Assistant Secretary, Department of Education and Science.
- Leonard Bean, MBE, Permanent Secretary, Prime Minister's Office, Northern Rhodesia.
- Gerald Bryan Clarke, ISO, Secretary to the Prime Minister and the Cabinet, Southern Rhodesia.
- Timothy Leland Crosthwait, MBE, British High Commissioner in Zanzibar.
- Albert Henry Hawker, OBE, lately Financial Secretary, Zanzibar.
- Leslie James Herron, QC, Chief Justice, New South Wales.
- Arthur William Horner, TD, Director, Independence Celebrations, Kenya, 1963.
- Eifion Jones, OBE, Permanent Secretary, Ministry of Works, Northern Nigeria.
- John Armstrong Grice McCall, Administrative Officer (Staff Grade), Mid-Western Nigeria.
- Michael John Macoun, OBE, Inspector-General of Police, Uganda.
- Frank Stephen Miles, Acting British High Commissioner in Tanganyika.
- Lewis George Mitchell, Deputy Inspector-General of Police, Kenya.
- St. Elmo Dudley Nelson, Provincial Secretary, Kano, Northern Nigeria.
- Lancelot Vivian Pellew, President of the Industrial Court of South Australia.
- Brian Clieve Roberts, QC, Permanent Secretary, Ministry of Justice and Solicitor General, Nyasaland.
- Henry William Snell, JP, of Bendigo, Victoria. For public and political services.
- Hugh Selby Norman-Walker, OBE, Secretary to the Treasury, Nyasaland.
- Gerald Jackson Bryan, OBE, MC, Administrator, St Lucia.
- Paul Annersley Gore, CVO, Deputy Governor, Gambia.
- Geoffrey Colin Guy, OBE, Administrator, Turks and Caicos Islands.
- Edmund Brinsley Teesdale, MC, Colonial Secretary, Hong Kong.
- James William Vernon, Assistant Secretary, Colonial Office.
- Reginald Arthur Burrows, Counsellor and Consul-General, Her Majesty's Embassy, Saigon.
- Alan Hugh Campbell, Counsellor, United Kingdom Mission to the United Nations, New York.
- Arthur Antony Duff, DSO, DSC, Her Majesty's Ambassador Extraordinary and Plenipotentiary in Kathmandu.
- Samuel Falle, DSC, Foreign Office.
- Joseph George Hart, OBE, First Secretary, Her Majesty's Embassy, Rome.
- Alexander Lees Mayall, Counsellor, Her Majesty's Embassy, Lisbon.
- David Francis Muirhead, CVO, Foreign Office.
- The Honourable Peter Edward Ramsbotham, Counsellor, Her Majesty's Embassy, Paris.
- Charles Peter Scott, OBE, Head of the United Kingdom Permanent Mission to the European Office of the United Nations, Geneva.
- Edward Gervase Willan, Political Adviser to the Hong Kong Government.

=== Royal Victorian Order ===
==== Knight Commander of the Royal Victorian Order (KCVO) ====
- Major Reginald Narcissus Macdonald-Buchanan, CVO, MBE, MC.
- John Nigel Loring, CVO, MRCS, LRCP.
- Surgeon Vice-Admiral Derek Duncombe Steele-Perkins, CB, CVO.
- Ronald Bodley Scott, DM, FRCP.

==== Commander of the Royal Victorian Order (CVO) ====
- Lady Rose Gwendolen Louisa Baring.
- Robert Septimus Friar Edwards, CBE.
- Henry James Evans, OBE.
- Ralph Freeman, CBE.
- Dugald Malcolm, TD.

==== Member of the Royal Victorian Order, 4th class (MVO) ====
- Richard Allan Baker.
- Frank Collier.
- Surgeon Commander John Marsden Haughton, Royal Navy.
- Alice Anne Hawkins.
- Major Ian Kenneth Cockburn Hobkirk, MC.
- Gordon Stephen Knight.
- Major The Honourable Francis Michael Legh.
- Marguerite Olivia Rankin.
- Leslie Alfred John Treby, MVO, MBE, BEM.
- Lieutenant-Commander Ernest Richard Wheeler, MBE, Royal Navy (Retired).

==== Member of the Royal Victorian Order, 5th class (MVO) ====
- John Chisholm.
- Dorothy Magdalen Louise Collins.
- Gordon Harold Davis.
- Ambrose Francis Dowling, MBE, TD.
- Captain Reginald Arthur Eaton.
- Joseph Grant.
- Gilbert Valentine Locke.
- Jean Elizabeth Taylor.
- Harry Francis Woodland Travers.

=== Order of the British Empire ===
==== Knight Grand Cross of the Order of the British Empire (GBE) ====
Military Division

- Admiral Sir Royston Hollis Wright, KCB, DSC.

Civil Division

- Sir Arthur Frederic Brownlow Fforde, lately chairman, BBC.
- Alderman Clement James Harman, Lord Mayor, City of London.
- Sir George Peter Labouchère, KCMG, Her Majesty's Ambassador Extraordinary and Plenipotentiary in Madrid.

==== Knight Commander of the Order of the British Empire (KBE) ====
Military Division

Royal Navy

- Vice-Admiral Antony Bartholomew Cole, CB, DSC.
- Vice-Admiral George David Archibald Gregory, CB, DSO.

Army

- Major-General Robert Withers Ewbank, CB, CBE, DSO (38372), late Corps of Royal Engineers (now R.A.R.O.).
- Major-General Harold John Crossley Hildreth, CBE (39116), Colonel Commandant, Royal Army Ordnance Corps.

Civil Division

- Rex Arthur Louis Cohen, OBE, chairman, Board of Management, Navy, Army and Air Force Institutes.
- The Right Honourable Charles Garrett Ponsonby, Earl of Drogheda, OBE, chairman, Royal Opera House, Covent Garden Ltd.
- Richard Fredrick Roberts Dunbar, CB, OBE, Permanent Secretary, Ministry of Finance, Northern Ireland, and Head of the Northern Ireland Civil Service.
- Percy Faulkner, CB, Controller, HM Stationery Office.
- Frederick Herbert Gamble, CMG, Her Majesty's Ambassador Extraordinary and Plenipotentiary (designate) in La Paz.
- Keith Unwin, CMG, OBE, Minister, United Kingdom Mission to the United Nations, New York.
- Russell John Dumas, CMG. For public services in Western Australia.
- Arthur Hope-Jones, CMG. For public services, in Kenya.
- Robert Peter Fawcus, CMG, OBE, Her Majesty's Commissioner, Bechuanaland Protectorate.

==== Dame Commander of the Order of the British Empire (DBE) ====
Civil Division

- Eileen Louise Younghusband, CBE, JP. For public services in the field of social work.

==== Commander of the Order of the British Empire (CBE) ====
Military Division

Royal Navy

- Captain Alexander Robert Kennedy, OBE.
- Instructor Captain Victor Lamb.
- Colonel John Leeper Anketell Macafee, Royal Marines.
- Captain Ronald Percy Pratt, OBE.
- Captain Ian Andrew Bryant Quarrie, VRD, Royal Naval Reserve.
- Reverend Arthur Douglas Spear, OBE, QHC.
- Commodore Roland Chisnell Watkin.
- Captain John Gerard Wells, DSC.
- Joan Mary Woodgate, RRC, QHNS, Queen Alexandra's Royal Naval Nursing Service.

Army

- Colonel Anthony William Cowper, OBE (105244), late Infantry.
- Brigadier James Norris Drew, OBE (79289), late Corps of Royal Engineers.
- Colonel James Edward Golothan, ERD, TD, ADC (86371), Staff, Territorial Army.
- Colonel Hugh Gray Wybrants Hamilton, MBE (74555), late Corps of Royal Engineers.
- Brigadier Gilbert Simon Heathcote, MBE (56585), late Royal Regiment of Artillery.
- Brigadier Harold Robert Law Hodges, ADC (47549), late Royal Regiment of Artillery.
- Brigadier Denis Warburton Jackson, OBE (74678), late Infantry.
- Colonel Leonard Henry Lee, OBE (90951), late Royal Armoured Corps.
- Brigadier Fergus Alan Humphrey Ling, DSO (64575), late Infantry.
- Brigadier (temporary) James Doiran Lunt, OBE (73138), late Royal Armoured Corps.
- Brigadier Kenneth Rowland Swetenham Trevor, DSO, OBE (63586), late Infantry.
- Brigadier (now Major-General) Thomas Norman Samuel Wheeler, OBE (66180), late Infantry.
- Colonel George Widdowson, MBE, TD, ADC, JP (49397), late Corps of Royal Engineers, Army Emergency Reserve.
- Colonel Anthony Garnett Heywood, MVO, MC (129452), late Foot Guards; on loan to the Government of Malaysia.

Royal Air Force

- Air Commodore Frank Ernest Tyndall.
- Group Captain Peter Malam Brothers, DSO, DFC.
- Group Captain Ian Robert Campbell, AFC.
- Group Captain Adrian Peter Dart, DSO, DFC.
- Group Captain Beresford Peter Torrington Horsley, MVO, AFC.
- Group Captain Jack Norton Kentish, DFC.
- Group Captain Frederick Baden King, (Retired).
- Group Captain Ian Neil MacDougall, DFC.
- Group Captain Ronald Arthur Webster.
- Group Captain Tom Wharton.

Civil Division

- Angus Whiteford Acworth. For services to the Georgian Group.
- Peter Alexander, lately Regius Professor of English Language and Literature, University of Glasgow.
- David George Ogilvy Ayerst, Staff Inspector, Department of Education and Science.
- Alderman Henry Bedlington. For political and public services in Wallasey.
- Lady Elena Bennett, OBE. For political and public services in Tonbridge and London.
- Richard Raymond Bomford, DM, FRCP, Consultant Physician, London.
- Arthur Edward Bowles, MBE, Chief Officer, Lancashire Fire Brigade.
- The Right Honourable Mabel Helen, The Baroness Brecon, JP. For political and public services in Wales.
- Amy Frances Bull, Headmistress, Wallington County School for Girls, Surrey.
- Neville Cardus, Journalist and Writer.
- William Henry Newton Carter, Principal Inspector for Special Development Duties, Mines Inspectorate, Ministry of Power.
- Howard Montagu Colvin. For services to Architectural History.
- Hugh Graham Conway, Joint Managing Director, Short Brothers & Harland Ltd., Belfast.
- Ernest Thomas Conybeare, OBE, MD, FRCP, Principal Medical Officer, Ministry of Health.
- William Parry Cripps. For political and public services in Gloucestershire.
- David Maurice James Dear, OBE. For political services.
- Adrian Digby, Keeper of Ethnography, British Museum.
- Adelaide Baillieu Doughty. For political services in the South East.
- Alexander Robert Dunbar, OBE, Member, British Railways Board.
- Cecil Wood Flemming, OBE, MCh, FRCS, Dean of University College Hospital Medical School.
- Agneta Lina Foster. For political and public services in Nottinghamshire.
- John Gordon Loveband Francis, Controller, Finance, BBC.
- Anthony Joseph Gishford, Honorary Secretary, The Pilgrims of Great Britain.
- Kurt Mathias Hahn. For services to Youth.
- George Alexander Hannah, JP, managing director, Pegson Limited.
- Francis Albert James Harrison, chairman and Joint Managing Director, The Pyrene Company Limited.
- Alfred Trevor Haynes, President, Faculty of Actuaries.
- Colonel Walter Lancaster Hey, TD. For political services in Leeds.
- Frank Holland, Comptroller, London County Council.
- William Marshall Hurton, Director of Group Manufacturing Development for the English Electric Group of Companies.
- Henry Charles Husband, Senior Partner, Husband & Company, Consulting Engineers, Sheffield.
- Alec Arnold Constantine Issigonis, Technical Director, British Motor Corporation.
- Mabel Leonora Jackson, MBE, JP. For political and public services in Lancashire.
- Arthur James Soady James, Assistant Secretary, Ministry of Labour.
- Arthur Jones, Chief Farm Management Advisory Officer, Ministry of Agriculture, Fisheries and Food.
- John Gibson Kerr, Agent and Clerk of the Convention of Royal Burghs for Scotland.
- Stanislaw Kazimierz Kon, Deputy Chief Scientific Officer, National Institute for Research in Dairying, Shinfield, Berkshire.
- Dietrich Küchemann, Deputy Chief Scientific Officer, Ministry of Aviation.
- Professor Hubert Gibson Lamont, OBE, MRCVS, Chief Scientific Officer, Ministry of Agriculture for Northern Ireland.
- Austin Arthur Lemon Lane, Deputy Chief Engineer, Ministry of Housing and Local Government.
- William Milton Larke, General Manager, Stewarts & Lloyds Ltd., Bilston, Staffordshire. Chairman, Health and Safety Committee, British Employers' Confederation.
- Edward Bryan Latham, MM, lately a Forestry Commissioner.
- Leslie Frederick Warwick Lawrence, Deputy Chief Inspector, Board of Customs and Excise.
- Herbert Lea, chairman of the executive committee, National Institute of Agricultural Botany.
- Maurice Charles William Long, TD, MB, BS, Deputy Medical Adviser, HM Treasury and Chief Medical Adviser, Post Office.
- John Longwell, Deputy Government Chemist, Department of Scientific and Industrial Research.
- Colonel Stuart Maynard Lovell, OBE, TD, ERD, County Surveyor, County Council of the West Riding of Yorkshire.
- John Henry Loveridge, MBE, Attorney-General, Guernsey.
- Bernard Lyons, JP. For services to the Jewish Community in Leeds.
- John Arthur Mowbray Ellison-Macartney, TD, chairman, Board of Governors, St. John's Hospital for Diseases of the Skin.
- Benjamin Macarty, Director, Engineering Employers' Federation.
- James Ellis McComb, DFC, General Manager, Cwmbran Development Corporation.
- Edward Hyde Macintosh, chairman, Northern Regional Hospital Board, Inverness.
- Matthew Holmes Mackellar, OBE, Principal Executive Officer, Ministry of Pensions and National Insurance.
- Matthew James McRobert, Deputy Secretary, Arts Council of Great Britain.
- William Alexander Mactaggart, JP, chairman and managing director, Pringle of Scotland, Hawick.
- Alexander Meikle, Director and General Manager, Woolwich Equitable Building Society.
- Professor Alfred John Murphy, Principal, College of Aeronautics, Cranfield.
- John Northcote Nash, Artist.
- Albert Neuberger, MD, Professor of Chemical Pathology, St Mary's Hospital, University of London.
- Lewis Charles Nickolls, lately Director, Metropolitan Police Forensic Science Laboratory.
- James Bagot Oldham, VRD, FRCS, Consultant Surgeon, Liverpool.
- Edward Harold Palmer, Senior Partner, Gardiner & Theobald, Quantity Surveyors.
- Leslie Robert Palmer, Principal Director of Accounts, Ministry of Defence.
- Leslie Roy Phillips, OBE, Controller, Overseas Division A (Commonwealth), British Council.
- Lawrence Herbert Austin Pilkington, Director, Pilkington Brothers Ltd., St. Helens, Lancashire.
- Harold Powis, OBE. For political and public services in Middlesex and Essex.
- Harold Valentine Pugh, chairman, South Eastern Electricity Board.
- William Alfred Purdie, Senior Principal Inspector of Taxes, Board of Inland Revenue.
- Alderman Dorothy Mary Rees, JP, chairman, Technical Education Sub-Committee, Welsh Joint Education Committee.
- The Right Honourable Elinor Dorothea, The Viscountess Rochdale, JP. For political services in the North of England.
- Edward Noel Rowbotham, chairman, Ever Ready Company.
- Kenneth Sherriff Ryle, MC, Financial and Administrative Secretary, Church Commissioners.
- Lieutenant-Colonel Philip Sidney Sartain, Chief Architect and Director of Works, Home Office.
- William James Semmons, Deputy Chief Scientific Officer, Fighting Vehicles Research and Development Establishment, Ministry of Defence.
- Colonel Geoffrey Peter Shakerley, MC, TD, DL, Alderman and chairman, Gloucestershire County Council.
- Harry Archibald Shaw, Assistant Secretary, Ministry of Defence.
- Catherine Agnes Smaldon, chairman, General Nursing Council for England and Wales.
- Frederick Llewellyn Smith, managing director, Motor Car Division, Rolls-Royce.
- The Right Honourable Alastair, Baron Stratheden and Campbell, JP, DL, chairman, Edinburgh and East of Scotland College of Agriculture.
- Alderman Edwin Swale, OBE, DFC, Vice-chairman, General Purposes Committee of the Association of Municipal Corporations.
- Peter Edward Trench, OBE, TD, lately Director, National Federation of Building Trades Employers.
- Kenneth Ascough Usherwood, President, Institute of Actuaries.
- Robert Milnes Walker, MS, FRCS, Professor of Surgery, University of Bristol.
- Arthur Aaron Walter, Senior Official Receiver, Bankruptcy High Court, Board of Trade.
- Neil Watson, President of the Law Society of Scotland.
- Dorothy Whitelock, Elrington and Bosworth Professor of Anglo-Saxon, University of Cambridge.
- Bernard Ernest Willett, assistant director of Works, Ministry of Public Building and Works.
- Charles Henry Trelease Williams, JP, chairman, Park Gate Iron and Steel Company, Ltd.
- Albert William Wood, Assistant Secretary, Ministry of Transport.
- Walter Reginald Wooldridge, Scientific Director, Animal Health Trust.
- Edith Isabella Young, lately HM Chief Inspector of Schools, Scottish Education Department.
- Captain Joseph John Youngs, OBE, DSC, RD, Marine Superintendent, New Zealand Shipping Company, Ltd.
- Doris Marion Angell, MBE, Principal, Maddox Academy, Mexico.
- James David Christie, President of the British Chamber of Commerce in Uruguay.
- James Brian Cullen, Counsellor (Commercial), Her Majesty's Embassy, Washington.
- Leonard Cunliffe David, British subject resident in France.
- Violet Penelope Dickson, MBE, British subject resident in Kuwait.
- Malcolm Gale, MBE, Counsellor (Commercial), Her Majesty's Embassy, Washington.
- Hilary William King, MBE, Her Majesty's Ambassador Extraordinary and Plenipotentiary in Conakry.
- The Venerable Archdeacon Gwilym Alun Morris, Archdeacon of Eastern Arabia and the Persian Gulf.
- Arthur Solomon Wilson, British subject resident in Switzerland.
- Ian Hugh Aitken, Principal Immigration Officer, Kenya.
- Frank Eric Barfoot, Commissioner, British South Africa Police, Southern Rhodesia.
- James Stephen Bell, DFC, Commissioner of Police, Western Nigeria.
- Thomas Stewart Bell, lately Secretary, Federal Department of Transport, Salisbury, Southern Rhodesia.
- Dean Walter Berry, a prominent Architect in South Australia. For public services.
- James Robert Brown, Permanent Secretary, Ministry of Local Government and Social Welfare, Northern Rhodesia.
- Leonard William Henry Butts, OBE. For services to the law in Queensland.
- Arthur Edward Laurence Collins, managing director, Ashok Leyland, Ennore, Madras, India.
- Robert James Dewar, Chief Conservator of Forests, Nyasaland.
- Percy Alan Earnshaw, MB, CHM, of Clayfield, Queensland. For services to medicine.
- Thomas Geoffrey Edgar. For services to industry in New South Wales.
- William Peter Gaskell, MBE, formerly Chief Inspector of Mines, Nigeria.
- Frank Firth Gilboy, Deputy Permanent Secretary, Treasury, Kenya.
- John Gunn Drummond Gordon, Superintendent of East African Branches, National & Grindlays Bank, Kenya.
- Charles Hubert Harvie, formerly Chief Statistician, Department of Statistics, Malaysia.
- Robert Kirkwood, MBE, Regional Director, Posts and Telecommunications, Sabah.
- John Digby Leach, lately Commissioner of Main Roads, Western Australia.
- Arthur Edwin Lewis, Permanent Secretary, Ministry of Finance, Northern Rhodesia.
- Colonel Arthur Gordon Oldham, ED, of Melbourne, Victoria. For public services.
- Richard Neal Barlow-Poole, Permanent Secretary, Ministry of Land and Survey, Northern Nigeria.
- Stanley George Quinton, lately chairman, Federal Board of Customs and Excise, Nigeria.
- John William Rollison, MB, BS, Director-General of Medical Services, South Australia.
- Clifford Henry Coomer Searby, MB, FRCS, President of the Medical Board, Victoria.
- James Alfred Smith, TD, Senior Puisne Judge, Northern Nigeria.
- Stuart Robert Stephens. For services to the British community in Pakistan.
- Alexander Storrar, Director of Settlement, Kenya.
- Reginald Hugh Whittam, MBE, Commissioner of Internal Revenue, Ministry of Finance, Eastern Nigeria.
- John Wilson, JP, Manager, Chartered Bank, Singapore.
- Charles Walter Frederick Bethell. For public services in the Bahamas.
- Edgar Ronald Childe, JP. For public services in Hong Kong.
- Gilbert Alexander Cooper, ED. For public services in Bermuda.
- Arthur Dignan Leys, OBE, JP. For public services in Fiji.
- Maurice Charles Salles-Miquelle, OBE. For public services in St Lucia.
- Dhun Jehangir Ruttonjee, OBE, JP. For public services in Hong Kong.
- Walter Power Stanford, DFC, President of the National Council, Basutoland.
- Louis Francis Valantine, MBE, JP, Chairman of Public Service Commission, Gambia.

==== Officer of the Order of the British Empire (OBE) ====
Military Division

Royal Navy

- Commander Bruce John Bevis Andrew, DSC.
- Commander John Archibald Bedford.
- Commander Stephen Fernihough Ward Brown.
- Surgeon-Commander (D) Eric Brian Campbell Cliff, FDS, RCS.
- Commander Ronald Alfred Cluett.
- Commander Richard Lessingham Edmonds.
- Instructor Commander Frederic Alan Gaydon, VRD, Royal Naval Reserve.
- Commander David William Haslam.
- Mr. John Edward Kennedy, Royal Fleet Auxiliary Service.
- Reverend James Laidlaw.
- Commander Ronald George Paish, DSC.
- Instructor Commander Edward Reid.
- Commander Barnaby Frederick Palmer Samborne.
- Lieutenant Colonel Terence Morton Patrick Stevens, Royal Marines.
- Commander William Rennie Stewart, Royal Naval Reserve.
- Commander Bruce Michael Tobey.

Army

- Lieutenant-Colonel Michael John Andrews, MBE (278748), Corps of Royal Engineers.
- Lieutenant-Colonel Arthur Axford, MBE (258705), The Manchester Regiment, Territorial Army.
- Lieutenant-Colonel William Bate (337000), Royal Army Service Corps.
- Lieutenant-Colonel (now Colonel (temporary)) Logan Scott-Bowden, DSO, MC (95182), Corps of Royal Engineers.
- Lieutenant-Colonel John Richard Bradshaw, TD (323384), Corps of Royal Electrical and Mechanical Engineers, Territorial Army.
- Lieutenant-Colonel (Quartermaster) David Gordon Carnegie Butchart (297551), The Black Watch (Royal Highland Regiment).
- Lieutenant-Colonel John Harold Greenway Brighton, MBE, MC (180533), The Royal Northumberland Fusiliers.
- Lieutenant-Colonel (acting) John Howard Derbyshire (223933), Combined Cadet Force.
- Colonel (acting) Geoffrey Edmund Fitzhugh, TD (28372), Army Cadet Force.
- Lieutenant-Colonel (now Colonel) Alexander Grieve, MB (173447), late Royal Army Medical Corps.
- Lieutenant-Colonel Vivian Henry Spencer Hannay, MC (125185), Corps of Royal Engineers.
- Lieutenant-Colonel George Edward Howells (231122), Royal Army Medical Corps.
- Lieutenant-Colonel (now Colonel) Hugh Eustace Lang, TD (352432), late Royal Corps of Signals, Territorial Army.
- Lieutenant-Colonel Edwin George Lee (189094), The Parachute Regiment, The Parachute Corps, Territorial Army.
- Brevet and Temporary Lieutenant-Colonel Robert Lyon, MBE (288788), Royal Regiment of Artillery.
- Lieutenant-Colonel Michael William McCorkell TD (334894), North Irish Horse, Royal Armoured Corps, Territorial Army.
- Lieutenant-Colonel Giles Hallam Mills (207511), 2nd Green Jackets, The King's Royal Rifle Corps.
- Lieutenant-Colonel (District Officer) James Roland Redding, MBE (167447), Royal Regiment of Artillery (Employed List 2X).
- Lieutenant-Colonel John Downie Richards (255150), Royal Army Pay Corps.
- Lieutenant-Colonel Michael Ryan (124347), The Royal Warwickshire Fusiliers.
- Lieutenant-Colonel Stuart Arthur Smith, MBE (156183), The Royal Leicestershire Regiment.
- Lieutenant-Colonel William Bruce Standbridge (380925), 6th Queen Elizabeth's Own Gurkha Rifles.
- Lieutenant-Colonel Kenneth Mark Stuckey, MBE (114097), The Staffordshire Regiment (The Prince of Wales's).
- Lieutenant-Colonel Douglas Stanley Templeton (273575), Corps of Royal Electrical and Mechanical Engineers.
- Lieutenant-Colonel Ernest Anthony Tremlett, MBE (78922), Royal Regiment of Artillery.
- Lieutenant-Colonel David John Warren, DSO, MC (72686), The Royal Hampshire Regiment
- Lieutenant-Colonel Thomas Warren Whittaker (70980), The Royal Welch Fusiliers (Employed List 1).
- Lieutenant-Colonel James Donaldson Wilson, TD (70803), Royal Regiment of Artillery, Territorial Army.
- Lieutenant-Colonel Thomas Paul John Lewis, lately Commanding Officer, 1st Battalion, The King's African Rifles, Nyasaland.
- Lieutenant-Colonel Frederick George Milligan (1545), Commanding Officer, 7th Battalion, The Royal Rhodesia Regiment, Northern Rhodesia.
- Lieutenant-Colonel John Pilkington (260495), Royal Army Pay Corps; on loan to the Government of the Federal Republic of Nigeria.
- Lieutenant-Colonel Celco Lima de Freitas, Officer Commanding, The British Guiana Volunteer Force.

Royal Air Force

- Group Captain Valentine Harold Hemming, MBE.
- Group Captain Harold James Pringle, MBE, Royal Rhodesian Air Force.
- Wing Commander Stewart Baillie (186102).
- Wing Commander Douglas Henry Mervyn Chandler (55473).
- Wing Commander James Charles Ellis (156496).
- Wing Commander Leslie Bernard Foskett, AFC (150047).
- Wing Commander Arthur Murland Gill, DFC (84709).
- Wing Commander Charles Sidney Vincent Goodwin, Royal Rhodesian Air Force.
- Wing Commander Leonard John Jenkins (49452).
- Wing Commander Arthur Charles Langdon (124932).
- Wing Commander George Frederick Edmund Loveridge (46186), (Retired).
- Wing Commander John Danford de Sales McElwain (86028).
- Wing Commander Alan John Donald Maclachlan, DFC (41797).
- Wing Commander Colin Murray (31288).
- Wing Commander Leslie George Press, AFC (117153).
- Wing Commander George Robson (130187).
- Wing Commander Wilfred Charles Taylor (49413).
- Wing Commander Frederick Percival Walker, AFC (59499).
- Wing Commander George Young (52671).
- Acting Wing Commander John Lacey Ireland (138819), Royal Air Force Volunteer Reserve (Training Branch).
- Acting Wing Commander Hugh Kitchen (167397).
- Squadron Leader James Lewis Alfred Bailey (53302).

Civil Division

- Robert Joseph Allan, chief executive officer, Ministry of Defence.
- John Archbold, chairman, National Schools Advisory Savings Committee.
- Colin Victor Armitage, FDSRCS, LDSRCS, JP. For political and public services in Stockton-on-Tees.
- John Benfield Scriven Attwooll, Principal Inspector of Taxes, Board of Inland Revenue.
- John Stewart Auchinvole, Principal, Board of Trade.
- Harry Vivian Barter, JP, Director, Industrial Association of Wales and Monmouthshire.
- Dorothy Maud Bates, MBE, JP, chairman, Leicester No. 3 Hospital Management Committee.
- George James Logan Batters, Conservator of Forests, North East England, Forestry Commission.
- Alderman Tom Baynham. For public services in the West Riding of Yorkshire.
- Lieutenant-Colonel Alfred Thomas John Beard, MBE, ERD, Telephone Manager, Nottingham, General Post Office.
- Alec Victor Bedser. For services to Cricket.
- John Cardean Bell, MC, chairman, Board of Management for Edinburgh Northern Hospitals.
- John Clewley Bills, Deputy Chief Lands Officer, Ministry of Defence.
- Eric Alexander Balfour Birse, Chief Chemical Inspector, Scottish Development Department.
- David Blacktop, Chief Officer, Staffordshire Fire Brigade.
- Walter Edward Blair, Senior Secretary in charge of Young Men's Christian Association services to HM Forces in Southern England.
- Gerald Robert Boak, General Secretary, The Royal Air Forces Association.
- Frank John Edward Bools, District Probate Registrar, Wakefield.
- Charles Lester Booth, HM District Inspector of Mines and Quarries, West Midland and Southern Division, Ministry of Power.
- William Douglas Bradshaw, Development Manager, Industrial Rubber Products, Goodyear Tyre & Rubber Company, Ltd., Wolverhampton.
- Alfred Joseph Brayshaw, General Secretary, National Marriage Guidance Council.
- Julian Alexander Bream, Guitarist and Lutanist.
- Cicely Mary Brunt, HM Inspector of Schools, Department of Education and Science.
- Arthur Rowland Bryant, Senior Superintendent, Atomic Weapons Research Establishment, Aldermaston. United Kingdom Atomic Energy Authority.
- Ronald John Burrage, Manager, John F. Kennedy Airport, New York (Western Routes), British Overseas Airways Corporation.
- Ronald Richard Butler, Principal, Ministry of Finance for Northern Ireland.
- Geoffrey George Buttolph, Senior Engineer, Crown Agents for Oversea Governments and Administrations.
- Ernestine Marie Carter, Editor, Women's Pages, Sunday Times.
- Edward William Chapman, Manager, South Coast Ports of National Dock Labour Board (Southampton, Poole and Weymouth.)
- William Stephen Chapman, Superintending Quantity Surveyor, Ministry of Public Building and Works.
- John Douglas Chick, First Class Valuer, Board of Inland Revenue.
- James Clark. For services to Motor Racing.
- Eric Charles Claxton, MBE, Chairman of the council, Casualties Union. For services to Civil Defence.
- Charles Clayton. For services to the Judicial Committee of the Privy Council.
- Edgar Sunderland Clayton, MD, FRCS, General Practitioner, Whitchurch, Shropshire.
- Waldo John Clements, chairman, No's. 1438 and 1982 Squadrons, Joint Welfare Committee, Air Training Corps.
- Hugh Anthony Lewis Cockerell, Secretary, Chartered Insurance Institute.
- Eric George Coggins, Secretary, National Skating Association of Great Britain.
- Henry Michael Collins, Secretary, Council for Technical Education and Training for Overseas Countries, Department of Technical Co-operation.
- Charles Henry Arnold Collyns, Manager, Edinburgh and Borders Area, South of Scotland Electricity Board.
- Denis David Condon, Counsellor, British High Commission, Lagos, Nigeria.
- Kathleen Mabel Davies-Cooke. For services to the Girl Guides Association.
- John Cowan, Assistant Accountant-General, Ministry of Aviation.
- Dorothy Olga Cowell, Island Director, Isle of Man Central Council Branch, British Red Cross Society.
- Edward Walker Craig, Scottish Divisional Officer, Union of Shop, Distributive and Allied Workers.
- Herbert Walter Crampin, lately chairman, Grimsby Fishing Vessels Owners' Association.
- Martha Agnes Crow, Regional Administrator, Eastern Region, Women's Voluntary Service.
- Alderman Horace Walter Cutler. For political and public services in Middlesex.
- Leslie Reece Norton David, lately Higher Collector, Board of Customs and Excise.
- Lieutenant-Colonel Bernard Laurence John Davy, TD. For political services in Cornwall.
- Norman Davy, MM, Honorary Consultant to the Underwater Division of the Weapons Department, Ministry of Defence.
- Edward George Dean, Technical Information Officer, Ministry of Public Building and Works.
- Reginald Percy Dickinson, Senior Principal Scientific Officer, Ministry of Aviation.
- John James Dingwall, Chief Constable, Angus Constabulary.
- William Pooley Dodgson, Chief Livestock Husbandry Officer, Ministry of Agriculture, Fisheries and Food.
- Eric Charles Drewe, Head of Equipment Department, British Broadcasting Corporation.
- Harold Leslie Drewitt, Chairman of the council, Royal Agricultural Benevolent Institution.
- Norman Drinkwater, TD, Principal Investigator, Royal Commission on Historical Monuments (England).
- Edward John William Durrant, Senior Chief Executive Officer, Home Office.
- Charles Henry George Eburne, MBE, Staff Controller External Telecommunications Executive, General Post Office.
- Lady Freda Eddy, MBE, Member, West Midlands Regional Savings Committee.
- Edward Morgan Edwards, deputy chairman, Wales Gas Board.
- Captain John Ivor Edwards, Master, SS Naess Texas, J&J Denholm.
- James Sturgess Elliott, MBE, Attached, Ministry of Defence.
- Lucian Randolph Ercolani, chairman and Joint Managing Director, Furniture Industries Ltd., High Wycombe.
- Edwin Evans, Principal, Board of Trade.
- John Worthington Eyres, chief executive officer, HM Stationery Office.
- Morgan Fairest, chairman, Morgan Fairest Ltd., Sheffield.
- Levi Fox. For services in connection with the Shakespeare Anniversary Celebrations.
- Irene Grace Gairdner. Honorary Secretary, British Epilepsy Association.
- Hugh Gallagher, JP, chairman, National Insurance Local Tribunal for Coatbridge.
- Sydney Gampell, Financial Editor, Reuters.
- Margaret Morrison George, Headmistress, Dawson Park (Special) School, Falkirk, Stirlingshire.
- Cyril George Giles, Senior Principal Scientific Officer, Department of Scientific and Industrial Research.
- John Vernon Stuart Glass. For political services in Runcorn.
- Reginald Rowland Cleave, JP, Director, General Manager and Editor-in-Chief, Southern Newspapers Ltd.
- John Goatly, Regional Representative, British Council, Bombay, India.
- John Ernest Pettit Griffith, Controller, Pensions Office, Ministry of Defence.
- Alderman Maude Lyle Griffith, JP. For public services in Essex.
- Joseph William Grove, chairman, Bedfordshire and Hertfordshire Advisory Committee.
- Florence Caroline Mary Hackett, MBE, Member representing South East Hampshire, National Savings Assembly.
- John Hall, Chief Secretary, Royal Society for the Prevention of Cruelty to Animals.
- David Henry Halley, Secretary and Solicitor, Scottish Special Housing Association Ltd.
- Frederick Robin Hamp, Senior Legal Assistant, Ministry of Agriculture, Fisheries and Food.
- Ronald Ward Harker, Adviser, Military Aircraft, Rolls-Royce Ltd.
- Richard Hayward, JP, Author and Ulster Folklore Expert.
- Joseph Herbert, Alderman, Burnley County Borough.
- Joan Henrietta Curzon-Howe-Herrick. For political services in Thirsk and Malton.
- William Jayne Hodges, DL, Employer member, West Wales District Advisory Committee, Welsh Board for Industry.
- Cyril Hope, Head of Mathematics Department, City of Worcester Training College.
- John Hurst, Senior Chief Executive Officer, National Savings Committee.
- Malcolm Innes, Senior Chief Executive Officer, Ministry of Pensions and National Insurance.
- Frederick Otho Isaac, deputy director of Inspection of Stores and Clothing, Ministry of Defence.
- Noel David Glaves James, MC, TD, lately President, Royal Forestry Society of England, Wales and Northern Ireland.
- Frederick William Jones, chief executive officer, Ministry of Pensions and National Insurance.
- Rees Ogwyn Jones, Senior Principal Scientific Officer, Department of Scientific and Industrial Research.
- Edward Albert Kelly, Finance Manager, HM Dockyard, Chatham, Ministry of Defence.
- Lewis Edward Kent, Partner in the firm of Andrews, Kent & Stone, Consulting Civil and Structural Engineers.
- Brian Lorraine King, Principal Liaison Officer, Government Sales, Ford.
- Edward Charles Lacey, Overseas Manager, Malcolm Clubs, Royal Air Force.
- Kenneth Rivers Lack, Superintending Architect, Ministry of Public Building and Works.
- Isaac Henry Lamb, chairman, Cambridgeshire Agricultural Executive Committee.
- George William Lilburn, Secretary, Royal National Institute for the Deaf.
- Lady Edith Christian Broun Lindsay. For public services in East Lothian.
- Fenwick Lishman, MB, BS, General Practitioner, Durham.
- Henry Davies Llewellyn, MRCS, LRCP, JP. For social and cultural activities in Llanelly, Carmarthenshire.
- John Weighill Lodge, MC, JP, chairman, Mid-Cornwall Disablement Advisory Committee.
- Marjorie Watton Lonsdale, Headmistress, Trinity Hall School, Southport.
- Michael Lorimer, Secretary, Scottish Landowners' Federation.
- John Frederick Lovell, JP, chairman and Joint Managing Director, G. F. Lovell & Company Ltd., Newport, Monmouthshire.
- Trevor Lovett, Headmaster, Holyhead County Secondary School.
- Eric James Lowe, deputy director of Audit, Exchequer and Audit Department
- James Lyons, FDS, RCS.Ed, Member, Northern Ireland General Health Services Board.
- David Alexander McClelland, JP. For political and public services in Belfast
- Ivor Anderson MacDougall, MBE, MRCS, LRCP, County Medical Officer of Health, Hampshire.
- Group-Captain John McFarlane, MC, AFC, chairman, Great Yarmouth, Lowestoft and District War Pensions Committee.
- John Eric Miers Macgregor. For services to the Society for the Protection of Ancient Buildings.
- Georgina Russell Davidson MacKinnon, chairman, The Drambuie Liqueur Company, Ltd., Edinburgh.
- Ross Scott McLaren, DSO, MBE, TD, DL, Production Director, Durham Division, National Coal Board.
- The Reverend William MacNicol, DD, Formerly Minister of the Parish of Longforgan, Dundee.
- Alderman Isita Clare Mansel. For political and public services in London.
- Thomas Edwin Marsh, Chief Engineer, Bibby Line Ltd.
- Hugh Marshall. For services to Music in Scotland.
- Thomas Nelson Marsham, Superintendent (Reactors), Production Group, Windscale and Calder Works, United Kingdom Atomic Energy Authority.
- Jack Henry Mewett, Head of Films, Television, British Broadcasting Corporation.
- Squadron-Leader George Jenkin Morgan, Vice-chairman, Territorial and Auxiliary Forces Association for the County of Carmarthen.
- Leslie Giles Morgan, Grade II Officer, Ministry of Labour.
- James Denis Mounfield, Principal, National College of Food Technology.
- Donald Murray, JP. For political and public services in the Western Isles.
- Maurice Nockles, chief executive officer, Board of Customs and Excise.
- Michael John Noone, managing director, Whessoe Ltd., Darlington.
- Lieutenant-Colonel Sampson Buckthought Hooton Oliver, TD. For political services.
- William Joseph Harry Pascoe, General Manager and Secretary, Royal London Society for the Blind.
- Rex Munro Paterson, Farmer, Hampshire.
- Frederick William Charles Pennington, Commander, Metropolitan Police.
- Frank Knibbs White-Phillips, Mayor of Caernarvon.
- Thomas Raymond Pick, chairman, Deeping Fen, Spalding and Pinchbeck Internal Drainage Board.
- Cornelia Julia Polar, MBE, Head of Treaty and Nationality Department, Foreign Office.
- Laurence Stevenson Porter, Principal, Agricultural Research Council.
- John Llewellyn Powell, Deputy Treasury Valuer, Rating of Government Property Department.
- Cyril Winthrop Mackworth-Praed, Honorary Associate of the British Museum (Natural History).
- John Henry Rathbone, Deputy Education Officer, Manchester.
- Lewis Reeve, Chief Metallurgist, Appleby-Frodingham Steel Company, Scunthorpe.
- Alexander Stewart Reid, Principal Scientific Officer, Ministry of Defence. ,
- William Joseph Riddoch, Member, Forestry Commission Regional Advisory Committee for the East (Scotland) Conservancy.
- James Robinson. For political services in County Londonderry.
- Joseph Clark Robinson, MBE, Member representing Westmorland, National Savings Assembly.
- Thomas Neil Rose, LDS, General Dental Practitioner, Airdrie.
- John Kenneth Sinclair St. Joseph. For services to Archaeology.
- Kenneth Albert Barber Sampson, Director, Sea Transport Division, Ministry of Transport
- Robert James Scott, Senior Inspector (General Duties), Department of Agriculture and Fisheries for Scotland.
- Robert Thomas Hunter Scott, MBE, Secretary, Trustee Savings Banks Association.
- Gertrude Fanny Seely, JP. For public services in Nottingham.
- Harold John Gibbon Shearsmith, Assistant Regional Director (Administration), Ministry of Public Building and Works.
- William Ewart Sidnell, Principal Architect, Ministry of Health.
- Reginald John Langham Slater. For public services in East Ham.
- James Easton Smail, chief executive officer, Ministry of Pensions and National Insurance.
- Florence May Small Wood. For political and public services in Birmingham.
- Richard Ernest Spain, managing director, John M. Henderson & Company, Ltd., Aberdeen.
- Leslie John Symons Spry, assistant director of Stores, Ministry of Defence.
- Marjorie Steel, General Secretary, Institute of Almoners.
- Irene Mary Olivia Steggall, chief executive officer, Foreign Office.
- John Doric Stewart. For services to the Boy Scouts Association.
- Thomas Clements Stewart. For political and public services in London and Middlesex.
- James Henry Stretton. For political and public services in Nottinghamshire.
- Arthur Henry Sully. For services as Director, British Steel Castings Research Association.
- Charles Joseph Sweeney, MBE, Chief Superintendent, Plans Branch, Land Registry.
- Charles Keith Tallack, County Surveyor, Lincolnshire (Lindsey) County Council.
- Alderman Charles Frederick Tebbutt, JP. For public services in Huntingdonshire.
- Alderman William Sumner Temple, chairman, East Riding of Yorkshire Executive Council.
- Alexander Key Terris, Chief Civil Engineer, Eastern Region, British Railways Board.
- Lieutenant-Colonel Henry John Thompson, TD. For political services in Bassetlaw.
- Douglas Philip Thres, Principal, Ministry, of Transport.
- Ernest Tindall. For political and public services in Sheffield.
- Lieutenant-Colonel Gerald William Treadwell. For political services in Kent.
- Ernest Brian Trubshaw, MVO, Chief Test Pilot, British Aircraft Corporation.
- Archibald Veitch, TD. For political and public services in Berwickshire.
- Percy Vernon, Chief Examiner, Board of Inland Revenue.
- Donald Hubert Wain, General Manager, Telephone Division, Standard Telephones and Cables Ltd.
- Eric Noel Wakelin, Chief Public Health Inspector, Birmingham Corporation.
- Richard William Waldie, LDS, RCS, General Dental Practitioner, Richmond, Yorkshire.
- Jean Christie Walker, Grade II Officer, Ministry of Labour.
- Richard Wilbraham Walker, Chief Constable, Eastbourne Borough Police.
- Robert James Walker, MBE, County Inspector, Royal Ulster Constabulary.
- James Edward Wallace, Chorus Master, Royal Liverpool Philharmonic Society.
- Alderman Herbert Robert Waller, MBE, JP, DL. For public services in Bedfordshire.
- Captain Christopher Arnold Waters, Master, SS Serenia, Shell Tankers Ltd.
- George Waterston, Scottish Representative, Royal Society for the Protection of Birds.
- Francis Wills Watson, MC, JP, chairman, Housing Committee, Belfast Corporation.
- Nora Isabel Wattie, MB, ChB, Principal Medical Officer for Maternity and Child Welfare, Glasgow Corporation.
- Cecil Stanley Whitehead, JP. For social services, in particular for youth in Kent.
- Bryan Hugh Williams, lately Clerk of the Cardiff Rural District Council.
- Emlyn Williams, Regional Scientific Adviser, London Civil Defence Region.
- Wynford Thomas Williams, Secretary, Society of Motor Manufacturers & Traders, Ltd.
- Harold Winder, MBE, chairman, Dewsbury, Batley and District War Pensions Committee.
- Francis Norman Withers, Principal, Department of Education and Science.
- George Ernest Wright, chief executive officer, Board of Customs and Excise.
- Jack Pennington Wykes, Manager, Maritime Division, The Marconi Company, Chelmsford, Essex.
- Keith Henry Wyser, Legal Adviser to the National Federation of Housing Societies.
- Alec David Young, Professor of Aeronautical Engineering, Queen Mary College, University of London.
- Frank Reginald Arnott, Esq., British subject resident in the Argentine Republic.
- Harry Bentley, Esq., British Consul, Cartagena.
- James Matthew Carlin Esq., D.F.C., First Secretary (Labour), Her Majesty's Embassies, Buenos Aires, Asuncion, Montevideo and Santiago.
- John Hounslow Donofield, Esq., British subject lately resident in Thailand.
- Edmund Patrick Donovan, Esq., British subject resident in the United States of America.
- Alfred Mario Fluhmann, Esq., M.B.E., Her Majesty's Consul, Basle.
- The Reverend William Alfred Franklin, Chaplain, St. Andrew's Church, Santiago.
- William Reginald Fryer, Esq., lately British Trade Correspondent, Port Elizabeth.
- Charles William Fyfield, Esq., British Council Representative, Algeria.
- John Edgar Halliday, Esq., British subject resident in Mexico.
- Reginald Henry James Hamlin, Esq., M.B.. Ch.B., Obstetrician and Gynaecologist, Princess Tahai Memorial Hospital, Addis Ababa.
- Keith Reginald Welbore Ker, Esq., Her Majesty's Consul-General, Hanover.
- William Reid McAlpine, Esq., British Council Representative, Burma.
- Robert Antony Newbery, Esq., British subject resident in Turkey.
- Stanley Herbert Pull, Esq., British subject resident in Indonesia.
- Allen Ashard Webb, Esq., President, British Chamber of Commerce for Belgium and Luxembourg.
- Idris Herbert Williams, Esq., Cultural Attache, Her Majesty's Embassy, Cairo.
- Milton Pentonville Allen, Esq., Speaker of the Legislative Council, St. Christopher Nevis Anguilla.
- The Right Reverend Leonard Alufurai. For public services in the Western Pacific.
- Paul Gustave Arthur Anthony, Esq. For public services in Mauritius.
- James Robert Bruce, Esq., Resident Magistrate, Ascension Island.
- Edgar Cochrane, Esq., M.D., Ch.B., Senior Medical Officer of Health, Barbados.
- Miss Sidney Elizabeth Croskery, M.D., Ch.B. For public services in Aden.
- The Reverend James Davison, chairman, British Guiana District, Methodist Church.
- Wilbur Edgar Donovan, Esq., I.S.O. For public services in Fiji.
- Silvio Casimir Bettencourt-Gomes, Esq., M.B., Ch.B., Senior Physician, St. Joseph's Mercy Hospital, British Guiana.
- William Alfred Hoare, Esq., M.B.E., Government Printer, British Honduras.
- Charles John Hunter, Esq., Director of Education, Bechuanaland Protectorate.
- Rawle Shilstone Jordan, Esq., Chief Education Officer, Barbados.
- Kenneth John Winton Lane, Esq., M.V.O., Secretary to the Prime Minister and Cabinet, Gambia.
- Eric Vernon Lawson, Esq. For public services in the Western Pacific.
- Joseph Le Roy, Esq., Electoral Commissioner. Mauritius.
- Ellen, Mrs. Li Tsao Sau-Kwan, M.B.E., J.P. For public services in Hong Kong.
- Alexander James Smith McFadzean, Esq., M.D., F.R.C.P., Professor of Medicine, University of Hong Kong.
- Edward Parr Wilmot-Morgan, Esq., assistant director of Public Works, Hong Kong.
- Martin Pounder, Esq., Chief Industrial Officer, Bahamas.
- Thomas Egbert Noble Smith, Esq., J.P. For public services in Grenada.
- Edmund Harold Stuart, Esq., Member of Civil Service Commission, Bahamas.
- Fred Gainford Taharally, Esq., Commissioner of Labour, Ministry of Labour, Health and Housing, British Guiana.
- Patrick Charles Temple, Esq., Commissioner of Police, Swaziland.
- Alan Tregarthen Trenerry, Esq. For public services in Hong Kong.
- Goingsamy Venkatasamy, Esq., Principal Assistant Secretary, Mauritius.
- Eric Wood, Esq., Port Officer, Aden Port Trust.
- Charles Metam Yeats, Esq. For public services in Basutoland.

==== Member of the Order of the British Empire (MBE) ====
Military Division

Royal Navy

- Lieutenant-Commander (C.C.F.) Richard Oswell Illtyd Borradaile, Royal Naval Reserve.
- Lieutenant-Commander (S.D.) (G) Stanley Howard Boulton.
- Lieutenant-Commander Arthur Connelly Brooks, Royal Navy (Retd).
- Lieutenant-Commander Patrick Richard Compton-Hall.
- Lieutenant-Commander (S.D.) (O) Geoffrey George Gibbs.
- Lieutenant Gordon Douglas Hotchkiss.
- Lieutenant-Commander Sidney Jones, BEM.
- Engineer Lieutenant-Commander Herbert Henry Lacey.
- Engineer Lieutenant Thomas Wallace Lamport.
- Lieutenant-Commander Frederick Stanley Martin.
- Lieutenant-Commander Henry Stern.
- Electrical Lieutenant-Commander (S.L.) Peter Reginald Malyon Waldram.
- Surgeon Lieutenant-Commander Frank Roger Wilkes, MB, ChB.
- Supply Lieutenant-Commander Edward Henry Willmott.
- Instructor Lieutenant-Commander William Muir Wren.

Army

- Major The Honourable William David Arbuthnott (393058), The Black Watch (Royal Highland Regiment).
- Major (temporary) Attan bin Yatim, BEM (428255), Royal Army Service Corps.
- Captain William Baxter (366776), Royal Army Service Corps (Employed List 4).
- Lieutenant Charles George Baddock Brodley (461386), Corps of Royal Engineers.
- Major Zbigniew Marceli Brzezicki (204675), General List.
- Major Stanley Arthur William Bush (402418), Corps of Royal Military Police, Territorial Army (now T.A.R.O.).
- Captain (Quartermaster) Robert Callaby, MM (451852), The Duke of Wellington's Regiment (West Riding).
- Captain (acting) Frederick William Edward Clark (374099), Army Cadet Force.
- 22530397 Warrant Officer Class II Sidney George Cooper, DCM, Queen's Royal Rifles, Territorial Army.
- Lieutenant Hedley George Higman Croft (474773), General List.
- Major David Lambert Paxton Danger, MM (353491), Royal Army Ordnance Corps.
- 22536570 Warrant Officer Class II James Edward Dolbear, Royal Regiment of Artillery, Territorial Army.
- Captain (Quartermaster) (local Major) (Recruiting Officer) James Montgomery Ferguson (137698) (Retired).
- Captain (Quartermaster) Henry Flowers, MM (456544), Royal Regiment of Artillery.
- 19033012 Warrant Officer Class II Michael Mitchell-Gears, Corps of Royal Engineers.
- Major James Malcolm Glover (403465), 3rd Green Jackets, The Rifle Brigade.
- 868118 Warrant Officer Class I (acting) Frank Arthur Hamilton, Corps of Royal Electrical and Mechanical Engineers.
- Major Colin Stanley Harvey, TD (320597), Royal Regiment of Artillery, Territorial Army.
- 6282719 Warrant Officer Class II Edward George Harwood, The Buffs (Royal East Kent Regiment), Territorial Army.
- Major (Honorary Lieutenant-Colonel) Arthur Gilbert Hill, DCM (131140), (Retired). Quartermaster, Royal Hospital, Chelsea.
- 22270729 Warrant Officer Class II Edward Hubert Hughes, Corps of Royal Electrical and Mechanical Engineers, Territorial Army.
- Major (temporary) Frederick Hunn (362173), Royal Armoured Corps.
- T/194491 Warrant Officer Class II Robert Arthur Jameson, Royal Army Service Corps.
- Major (Technical Instructor in Gunnery) Alfred Leslie Johnson (421310), Royal Regiment of Artillery.
- Major Ian Cranmer Lambie (362020), Royal Regiment of Artillery.
- Major Leonid Lieven (323849), General List (now retired).
- Major (now Lieutenant-Colonel (temporary)) Roderick Stuart Mackenzie, MC (229063), Royal Regiment of Artillery.
- Major Andrew Patrick Withy Magellan (335162), Coldstream Guards.
- Captain (Quartermaster) Spencer Norman Mason (470514), Royal Regiment of Artillery.
- Major Arthur Carl Mawby (418333), Royal Army Service Corps.
- Major David Malet Mayfield, TD (96821), The Parachute Regiment, The Parachute Corps (now retired).
- 23780531 Warrant Officer Class II John McConville, Army Catering Corps, Territorial Army.
- Captain (Quartermaster) Henry McDortch (451804), The King's Regiment (Manchester and Liverpool).
- 25231072 Warrant Officer Class II Peter Lamb McGhie, The Cameronians (Scottish Rifles), Territorial Amy.
- Major (acting) John McGreeghan (374029), Army Cadet Force.
- Major Thomas Hill Melson (360537), Royal Army Service Corps, Territorial Army (now T.A.R.O.)
- Major (now Lieutenant-Colonel (temporary)) Betty Margaret Metcalfe (257050), Women's Royal Army Corps.
- 6086852 Warrant Officer Class I George Eric Mileham, The Queen's Royal Surrey Regiment.
- 5883806 Warrant Officer Class II George Kent Miller, Royal Army Pay Corps.
- Major (acting) Stanley Simpson Mitchell, TD (399539), Combined Cadet Force.
- Captain (Quartermaster) Basil Arnold Neale (442673), Royal Army Service Corps.
- Major (acting) Eurof Lloyd Osmend (272848), Combined Cadet Force.
- Major Basil Pomeroy Pryer (200941), Royal Regiment of Artillery.
- Captain Joan Elizabeth Quarrie (440602), Women's Royal Army Corps, Territorial Army.
- Major Peter Niel Ralli Stewart-Richardson (330881), Coldstream Guards.
- Captain David Beatty Robinson (337590), Corps of Royal Engineers.
- Major Norman Horace Sidney John Smith (447007), Corps of Royal Engineers, Territorial Army.
- 22294711 Warrant Officer Class I (Bandmaster) William Smith, The Border Regiment, Territorial Army.
- Major William Victor Glanville Smith, MC (203736), The Lancashire Fusiliers.
- Major Alan Sydney Stepto (385320), Army Air Corps.
- Captain (Quartermaster) Albert Frank Stubbs (461783), Royal Corps of Signals.
- 14185951 Warrant Officer Class II Ernest Summers, Royal Corps of Signals.
- Major Philip Thornton (305887), Royal Army Educational Corps (now retired).
- Major Frank Austin Tucker (261371), Corps of Royal Engineers.
- LS/3770435 Warrant Officer Class I Henry Francis Wattleworth, The King's Regiment (Manchester and Liverpool).
- Major Reginald Frederick Wilkes (307442), Royal Army Ordnance Corps.
- Warrant Officer Class I Stanly Arthur Daynes, 2nd Battalion, The Royal Rhodesia Regiment, Southern Rhodesia.
- Major Richard Martin Holman (346140), 1st East Anglian Regiment (Royal Norfolk and Suffolk); formerly on loan to the Government of the Federal Republic of Nigeria.
- 14409061 Warrant Officer Class II Angus James Macdonald, The Parachute Regiment, The Parachute Corps; serving with the British Joint Services Training Team, Ghana.
- Captain Robert Marsh (423760), Royal Corps of Signals; on loan to the Government of Malaysia.
- Major Alan David Peckham (337753), The Queen's Own Buffs, The Royal Kent Regiment; on loan to the Government of Malaysia.
- Captain (Quartermaster) John Daniel Pretorius, The Royal Rhodesia Regiment, Southern Rhodesia.
- Major Michael James Charles Hugh Sanders (95487), The Devonshire and Dorset Regiment, formerly on loan to the Government of Nigeria.
- Captain Vincent Bennett Browne, Commanding Officer, Montserrat Defence Force.
- Major Lawrence Gordon Quintyne, ED, Company Commander, The Barbados Regiment.

Royal Air Force

- Squadron Leader Edgar Martyn Allies, DFC (77375).
- Squadron Leader Laurence Milton Bailey (59804).
- Squadron Leader Harold Baxter (3039587).
- Squadron Leader George Hickmott (155954).
- Squadron Leader Ernest Hudson (501268).
- Squadron Leader Paul Kent (1806443).
- Squadron Leader Kenneth Graham Lee (180285).
- Squadron Leader James MacDonald, DFC (54631).
- Squadron Leader Robert Henry McCaughran (52968).
- Squadron Leader Edward Vernon Mellor (607092).
- Squadron Leader Richard Edmond Morris (59100).
- Squadron Leader Edwin Leonard Nieass (180621).
- Squadron Leader Barry Arthur Phillips (607038).
- Squadron Leader William Carrington Rees (52976).
- Squadron Leader Kenneth Ruskell, DFC (131595).
- Squadron Leader Darrol Stinton (2605313).
- Squadron Leader Gordon Harold Syson (161506).
- Squadron Leader Donald Wood (182249).
- Acting Squadron Leader Ernest Bairstow (55571).
- Acting Squadron Leader Leslie Baron (144716), Royal Air Force Volunteer Reserve (Training Branch).
- Flight Lieutenant James Michael Brown, MB, BChir (506770).
- Flight Lieutenant John Macmillan Macaulay (627435).
- Flight Lieutenant Alfred Parker (1281233), Royal Air Force Regiment.
- Flight Lieutenant Donald Kenneth Gordon Ross (3511823), (now Royal Air Force Reserve of Officers).
- Flight Lieutenant Ivor Button (577326).
- Flight Lieutenant Gordon Lester Torpy (3510552).
- Flight Lieutenant Bertie James Wilken, MB, ChB (506781), (Retired).
- Flight Lieutenant Harold Wrathall (938104).
- Flight Officer Peggy Gillian Dale (7832), Women's Royal Auxiliary Air Force.
- Acting Flight Lieutenant John Frost (69792), Royal Air Force Volunteer Reserve (Training Branch).
- Warrant Officer Herbert Briggs (564515).
- Warrant Officer George Edmund Brockerton (560520).
- Warrant Officer Dennis Byrnes (954460).
- Warrant Officer Cyril John Darling (1405812).
- Warrant Officer George Robert Dunn (517640).
- Warrant Officer Maurice Francis Moore Flynn, BEM (771529).
- Warrant Officer Frank Edward Johnstone (1238947).
- Warrant Officer Eynon Herbert Ladd (518217).
- Warrant Officer Ronald Wilson Liversage (611784).
- Warrant Officer Henry John Marsh (538452).
- Warrant Officer John Morrison, BEM (1566342).
- Warrant Officer Sidney John Philbrick (566468).
- Warrant Officer George Henderson Price (547496).
- Warrant Officer Graham William Gilbert White-Winchester (537943).
- Warrant Officer John Samuel Wood (590649).

Civil Division

- Elizabeth Adams, Executive Officer, Ministry of Pensions and National Insurance.
- William Alexander Adamson, Superintendent, Gibraltar Security Police, Ministry of Defence.
- Winifred Alice Alford, Clerical Officer Secretary, Department of Education and Science.
- Wilfred Leslie Allen, Higher Executive Officer, Ministry of Housing and Local Government.
- Henry Samuel Alsford. For political services.
- Hubert Harry Anderson, Senior Executive Officer, Ministry of Pensions and National Insurance.
- Dorothy Ashworth. For political services in Blackburn.
- Edward Melville Aspinall, Superintendent, Stockport County Borough Police.
- Eugenie Louisa Gladys Babbage, Clerical Officer Secretary, Ministry of Defence.
- Frank Henry Bailey, JP, Senior Executive Officer, Board of Trade.
- Harry Lionel Bailey, Divisional Highway Surveyor, Northamptonshire County Council.
- Elsie Mary Baker, Grade III Officer, Foreign Office.
- Winifred Orr Kelway-Bamber. For political and public services in Ayrshire.
- James Thorpe Banister, Higher Executive Officer, Ministry of Pensions and National Insurance.
- James William Banks, chairman, West Bromwich, Smethwick and District War Pensions Committee.
- Clementina Mair Barclay. For political and public services in Glasgow.
- Fred Bates, chairman, Barnsley District Committee, West Riding of Yorkshire Agricultural Executive Committee.
- Marjory Grace Belcher. For political and public services in Surrey.
- Frank Bell, Inspector of Taxes (Higher Grade), Board of Inland Revenue.
- Lilian Bennies, Executive Officer, Ministry of Agriculture, Fisheries and Food.
- Donald Cameron Bickerton, Production Controller, Drysdale and Company, Ltd., Glasgow.
- Observer Commander Thomas Harry Birch, Commandant, No. 2 Group, Royal Observer Corps.
- Phyllis May Blair, Secretary to the Chief Constable of Portsmouth.
- John Wilson Blame, Mechanical Engineer, Technical Works (Grade B), Forestry Commission, Scotland.
- Joseph Westwood Booth, Senior Vocational Training Officer, Prison Department, Home Office.
- Katherine Boughton, Chief Superintendent of Typists, Home Office.
- Sidney George Bowman, Technical Works Engineer, Grade I, Government Communications Headquarters, Foreign Office.
- Leslie George Bridgman, Assistant Chief Officer, Kent Fire Brigade.
- Irene Emily Brooker, Clerical Officer Secretary, Department of Scientific and Industrial Research.
- Gordon Watson Brown, Assistant Chief Constable, Northumberland.
- Hubert Irvine Brown, County Welfare Officer for County Fermanagh.
- Kathleen Mary Bull, Assistant Secretary, Corby Development Corporation, Northamptonshire.
- Bertha Bullock, Probation Officer, Leeds.
- Beryl Burton. For services to Cycling.
- Harry Buzzard, Works Superintendent, Sydney Smith & Sons (Nottingham) Ltd.
- Harold Ernest Byfield, Headmaster, Downend Church of England Junior School, Gloucestershire.
- Brenda Gladys Calderwood, Principal Youth Employment Officer, City and County of Newcastle-upon-Tyne.
- James Craig Cameron, MB, BCh. For political services in Chigwell.
- Lieutenant-Colonel Ernest Walter Cannings, MC, Assistant Secretary, Territorial and Auxiliary Forces Association for the County of Cornwall.
- John Oliver Carnegie, Area Manager, Boston, National Assistance Board.
- Alfred James Castle, MM, BEM, lately Superintendent, War Department Constabulary, War Office.
- William Yates Caunce, chairman, Thurrock Disablement Advisory Committee.
- Robert George Chapman, Senior Executive Officer, Ministry of Defence.
- Freda Church, Higher Executive Officer, Ministry of Defence.
- Edward Thomas Clark, Member representing Oxfordshire, National Savings Assembly.
- George Henry Clark, Personal Assistant to the Service Manager, de Havilland Division, Hawker Siddeley Aviation Ltd., Hatfield.
- Florence Margaret Clarke, Clerical Officer Secretary, Export Credits Guarantee Department.
- Madge Myra Claxton, English Language Officer, Ghana, British Council.
- Norman Albert Bowen Clements, Area Works Officer, Egypt Area, Commonwealth War Graves Commission.
- Frederick St. Clair Cobb, North East Essex Constituency Representative, Regional Schools Advisory Savings Committee.
- James Codd, Group Leader, Atomic Energy Establishment, Winfrith, United Kingdom Atomic Energy Authority.
- Thomas Edward Cogswell, Commandant, Metropolitan Special Constabulary.
- Frank Marshall Collins. For voluntary public services in Bushey, Hertfordshire.
- James Collins. For political and public services in Paddington.
- Frederick Vincent Commander, Factory Manager, Joseph Lucas (Gas Turbine Equipment) Ltd.
- Geoffrey Hewett Cooper, Technical Grade A, Ministry of Public Building and Works.
- Alfred James Gee Coulshed, Central Rescue Stations Manager, East Midlands Division, National Coal Board.
- George Edward Cousins, Senior Experimental Officer, HM Establishment, Loch Goil, Ministry of Defence.
- Captain Herbert William Crabtree, Master, MV Kirkham Abbey, Associated Humber Lines Ltd., Transport Holding Company.
- George James Creech, Assistant Commissioner and County Secretary, Bristol, St. John Ambulance Brigade.
- Alderman Henry John Crocker, Member, Nottinghamshire Agricultural Executive Committee.
- Olive Crossley, Superintendent Midwife, City General Hospital, Sheffield.
- Enid Mary Cubitt, Secretary and Treasurer, Women's Voluntary Service Trustees Ltd.
- Arthur Henry Coverdale Cussons, chairman, Eastern District Committee, North Riding of Yorkshire Agricultural Executive Committee.
- Eric Cuthbert, lately Welding Engineer, Harland & Wolff Ltd., Belfast.
- Doris May Darby, District Nurse/Midwife, Staffordshire County Council.
- Barbara Annie Bineham Davies, Controller of Typists, Board of Inland Revenue.
- Edith Victoria Winifred Deakin, One-in-Five Organiser, Southern Region, Women's Voluntary Service.
- Alfred George Demain, ERD, JP, Higher Executive Officer, Ministry of Pensions and National Insurance.
- James William Dickinson, Esq. For services to Association Football.
- Ronald William Dobbing, Chief Officer, East Ham Fire Brigade.
- Thomas Driscoll, Head Pharmacist, Medical Department (Naval), Ministry of Defence.
- William Duff, Higher Executive Officer, Office of the Civil Air Attaché in the Middle East, Beirut.
- Alderman James Dougal Duncan, JP, Principal Deputy Area Controller, Civil Defence Corps, Somerset.
- Laurence Montague Easton, Member, Sittingbourne and Milton Urban District Council.
- William George Edward, chairman, Inverurie Burgh Savings Committee.
- James Joseph Edwards, Higher Executive Officer, Ministry of Defence.
- Donald Henry Elliott, Senior Telecommunications Engineer, Cable & Wireless
- Oliver Ellis, Member, Civil Defence Committee, Bootle.
- Joseph Emens, Superintendent, Head Post Office, Newcastle-upon-Tyne.
- Harold David Evans, Grade IV Officer, Ministry of Labour.
- Howell Jones Evans, Dairy Farmer, Cheshire.
- William Ralph Evans, Director and Chief Engineer, Shelton Iron & Steel Ltd.
- Reginald Spear Every, Indoor Officer, Board of Customs and Excise.
- William Scott Fairholm, BEM, Civil Defence Officer, Ross and Cromarty County Council.
- Josephine Ann Farrow, lately Clerical Officer, London Communications Electronic Security Agency, Foreign Office.
- Emily Freda Filmer, Assistant Supervisor of Duplicator Operators, Ministry of Public Building and Works.
- Cecil Herbert Percy Fish. For services to the British Legion in Norfolk.
- Frank Fitton, JP, chairman, Ashton-under-Lyne, Dukinfield and District Employment Committee.
- Jack Alexander George Fitzgerald, Chief Engineer, Control Gear Division, Laurence Scott & Electromotors, Ltd., Norwich.
- John Leopold Fletcher, Assistant Manager (Engineering) Submarines, Cammell Laird & Company, Ltd., Birkenhead.
- Alexander Forbes, Senior Executive Officer, Ministry of Health.
- James Forrest, Grade III Officer, Ministry of Labour.
- Norah Mabel Foster, Executive Officer, Ministry of Transport.
- Henry Alfred Franklin, Grade III Officer, Ministry of Labour.
- Frederick Leslie Gatfield, Group Secretary, Norwich, Lowestoft and Great Yarmouth Hospital Management Committee.
- Evan Howard George, Head of department, Dockyard Technical College, Portsmouth, Ministry of Defence.
- William Frederick George, managing director, Celluware Ltd., Gateshead.
- Observer Officer Albert Goodworth, Group Officer, No. 18 Group, Royal Observer Corps.
- Clifford Goodyear, JP. For services to Boys' Clubs in Yorkshire.
- Marion Gosset, Head of Library and Information Services, Atomic Energy Research Establishment, Harwell, United Kingdom Atomic Energy Authority.
- Harold Gough, Secretary, County Londonderry Savings Committee.
- Ernest Goulding, lately Senior Executive Officer, Ministry of Pensions and National Insurance.
- Dorothy Violet Gower, Grade III Officer, Ministry of Labour.
- Gladys Minnie Gower, Executive Officer, Commonwealth Relations Office.
- Bernard Gordon Grant, lately Clerical Officer, Royal Army Service Corps, Gosport, War Office.
- Elizabeth Morgan Grieve. For political services in South Angus.
- Robert Hewitt-Hack, deputy director, Hall of Residence for Commonwealth Students, British Council.
- Margaret Elizabeth Hall, Head Almoner, Royal Victoria Hospital, Belfast.
- John Edward Hargreaves, Northern Editor, Farmers' Weekly.
- Ian Harkness, JP, Shipyard Manager, Lithgows Ltd., Port Glasgow.
- Florence Elsie Harris, Clerical Officer, Ministry of Defence.
- Alfred Thomas Harrison, Superintendent of Parks, Edinburgh.
- Eric Harrison, Senior Executive Officer, Scotland, General Post Office.
- John Harston, Operations Officer, Grade I, Ministry of Aviation.
- Dorothie Muriel Hepburn Hartwell. For political and public services in Eton and Slough.
- Agnes Mary Harvey, Honorary Secretary, Brighton Savings Committee.
- Guy Medley Harvey, chairman and Founder, Nantwich Boys' Club.
- Dorothy Hastings, Senior Executive Officer, Ministry of Agriculture, Fisheries and Food.
- Mabel Edith Haworth, chairman, Durham County Federation of Women's Institutes.
- Mary Hay. For political and public services in Oswestry.
- Samuel Edward Joseph Haysom, Chief Examiner of Technical Accounts, Ship Department, Ministry of Defence.
- Cyril James Heather, Senior Executive Officer, Crown Estate Office.
- Florence Margaret Henson. For political and public services in Leicestershire.
- Joan Elizabeth Parry Hickman, Chief Herbarium Clerk and Senior Indexer, Commonwealth Mycological Institute, Kew.
- Ronald Thomas Charles Higgins, Higher Executive Officer, Ministry of Pensions and National Insurance.
- Guy Hicham, Chief Vehicle Examiner, Northern Traffic Area, Ministry of Transport.
- Robert Edwin Spencer Hinchcliffe, Deputy Editor, Radio Newsreel, British Broadcasting Corporation.
- Arthur Edward Thomas Frederick Elisha Hiscox, Area Production Manager, No. 6 (Monmouthshire) Area, South Western Division, National Coal Board.
- Joseph Arthur Hitchmough, Higher Clerical Officer, Telephone Manager's Office, Manchester, General Post Office.
- Phyllis Mary Hobson, Grade II, National Agricultural Advisory Service (Bacteriologist), Ministry of Agriculture, Fisheries and Food.
- Thomas Frederick Hogg, Deputy Chief Officer, Monmouthshire Fire Brigade.
- Edith Holdsworth, County Borough Organiser, Wakefield, Women's Voluntary Service.
- Ernest Alexander Hornsby, Clerk and Superintendent, London Central Markets (Smithfield).
- Clare Annie Howard, Matron, Royal Hospital and Home for Incurables, Putney.
- Jean Mary Howat, Senior Adviser on Hospital Domestic Management, Ministry of Health.
- Kenneth Charles Ransome Howell, Supervising Examiner, Driving Tests, Ministry of Transport
- Emrys Hughes, Member, Llangefni Urban District Council.
- William Morrison Hunter, Superintendent and Deputy Chief. Constable, Paisley Burgh Police.
- Percy Ingleby, JP. For political and public services in Batley and Morley.
- Alfred George Gwyn Isaacs, Employer Chairman, Chesterfield District Advisory Committee, North Midland Regional Board for Industry.
- Captain Aubrey Francis Jackman, Honorary Director of the Bath Tattoo.
- Miriam James, Ward Sister, Swansea Hospital.
- John Thomas Jelley, Inspector of Works (Buildings) Technical I, Ministry of Public Building and Works.
- Fanny Anita Johns, lately Matron, Blackwood House, Redruth, Cornwall.
- Lieutenant-Commander Francis Nelson Blois Johnson, RD, chairman, Newhaven and Seaford Unit Committee, Sea Cadet Corps.
- Jessie Cowper Rooke Johnston. For political services in Gloucestershire.
- Robert Jenkin Jones, chairman, Ammanford Disablement Advisory Committee.
- Winifred Mary Kidd, Inspector of Taxes (Higher Grade), Board of Inland Revenue.
- Laura Killey, chairman, Ebbw Vale Street Groups Savings Sub-Committee.
- Edith Florence Mary King, Head of Ealing Hotel and Catering School, Ealing Technical College.
- Joan Mary Kirby, Higher Executive Officer, Ministry of Agriculture, Fisheries and Food.
- Charles Stephen Kirkup, Official of the Eastern Counties Area, Amalgamated Society of Painters and Decorators.
- Ernest Kirman, JP, lately Member, Grimsby Hospital Management Committee.
- Robert Stanley Lang, Honorary Secretary, Letchworth Division, Soldiers' Sailors' and Airmen's Families Association.
- Mary Margaret Langlois. For political services in Islington.
- William East Lear, Senior Experimental Officer, Food Science and Plant Health Division, Ministry of Agriculture, Fisheries and Food.
- Captain John William Lease, Master, MV Salvada, C Salvesen & Company.
- John Leiper, MD, ChB. For medical services to the Fishing Industry in Aberdeen.
- Norman George Lethlean, Research Engineer, North of Scotland Hydro-Electric Board.
- John Letters, chairman and managing director, John Letters & Company, Glasgow.
- Tord Alvar Quan Lidell, Senior Announcer (Sound), British Broadcasting Corporation.
- Elsie Lidgey. For public services in the Camborne–Redruth area, Cornwall.
- Edward Griffith Lloyd, Executive Engineer, General Post Office Headquarters, Northern Ireland.
- Geoffrey Roger Lock, Building Supervisor, Mowlem (Building) Ltd.
- Morrison Love, Pharmacist, Scottish Home and Health Department.
- Charles Lovell, Secretary, Royal Gloucestershire Hussars Old Comrades Association.
- Anna Margaret Jane Asher Lowe, Executive Officer, National Assistance Board.
- James McAleese, JP. For political services in Belfast.
- Gladys Alexandra MacBain, Higher Executive Officer, Ministry of Power.
- Donald Harry McCracken, Head of Engineering Department, Norwich City College and Art School.
- Evelyn Mary Macdonald, Principal, Dorset House School of Occupational Therapy.
- Agnes Jessie McIntyre, Clerk Superintendent of Typists, Scottish Home and Health Department.
- John Mackay, Provost of Invergordon.
- William McKay, Meteorological Officer, Seychelles, Ministry of Defence.
- Rothes MacLeod, Matron, Methil Haven Home, Methilhill, Fife.
- Marion Paterson Macmillan, BEM, Woman District Inspector, Royal Ulster Constabulary.
- Hugh MacPhee, Gaelic Producer, Scotland, British Broadcasting Corporation.
- Dorothea Mary Patricia Malley, Higher Executive Officer, Lord Chancellor's Department.
- Paul Rosario Joseph Maria Dominici Manduca, Local Assistant Accounts Officer, HM Naval Base, Malta GC.
- Kathleen Amy Manger, lately Organising Secretary, Not Forgotten Association.
- Ernest Vivian Riley Martin, Technical Class Grade I, Radio Design Staff, Ministry of Defence.
- Ernest Rowland Mason. For services to young people in Birmingham.
- William Frederick Mason, Secretary, National Coal Board Division Savings Committee.
- Dorothy Florence Maudslay. For political and public services in Yeovil.
- Doris Elsie Mears, Grade 3 Officer, Ministry of Labour.
- William Percival Melhuish, Correspondent to the Managers of two Approved Schools in Devon.
- Henry Edward Melsom, Higher Executive Officer, Board of Trade.
- Kathleen Mendelssohn. For political services in South West Hertfordshire.
- Commander Francis Duppa-Miller, Royal Navy (Retired), Civil Defence Adviser, Courtaulds Ltd., Coventry.
- Stanley Mitchell, Headmaster, Blurton County Junior School, Stoke-on-Trent.
- William John Mitchell, Head Postmaster, Richmond and Twickenham, General Post Office.
- Reginald Cottle Moody, Senior Information Officer, Ministry of Defence.
- Bertram Henry Moore, Area Engineer, Telephone Manager's Office, General Post Office.
- Samuel Moore, Deputy Principal, Ministry of Agriculture for Northern Ireland.
- Edgar Moorhouse, Examiner, Official Receiver's Office, Bradford, Board of Trade.
- Ernest Harold George Moreton. For political and public services in Herefordshire.
- Emrys Thomas Morgan, chairman, North West Regional Schools Advisory Savings Committee.
- Barbara Joyce Morris, Higher Executive Officer, Ministry of Defence.
- Christina Florence Mortimer, Higher Executive Officer, Board of Inland Revenue.
- Leonard Harvey Mumford, BEM, Superintendent of Dining Rooms, House of Commons.
- James Scott Gray Munro, TD, JP, DL, County Secretary, County of Aberdeen Branch, British Red Cross Society.
- Gladys Janet Murray, Secretary, Perth City and County, Women's Voluntary Service.
- Robert Colin Napier, lately Senior Executive Officer, War Office.
- George Maxwell Nelson, JP, Crofter. For services to agriculture in Scotland.
- Richard James Newman New All, Dredging Superintendent, Barrow Docks.
- William Kenneth Newson, Engineering Recruitment Officer, British Broadcasting Corporation.
- Alfred Nicholson, Assistant Shipyard Manager, Vickers-Armstrongs (Shipbuilders) Ltd., Barrow-in-Furness.
- Stanley Harold Niemeyer, Office Manager, The English-Speaking Union of the Commonwealth.
- Captain Fernleigh Rupert Nuttall. For services to the British Legion in the Metropolitan area.
- Thomas James William O'Hara, Higher Executive Officer, Ministry of Pensions and National Insurance.
- Thomas Oldham, Senior Collector of Taxes, Board of Inland Revenue.
- George Alfred Lansdowne Parfitt, Chief Clerk, Liverpool County Court and District Registry of the High Court of Justice.
- John Arnold Parker, Inspector of Air Raid Warnings, Eastern Sector.
- Jean Parkinson, Honorary Secretary, Newcastle, County Down, Savings Committee.
- Allan Edward Parritt, General Contracts Manager, Foxboro-Yoxall Ltd.
- Jack Boyt Parry, Group Secretary and Supplies Officer, Morgannwg Hospital Management Committee.
- Albert Henry Pearson, Director, Bramber Engineering Company, Ltd.
- Maxy Francis Thomas Perch, Chief Steward, Canberra, P&O.
- Edward John Perry, Clerical Officer, Ministry of Public Building and Works.
- William Joseph Peters, Chief Draughtsman, Armaments Division, Hawker Siddeley Dynamics, Coventry.
- Grace Maud Pheby, Chairman of General Purposes Committee, Southern Railwaymen's Home for Children, Woking, British Railways Board.
- Ernest John William Pickett, Principal Executive Assistant, London Transport Board.
- John Edward Pitson, lately Technical Officer, HM Stationery Office.
- Shackleton Pollard, lately Organist, Halifax Parish Church, West Riding of Yorkshire.
- John Stanley Pond. For services to the Boy Scouts Association in Essex.
- Mabel Lightwood Porter, JP, Joint County Borough Organiser, Stoke-on-Trent, Women's Voluntary Service.
- Ethel Fanny Louisa Pouncy, vice-president, South Dorset Branch, Association of Wrens.
- Ronald Murray Primett, lately chairman, Bedfordshire National Assistance Appeal Tribunal.
- Ethel Jane Pritchard, Assistant Secretary, Caernarvonshire Education Committee.
- Agnes Wood Raeside, Assistant Matron, Royal Maternity Hospital, Glasgow.
- Alfred Henry James Rand, Assistant Information Officer, Central Office of Information.
- Florence Annie Victoria Rawlings, lately Higher Clerical Officer, Office of HM Procurator-General and Treasury Solicitor.
- George Norman Hancock Read, District Officer, HM Coastguard, Hartland, Ministry of Transport.
- Philip Stanley Rendall, County Commandant, Warwickshire Special Constabulary.
- Walter George Richer, Superintendent, Mechanical Engineering Section, Bexford Ltd.
- William Bruce George Rigg, Chief Public Health Inspector and Cleansing Superintendent, Kendal Municipal Borough.
- Molly Ripley, Honorary Secretary, Scarborough and District Street Groups Savings Sub-Committee.
- Evan Roberts, Chief Warden, Nature Conservancy's National Nature Reserves in North Wales.
- Thomas Snowdon Robson, Senior Engineer, Transmitters, Independent Television Authority.
- Frank Anderson Rogers, Secretary, No. 2247 (Flint) Squadron Committee, Air Training Corps.
- Joseph Charles Roper, lately Clerk of Coseley Urban District Council.
- Sidney Walter Rose. For the provision of homes for old people in Banstead and district, Surrey.
- Marguerite Gladwyn Davidson Ross, President of the Central Committee, Women's Section, British Legion, Guernsey.
- George Rough, Senior Plant Health Inspector, Ministry of Agriculture, Fisheries and Food.
- Eric Sidney Russell, Chief Telecommunications Superintendent, External Telecommunications Executive, General Post Office.
- Arthur Henry Salway, Senior District Officer, Housing Department, London County Council.
- Elsie Lydia Sanders, Honorary Secretary, All England Netball Association.
- Joseph Patrick Savage, Staff Officer, Ministry of Commerce for Northern Ireland.
- Frederick Charles Sawyer, Senior Experimental Officer, British Museum (Natural History).
- Nicholas Paul Scott, JP. For political and public services.
- Constance Catherine Seaman, Grade V Officer, Foreign Office.
- Robert Maurice Shand, Station Master, Glasgow Central, British Railways Board.
- Winifred Alured Shand, Organiser in the Outer Hebrides for Highland Home Industries Ltd.
- Ernest Henry Sharp, Higher Executive Officer, National Gas Turbine Establishment, Farnborough, Ministry of Aviation.
- Horace Albert Barnabas Sheppard, Officer Board of Customs and Excise.
- Nora Adair Silver, Divisional Director, Woodbridge Division, Suffolk Branch, British Red Cross Society.
- Bert Kesterton Simmons, Technical Grade B, Southern Region, Ministry of Public Building and Works.
- Kenneth Sinclair, Senior Experimental Officer, Ministry of Defence.
- Winifred Skidmore, Welfare Officer, Grade I, Ministry of Defence.
- Stefan Slabczynski, Chief Restorer, Tate Gallery.
- John David Seaman Sloper, Operational Training Superintendent (Flight Operations), British Overseas Airways Corporation.
- William Emmanuel Sly, Senior Grade Surveyor, Ordnance Survey, Ministry of Agriculture, Fisheries and Food.
- Catherine Harvie Smith, Member, Argyll, Renfrew and Bute War Pensions Committee.
- James Alexander Smith, Senior Ship Surveyor, Marine Survey Office, Newcastle, Ministry of Transport
- John Gall Smith, lately Group Engineer (Civil), Nobel Division, Imperial Chemical Industries
- Leonard Gordon Smith, Senior Executive Officer, Commonwealth Relations Office.
- Ralph Oscar Smith, Leader and Secretary, Employers' Side, Milk Distributive Wages Council (England and Wales).
- Reginald Edward Valentine Smith. For political services in Weston-super-Mare.
- Sydney John Smith, Higher Executive Officer, Ministry of Defence.
- William Frederick Henry Smith, Assistant Labour Relations Officer, North Thames Gas Board.
- Dudley Francis Snelgrove, lately Senior Research Assistant, British Museum.
- Geoffrey Tate Stanley, formerly Airport Commandant III, Dalcross Aerodrome, now Air Traffic Control Officer, Accra Airport, Ministry of Aviation.
- Victor Stansfield, Chief Photographer, Rothamsted Experimental Station, Harpenden, Hertfordshire.
- Sidney Staples, Journalist. Reporter, Darlington & Stockton Times.
- Iris Edith Stephens, Member, Newport Urban District Council, Shropshire.
- Charles Frederick Stewart, Secretary of the Civil Service Club.
- Sheila Fairbairn Stewart, attached Ministry of Defence.
- Arthur Leslie Stickland, County Secretary, Staffordshire, National Farmers' Union.
- Edward Arthur Stokes, Chief Research Engineer, Yokes Ltd., Guildford.
- Maud Erinvine Stuart, Honorary Secretary, Disabled Soldiers Embroidery Industry. Friends of the Poor & Gentlefolk's Help.
- Helen Crum Sutherland, Chairman of Visiting Committee of Greenock Borstal for Girls.
- Marion Sutherland, Higher Executive Officer, Department of Agriculture and Fisheries for Scotland.
- James Colville Swanson, chairman, Grangemouth Unit Committee, Sea Cadet Corps.
- Isabella Somerville Swanston, Lady Superintendent and assistant teacher of English and History, Inverness High School.
- Arthur Herbert Sweet, Chief Preventive Officer, Board of Customs and Excise.
- Frederick Charles Talbert, lately Purser, SS Empress of Britain, Canadian Pacific Steamships.
- Montague Gervase Talbot, Works Technical Grade B, Ministry of Public Building and Works.
- William Ernest Charles Taylor. For political services in Ealing.
- Aelison Inglis Tennent, Member, Stirlingshire Local Savings Committee.
- Grace Susan Terras, Higher Executive Officer, Ministry of Aviation.
- Jane Ethelwyn Thomas, lately Nursing Officer to the Welsh Hospital Board.
- Margaret Elizabeth Thomas, Grade III Officer, Ministry of Labour.
- Wing-Commander Richard Maelor Thomas, chairman, Bath, Wells and District War Pensions Committee.
- Frederick Charles Thornton, lately Production Superintendent, AEC.
- Clara Mary Thubrun. For political and public services in Hendon.
- Kathleen Mary Thwaites, JP. For political and public services in Bury.
- Reginald Ernest William Tipton, executive director (Export), Gascoignes (Reading) Ltd.
- Eric John Tranter, TD. For political services.
- Madge Turner. For political services in Blyth.
- Thomas Arthur Tweddle, Headmaster, Central Boys' School, Darlington.
- Rowena Adelaide Vining, Senior Information Officer, Commonwealth Relations Office.
- Joan Vissian, Labour Manager, Royal Ordnance Factory, Burghfield, Ministry of Aviation.
- Walter Walker, Chief Ambulance Officer, Shropshire County Council.
- William James Walter, chairman, Ealing, Acton, Uxbridge and District War Pensions Committee.
- Edith Adelaide Webster, Headmistress, Beaconsfield Road Junior Mixed School, Southall.
- Margaret Clark Milne Webster, assistant director, Relief Purchasing, Stores and Supply Department, British Red Cross Society.
- Cyril William John Welham, Executive Officer, Registry of Friendly Societies.
- Robert Beamish Wellwood, Clerical Officer, Ministry of Public Building and Works.
- Captain Walter Douglas Wellwood, lately Senior Captain, British Overseas Airways Corporation.
- William Edwin Wheeler, Senior Experimental Officer, Rocket Propulsion Establishment, Westcott, Ministry of Aviation.
- Eric Stanley White, Chief Metallurgist, T. M. Birkett, Billington & Newton Ltd., Hanley, Stoke-on-Trent.
- Samuel White, Assistant Secretary, Ulster Farmers' Union.
- Gordon Henry Whitefield, Higher Executive Officer, Colonial Office.
- Elsie Wightman, Secretary, Newcastle University Institute Board for Examinations in Training Colleges.
- Sidney Wightman, Clerical Officer, Department of Education and Science.
- Captain Anthony Douglas Wilkinson, MC. For political services.
- Arthur Denby Wilkinson, Manager National Poultry Tests, Milford.
- Herbert John Williams. For political services in Yorkshire.
- Isabella Jane Williams, lately Staff Officer, Ministry of Labour and National Insurance for Northern Ireland.
- John Williams, Executive Officer, Exchequer Office, Edinburgh.
- William Noel Williams, Member representing Flintshire, National Savings Assembly.
- Margaret Scott Wilson. For political and public services in Ayrshire.
- Alderman Percy George Wood, chairman, Eastbourne Local Employment Committee.
- John Martin Woodruff, Deputy Armament Supply Officer, Plymouth, Ministry of Defence.
- David William Woods, managing director, Belfast Tool & Gauge Company, Belfast.
- Leonard Philip Wright, Divisional Officer, London Fire Brigade.
- Theodora Lina Wright, Clerical Assistant, Ministry of Power.
- Wilton Holroyd Young, Principal Survey Officer, Directorate of Overseas Surveys, Department of Technical Co-operation.
- Frank Reginald Arnott, British subject resident in the Argentine Republic.
- Harry Bentley, British Consul, Cartagena.
- James Matthew Carlin, DFC, First Secretary (Labour), Her Majesty's Embassies, Buenos Aires, Asuncion, Montevideo and Santiago.
- John Hounslow Donofield, British subject lately resident in Thailand.
- Edmund Patrick Donovan, British subject resident in the United States of America.
- Alfred Mario Fluhmann, MBE, Her Majesty's Consul, Basel.
- The Reverend William Alfred Franklin, Chaplain, St. Andrew's Church, Santiago.
- William Reginald Fryer, lately British Trade Correspondent, Port Elizabeth.
- Charles William Fyfield, British Council Representative, Algeria.
- John Edgar Halliday, British subject resident in Mexico.
- Reginald Henry James Hamlin, MB, ChB, Obstetrician and Gynaecologist, Princess Tsahai Memorial Hospital, Addis Ababa.
- Keith Reginald Welbore Ker, Her Majesty's Consul-General, Hanover.
- William Reid McAlpine, British Council Representative, Burma.
- Robert Antony Newbery, British subject resident in Turkey.
- Stanley Herbert Pull, British subject resident in Indonesia.
- Allen Ashard Webb, President, British Chamber of Commerce for Belgium and Luxembourg.
- Idris Herbert Williams, Cultural Attaché, Her Majesty's Embassy, Cairo.

==== Officer of the Order of the British Empire (OBE) ====
- Victor Mansfield Ashwell, Administrative Officer, Northern Nigeria.
- Constantine Walter Benson, Biologist, Department of Game and Fisheries, Northern Rhodesia.
- Clarence Askew Byrne, DSC, of Caloundra, Queensland. For services to the mining industry.
- William George Cannington, of Newcastle, State of New South Wales. For services to the community.
- Charles William Edward Wimhurst Cartwright, of Marandellas, Southern Rhodesia. For services to agriculture.
- Anthony Joseph Cordy, Acting Deputy Permanent Secretary, Federal Ministry of Finance, Nigeria.
- William Sinton Cowie, lately Director of Telecommunications (Planning), Malaysia.
- Ian Rollo Currie, President, Euroa Bush Nursing Hospital, Victoria.
- Roy Arthur James Damerell, Chief Industrial Relations Officer, Kenya.
- Harold Whitmore Dart, Managing Secretary, Prisoners' Aid Association, New South Wales.
- Kenneth Davis, General Manager, Singapore Harbour Board.
- Anthony Edgar Dorman, Director of Veterinary Services, Kenya.
- Hudson William Dougall, Pasture Research Chemist, Grassland Research Station, Kitale, Kenya.
- Frederick Gerard Duggan, assistant director of Public Works (Roads), Malaysia.
- Edwin Everett, Commandant of Preventive Service, Board of Customs and Excise, Federal Ministry of Finance, Nigeria.
- John Edwin Fairbairn, Assistant Commissioner, Sabah Component, Royal Malaysia Police.
- John Dow Finlayson, MB, ChB, formerly deputy director of Medical Services, Sarawak.
- William Ford, Deputy Commissioner of Police, Northern Nigeria.
- Thomas Amesbury Frankcomb, of Huonville, Tasmania. For services to the community.
- Victor William Gillespie, Mayor of Windsor, New South Wales.
- Cyril Allerton Glew, of Perth, Western Australia. For services to education and the welfare of youth.
- Ellen Jane Gourley, JP, of South Ballarat, Victoria. For social welfare services, particularly in the interests of women and girls.
- Gordon James Muirhead Gray, Assistant Labour Commissioner, Kenya.
- Maurice Edgar Hamer, JP. For services to local government in Western Australia.
- James Patrick Hannay. For services to the British community in Assam, India.
- Eric Theodore Milliard, MB, CHM, formerly Director of State Psychiatric Services, New South Wales.
- Albert Thomas Hinchliffe, of Toowoomba, State of Queensland. For services to journalism and community affairs.
- Eamon Joseph Hughes, Chief Accountant, Port Swettenham Authority, Malaysia.
- Eric Hillyer Ibbitson. For public services, particularly as chairman of the Board of Governors of the combined English Senior School, Cyprus.
- Keith Wallace Ingram, Chief of the Sawmilling Division, Woods and Forests Department, South Australia.
- Edward Stanley James, Administrative Officer (Staff Grade), Eastern Nigeria.
- Norman Joseph James, of Hampton, Victoria. For services to the Boy Scout Movement.
- John Derek Llewellyn-Jones, MB, BCh, Specialist Obstetrician and Gynaecologist, General Hospital, Kuala Lumpur, Malaysia.
- Stephen Geoffrey King, Secretary, Local Government Association, Queensland.
- Oliver Staniforth Knowles, Under Secretary in charge of Development, Planning and Development Expenditure, Kenya.
- James Wilfred Leach, MBE, Administrative Officer (Staff Grade), Eastern Nigeria.
- Leslie Arthur Little, MLA. For public services in Nyasaland.
- Peter Long, Deputy Commissioner of Police, Nyasaland.
- Councillor Arthur Ranald McAllister, JP, Mayor of Geelong, Australia.
- Thomas Paterson McBrierley, Senior Assistant Commissioner of Police, Kenya.
- Douglas Esdaile Macgregor, Chief Veterinary Officer, Northern Nigeria.
- John Hewitt Bolton-Maggs, Chief Inspector of Education, Northern Nigeria.
- Norman Derek Matthews, Senior Assistant Secretary, Nyasaland.
- Julia Sheila Murphy, lately Matron, Government Hospital, Zanzibar.
- Donald James Newlands. For services to local government in South Australia.
- John Le Maistre d'Auvergne Nicolle. For services to agriculture in Southern Rhodesia.
- Major Gerald Cornelius Vincent O'Driscoll, MB, BCh, Principal Medical Officer, Northern Nigeria.
- William Charles Le Page, Chief Electrical Engineer, Ministry of Transport and Communications, Northern Rhodesia.
- Alderman Oliver George Parnham, Mayor of Bathurst, New South Wales.
- Roger William Dawes Pawle, Deputy Provincial Commissioner, Central Province, Northern Rhodesia.
- Charles Malcolm Phillips, FRCS, LRCP, Specialist Ophthalmologist, Northern Rhodesia.
- Gabriel Frank Pollard, Senior Administrative Officer, Nyasaland.
- Lieutenant-Colonel David Gordon Fremoult Pringuer, Senior Superintendent of Police, Kenya.
- Philip Craddock Randell, ED, formerly Chief Conservator of Forests, Northern Nigeria.
- Philip Arthur Richardson, Under Secretary, Nyasaland.
- Ronald Frederick Roper, Permanent Secretary, Ministry of Mineral and Water Resources, Uganda.
- Trevor Bertram Rouse, chairman, State Lottery Trustees, Southern Rhodesia, 1956–1963.
- John Hilary Smith, Deputy Secretary to Premier of Northern Nigeria.
- Arthur John Spicer, Senior Inspector of Education, Northern Nigeria.
- Eric Henry Stanes, MC. For services to the British community in South India.
- Alfred Murdoch Stuart, of Linden Park, South Australia. For services to the fruit and vegetable industry.
- Jack Edward Clive Thornton, MBE, Secretary, Bureau for the Co-ordination of External Aid to Education, Nigeria.
- The Reverend Hubert Hedley Trigge, of Taringa, Queensland. For services to the Methodist Church and education.
- Elizabeth Margaret Usher, Under Secretary, Ministry of Agriculture, Kenya.
- William Desmond Wilson, MBE, MC, formerly Administrative Officer, Class 1, Northern Nigeria.
- Margaret Jean Latta Wood, Commissioner of the Girl Guides' Association for South Australia.
- Stanley Charles Wood, Chief Education Officer, Uganda.
- Milton Pentonville Allen, Speaker of the Legislative Council, Saint Christopher-Nevis-Anguilla.
- The Right Reverend Leonard Alufurai. For public services in the Western Pacific.
- Paul Gustave Arthur Anthony. For public services in Mauritius.
- James Robert Bruce, Resident Magistrate, Ascension Island.
- Edgar Cochrane, MD, ChB, Senior Medical Officer of Health, Barbados.
- Sidney Elizabeth Croskery, MD, ChB. For public services in Aden.
- The Reverend James Davison, chairman, British Guiana District, Methodist Church.
- Wilbur Edgar Donovan, ISO. For public services in Fiji.
- Silvio Casimir Bettencourt-Gomes, MB, ChB, Senior Physician, St. Joseph's Mercy Hospital, British Guiana.
- William Alfred Hoare, MBE, Government Printer, British Honduras.
- Charles John Hunter, Director of Education, Bechuanaland Protectorate.
- Rawle Shilstone Jordan, Chief Education Officer, Barbados.
- Kenneth John Winton Lane, MVO, Secretary to the Prime Minister and Cabinet, Gambia.
- Eric Vernon Lawson. For public services in the Western Pacific.
- Joseph Le Roy, Electoral Commissioner, Mauritius.
- Ellen Li Tsao Sau-Kwan, MBE, JP. For public services in Hong Kong.
- Alexander James Smith McFadzean, MD, FRCP, Professor of Medicine, University of Hong Kong.
- Edward Parr Wilmot-Morgan, assistant director of Public Works, Hong Kong.
- Martin Pounder, Chief Industrial Officer, Bahamas.
- Thomas Egbert Noble Smith, JP. For public services in Grenada.
- Edmund Harold Stuart, Member of Civil Service Commission, Bahamas.
- Fred Gainford Taharally, Commissioner of Labour, Ministry of Labour, Health and Housing, British Guiana.
- Patrick Charles Temple, Commissioner of Police, Swaziland.
- Alan Tregarthen Trenerry. For public services in Hong Kong.
- Goinsamy Venkatasamy, Principal Assistant Secretary, Mauritius.
- Eric Wood, Port Officer, Aden Port Trust.
- Charles Metam Yeats. For public services in Basutoland.
- John Kevin Flanagan Bamford, Her Majesty's Consul, Cleveland.
- Herbert Blackstone, British Vice-Consul (Commercial), Genoa.
- Alfred Brocas, British Vice-Consul, Lyons.
- Leslie David Casbon, Headmaster of the English School, Addis Ababa.
- Phyllis Esme Donaldson, Head of the English School in The Hague.
- George Richard Evison, Accountant, Her Majesty's Embassy, Buenos Aires.
- Mary Winifred Fanning, Commercial Officer, Her Majesty's Consulate-General, New York.
- John Agustin Franks, British subject resident in Spain.
- Barbara Brent Glazebrook, lately Shorthand typist, Her Majesty's Embassy, Tripoli.
- Gerald Edwin Earl Hakim, British subject resident in France.
- The Reverend Francis Mustapha Harrison, British subject resident in Costa Rica.
- Robert Fletcher Harrison, lately Assistant Representative, British Council, Indonesia.
- Frederick Walter Werner Murray, Her Majesty's Consul, Munich.
- Peter Charles Stephen Ortega, British Pro-Consul, Barcelona.
- William Alfred Thomas Pulleyblank, Commercial Officer, Her Majesty's Consulate-General, Tangier.
- Iris Sarah Riddle, Shorthand-typist, Her Majesty's Embassy, Athens.
- Marie Therese Ryan, Headmistress, Indian-Pakistani School, Kuwait Oil Company.
- John Henderson Taylor, Headmaster of Sharjah and Dubai Trade Schools.
- Aline Yvonne Thomas, Archivist, Her Majesty's Legation, Holy See.
- Alan Goodwin Thorniley, British subject resident in Belgium.
- Edith Alicia Urquhart, Her Majesty's Vice-Consul, Bucharest.
- David Lancaster Wetton, Senior Market Officer, Her Majesty's Embassy, Berne.
- John Murray Wilson, Assistant Representative and Science Officer, British Council, Brazil.
- Ethel Evelyn Primrose Winch, Personal Assistant to Her Majesty's Ambassador, Tokyo.
- Henry Charles Abbott. For philanthropic services in Tasmania.
- Janet Adams, of the British Red Cross Society. For services in Zanzibar.
- Harold McPherson Austin, of Skipton, Victoria. For services to the community, especially to returned ex-servicemen.
- Ronald Babonau, Field Officer, Royal Commonwealth Society for the Blind.
- Joan Best, of the British Red Cross Society. For services in Cyprus.
- Kathleen Betuel. For services to the community in Eastern Nigeria.
- Molly Patricia Eileen Bisshopp, Personal Secretary to Minister of Agriculture, Kenya.
- George Harold Briffett, Assistant Commissioner of Police, Nigeria.
- Edward John Tatton Brockman, JP. For services to local government in Western Australia.
- James Bullock, Superintendent, Ijora Power Station, Federal Ministry of Mines and Power, Nigeria.
- Helen Margaret Burness, lately Senior Public Enlightenment Officer, Northern Nigeria.
- Alice Dorothy Burns. For services to the teaching of the deaf in New South Wales.
- Theophilos Lawrence Butler, Principal Surveyor, Federal Ministry of Works and Surveys, Nigeria.
- Isabel Yarrow Caithness, of Williamstown, Victoria. For charitable and welfare services.
- Councillor Thomas James Campbell, chairman, Kolan Shire Council, Queensland.
- Michael Ambrose Cardew, Senior Pottery Officer, Ministry of Trade and Industry, Northern Nigeria.
- Doris Anne Mary Carver, Personal Assistant to chairman, Federal Public Service Commission, Nigeria.
- Katie Turner Chartres, of Sydney, New South Wales. For services to Music.
- Joseph Mulenga Chituta, District Assistant, Northern Rhodesia.
- Helen Joyce Cholmeley, Matron of the Home for Sick Children, Kyrenia, Cyprus.
- Constance Mary Cooke, JP, of Kensington Gardens, South Australia. For social welfare services, particularly in the interests of Aborigines.
- Sadie Miriam Corner, Matron of the Leonora District Hospital, Western Australia.
- Anthony Joseph Coyne, of Mackay, Queensland. For services to the sugar industry.
- Norton Douglas Dale, Supervisor, Document Reproduction Centre, Northern Rhodesia.
- Howell Davies, Chief Tsetse Control Officer, Ministry of Animal and Forest Resources, Northern Nigeria.
- Major Morrell Geoffrey Eliot, Sergeant-at-Arms, National Assembly of Kenya.
- Herbert James Elliott, of Perth, Western Australia. For services in the field of athletics.
- Joseph John Evans. For services to the British community in Bihar, India.
- Effie, Rebecca Fish, of Oatlands, Tasmania. For services to the community, particularly to ex-Servicemen and their dependants.
- Mabel Agnes Wallace Fyfe, Officer in charge, Treasury Records Office, Southern Rhodesia.
- Peter Bawtree Gibbs, Reserve Superintendent, British South Africa Police Reserve, Southern Rhodesia.
- Enzo George Giglioli, Manager, Mwea Irrigation Scheme, Kenya.
- Robert Grenville Gilbert, Agricultural Superintendent (Mechanical), Northern Nigeria.
- Beatrice Florence Hall, Head of Registry, Women's Migration and Oversea Appointments Society.
- Michael Howard Spencer Hall, Administrative Officer, Nyasaland.
- Phillip Godfrey Harris, Acting Senior Assistant Commissioner of Revenue, Northern Nigeria.
- Councillor William Henry Hart, chairman, Blackall Shire Council, Queensland.
- Frank Herbert Hathaway, Works Manager, Eastern Nigeria.
- John Leighton Hill, Honorary Organiser and Director, Grammarians and Public Schools' Tennis Association, Victoria.
- Patricia Hubbard, Principal of the Preparatory School at Narayanganj, East Pakistan.
- Harry Russell Hunt, Principal, Government Technical Training School, Bukuru, Northern Nigeria.
- Ian Guy Imray. For services to the community in Blantyre and Limbe, Nyasaland.
- Irene Marie Inwood, Staff Inspector, Department of Education, New South Wales.
- Morris Gregory Israel, Traffic Manager, Port Swettenham Authority, Malaysia.
- James Archie Donaldson Jackson, Conservator of Forests, Northern Nigeria.
- Cyril Rudolph Keel, Superintendent, Royal Malaysia Police.
- George Wilson Low, Livestock Improvement Officer, Kenya.
- The Reverend Matthew Shatalimi Lucheya, formerly chairman and General Superintendent of the Methodist Church, Northern Rhodesia.
- Lilian Esther Mckenzie, of Sale, Victoria. For charitable and welfare services.
- Kenneth Macrae, Divisional Engineer, Public Works Department, Sabah.
- John Ndabiningi Knox Madzima. For social services in Southern Rhodesia, particularly to the physically handicapped.
- James Brown Marshall, Secretary of the Royal Agricultural Society of Western Australia.
- Patricia Jane Martin, Personal Secretary to the Inspector General of Police, Kenya.
- John Eppes Maynard, Administrative Officer, Nyasaland.
- James Fulton Miller, formerly Chief Works Superintendent (Water), Northern Nigeria.
- Esther Margaret Eleanor Muirhead, in recognition of her services in the organisation of charitable works in South India.
- Goolammuhammad Suleman Patel, of Lusaka, Northern Rhodesia. For services to the community.
- Harold Sydney Peters, Deputy Chief Local Courts Commissioner, Nyasaland.
- Philip Pullicino, Clerk of the Uganda National Assembly.
- James Stanley Rattray, Senior Executive Engineer, North Kedah, Malaysia.
- Clifford Stanley Read, Radiographer, Federal Ministry of Health, Nigeria.
- Daisy Donaldson Richmond. For services to the community, particularly to the sick and elderly, in New South Wales.
- John Herbert Robinson, of Fairfield, Queensland. For services to yachting.
- Harry Rook, Senior Executive Engineer, Public Works Department, Kuala Lumpur, Malaysia.
- John Elliott Ross, of Hendra, Queensland. For services to Education.
- John Fletcher Ross, Assistant Commissioner of Police, Nigeria.
- Clifford Saunders, Executive Engineer, Northern Nigeria.
- Florence Rachel Le Lievre Savage, of Newcastle, New South Wales. For welfare services to the community.
- William McCall Say, JP, of Benalla, Victoria. For services to the community.
- Lottie Sharfstein, MB, CHM, of Auburn, New South Wales. For services to Medicine.
- Sydney Gordon Solomon, of Mitcham, South Australia. For services to returned ex-servicemen.
- Elizabeth Stoodley, of Kingaroy, Queensland. For services to the community, particularly in connection with the Red Cross Society and the Country Women's Association.
- Gwenneth Margaret Streets, Government Reception Officer, Office of the Prime Minister, Kenya.
- Councillor Lloyd Carlyon Trevaskis, JP, of Shepparton, Victoria. For services to local government.
- Francis Uher, Chief Photographer, Information Service, Northern Nigeria.
- Kenneth Geoffrey Vale, Senior Planning Assistant, Ministry of Lands and Works, Northern Rhodesia.
- Thomas Martin Green Vowles, of Loxton, South Australia. For services to the community and local government.
- Florence Watson, Mission Nursing Sister, Luampa Mission, Mankoya, Northern Rhodesia.
- Mary Elizabeth West, lately Matron, Garrawarra Hospital, Waterfall, New South Wales.
- Doris Winifred Wilding, Matron-in-Charge of the Opal Hostel, Brisbane, Queensland.
- Ellis William Williams, Treasury Officer of Accounts, Uganda.
- Lilian Jean Williams, Social Welfare Worker, Federal Ministry of Labour, Nigeria.
- Alfred Arthur Wright, of Bibbenluke, New South Wales. For services to local government.
- Muhammad Ibrahim Ashrif, Agronomist, Gambia.
- Shiri Kisam Balgovind. For public services in Fiji.
- Paget Spencer Berridge. For services to sport in Saint Christopher-Nevis-Anguilla.
- Frank Milton Blackman, Assistant Secretary (Ministry of the Premier), Barbados.
- Wilfrid Walwin Blackman, President of the Barbados Teachers' Association.
- Eric John Michael Alexander Bower, Senior Marine Officer, Hong Kong.
- Hector James Bruzon, Chief Laboratory Assistant and Deputy Analyst, Gibraltar.
- Mavis Marjorie Cheong, Senior Woman Secretary, Department of Agriculture, British Guiana.
- Mervyn Forrest Clay, JP. For public services in Fiji.
- Mary Frances Greece. For public services in the Falkland Islands.
- Olva Winfred Flax, Secretary to the Administrator, Antigua.
- Cecil Clement Godet, Supervisor of Docks, Bahamas.
- Wahib Jose Habet. For public services in British Honduras.
- Richard Robert Harris, Engineer (Telecommunications), Swaziland.
- Whitfield Frederick Hayward. For public services in Bermuda.
- Ernest Cornelius van Helden, Deputy Commandant, Auxiliary Police, Hong Kong.
- Charles Edward Hulse, Senior Marine Officer, Hong Kong.
- Iu-woon Ki, Assistant Superintendent of Urban Services, Hong Kong.
- Elizabeth Frazer Knife, JP. For public services in St. Helena.
- Wai-yin Kwok, Special Class Clerk, General Clerical Service, Hong Kong.
- Sydney Verne McIntosh, JP. For public services in St. Vincent.
- Donald Allan McIntyre, JP. For public services in Grenada.
- Pillay Mootoosamy, Postmaster, Mauritius.
- Donald Morgan, Veterinary Inspector, Seychelles.
- Eric Percival Munro, Secretary and Executive Officer, Central Housing and Planning Authority, Dominica.
- James Brockley Houston Scott Paterson. For public services in Aden.
- Father Vincent Phoofolo. For public services in Basutoland.
- Simeon Herbert Riley, Government Printer, Gambia.
- Ibrahim Robleh, Principal, Government Boys' Secondary School, Khormaksar, Aden.
- Edward Rogers, Superintendent of Police, Director of Music, British Guiana.
- Gilbert Thomas Sabido, Administrative Officer, British Honduras.
- The Reverend John Praimsook Shivrattan. For public services in British Guiana.
- Semesa Koroi Sikivou, assistant director of Education, Fiji.
- Norman Bertram Stalker, Principal Auditor, British Honduras.
- Philippus Laurens Steenkamp, District Commissioner, Bechuanaland Protectorate.
- Te Itaia Tiaoti, Pastor and acting Principal, London Missionary Society's Theological College, Tarawa, Gilbert and Ellice Islands Colony.
- Tsheko Tsheko, Tribal Secretary, Batawana Tribe, Bechuanaland Protectorate.
- James Lewis Webb, Laboratory Technologist, Mauritius.
- Kenneth Leslie Wishart. For services to sport in British Guiana.
- Wong Wan-tin. For public services in Hong Kong.

=== Companion of the Imperial Service Order (ISO) ===
Home Civil Service

- Harold Edward Beckett, Deputy Chief Scientific Officer, Department of Scientific and Industrial Research (Watford, Hertfordshire.)
- Lawrence James Birtles, chief executive officer, Ministry of Pensions and National Insurance (Fleetwood, Lancashire.)
- Cyril Arthur Briggs, Chief Accountant, Procurator-General and Treasury Solicitor's Office (Carshalton Beeches, Surrey.)
- Charles Frederick Burden, OBE, Director, Aeronautical Inspection Service, Ministry of Defence (London S.E.5.)
- Walter Robert Butcher, chief executive officer, Scottish Home and Health Department (Edinburgh 4.)
- Thomas Hutchinson Carruthers, Principal Regional Officer, Ministry of Health (Birmingham 20.)
- Cyril David Graham Cook, chief executive officer, Lord Chancellor's Office (Leigh-on-Sea, Essex.)
- Frank Cromwell, OBE, Senior Chief Executive Officer, Board of Trade (Richmond, Surrey.)
- Reginald James Davis, Principal Executive Officer, Home Office (London W.5.)
- Henry Godfrey, MBE, Assistant Private Secretary to the Secretary of State for Defence (Gravesend, Kent.)
- Charles Harold William Hall, Principal Clerk, Board of Inland Revenue (Hatfield, Hertfordshire.)
- David Richard King, Deputy Controller, Statistical Office, Board of Customs and Excise (Wallington, Surrey.)
- Owen Lambeth, Grade 2 Officer, Ministry of Labour (London N.3.)
- Catherine Matilda Liptrot, chief executive officer, National Assistance Board (Cheadle, Cheshire.)
- Denis Keron Malone, MBE. Lately Chief Executive Officer, Colonial Office (Bickley, Kent.)
- Charles Munro, Chief Architect, Ministry of Finance for Northern Ireland (Belfast 5.)
- George Edward Reading, TD, chief executive officer, Ministry of Aviation (Enfield, Middlesex.)
- James Russell, Superintending Architect, Ministry of Public Building and Works (Sevenoaks, Kent.)
- Leonard Frederick Saw, Principal, Ministry of Housing and Local Government (London W.5.)
- Hereward Philip Spratt, Deputy Keeper, Science Museum, Ministry of Education (Kew, Surrey.)
- William Swanson, Deputy Inspector of Wireless Telegraphy, General Post Office (Tunbridge Wells, Kent.)
- Frank Archer Williams, Senior Principal Scientific Officer, Ministry of Power (Leighon-Sea, Essex.)
- Alexander Winch, chief executive officer, Ministry of Transport (Ilford, Essex.)

State of Victoria

- Roy Stanley Sarah, lately Clerk of the Parliaments and Clerk of the Victorian Legislative Council.

Overseas Civil Service

- Walter James Ivan Cox, Assistant Comptroller of Customs and Excise, British Guiana.
- Aubrey Edward Peter Grimmo, Chief Medical Technologist, Hong Kong.
- Harold Rowland Hurd, Commissioner of Income Tax, Mauritius.
- Francis Graham Muirhead, OBE, lately Finance Secretary, Basutoland.

=== British Empire Medal (BEM) ===
Military Division

Royal Navy

- Chief Aircraft Artificer Peter Arnold, L/FX 100808.
- Chief Petty Officer Gunlayer Armourers Instructor (Provisional) George Frederick Barker, P/JX 804737.
- Chief Petty Officer (Gunnery Instructor) Peter John Beach, D.S.M, P/JX 145239.
- Chief Petty Officer (Coxswain) Gordon Charles Blackmore, D/JX 581279.
- Colour Sergeant (C) George William Bradford, Royal Marines, RM 6939.
- Chief Petty Officer Geraldo Brincat, E/JX 160753.
- Chief Engineering Mechanic Thomas William Bryan, E/KX 77518.
- Chief Petty Officer Writer Laurence Christian, P/MX 731158.
- Chief Airman (Aircraft handler 1st Class) Ernest Collins, L/FX 661130.
- Chief Aircraft Artificer Samuel Arthur Crosby, L/FX 87679.
- Stores Chief Petty Officer (S) Edwin Day, P/MX 789445.
- Petty Officer Electrician Charles Frederick George Deane, P/MX 803907.
- Chief Engineering Mechanic Charles Edward Richard Earl, P/KX 100695.
- Chief Radio Electrician Duncan Escott, P/MX 714298.
- Chief Electrician Jack Walter Frederick Farrow, Royal Naval Reserve, Q 991425.
- Chief Engine Room Artificer Edward Percy Fennell, P/MX 62029.
- Chief Electrical Artificer Leslie William Gilbey, P/MX 767484.
- Petty Officer Wren Gillian Diana Hinde, Women's Royal Naval Service, 111038.
- Chief Aircraft Artificer Maurice Arthur Hughes, L/FX 513306.
- Chief Petty Officer Frank Henry Bridge Kettle, P/JX 292504.
- Chief Petty Officer Walter Edward Lambert, P/JX 371949.
- Chief Radio Supervisor Jeffrey Lewington, P/JX 581075.
- Sergeant Angus John McKinley, Royal Marines, RM 10024.
- Chief Engine Room Artificer Kenneth Renshaw, D/MX 59142.
- Head Naval Nursing Auxiliary Lilian Mary Richardson, Queen Alexandra's Royal Naval Nursing Service, 0086.
- Quartermaster Sergeant (C) Harry Robertson, Royal Marines, PLY/X 2224.
- Chief Engine Room Artificer Cyril Edward Tolliday, P/MX 57635.
- Chief Electrician Roy Tomney, D/MX 856665.
- Master-at-Arms Leslie Dennis Tuffley, P/MX 714585.
- Chief Petty Officer Steward Thomas Woods, E/LX 23464.

Army

- S/22351071 Warrant Officer Class II (acting) Edwin Buck, Royal Army Service Corps.
- 22983121 Sergeant Anthony William Aldred Charlton, Royal Corps of Signals.
- 22810453 Sergeant/ Daniel James Connolly, Royal Regiment of Artillery.
- 19045988 Sergeant Anthony Albert Cornish, Royal Tank Regiment, Royal Armoured Corps.
- 19009137 Staff-Sergeant (acting) George Anthony Bryan Davis, The Royal Leicestershire Regiment.
- S/22039107 Warrant Officer Class II (acting) Kenneth Noel Evans, Royal Army Service Corps.
- 22529857 Staff-Sergeant Patrick Fitzgerald, Corps of Royal Engineers, Territorial Army.
- 22265995 Sergeant Anthony Francis John Gunderson, Royal Corps of Signals.
- 23512823 Corporal Peter Hannam, The Gloucestershire Regiment.
- S/14185427 Sergeant Percy Hanshaw, Royal Army Service Corps.
- 14067405 Staff-Sergeant James Gordon Knall, The Parachute Regiment, The Parachute Corps.
- 22930034 Sergeant (acting) George Pratt Lewis, The King's Own Scottish Borderers.
- S/22534643 Sergeant (now Warrant Officer Class II (acting)) Michael McClean, Royal Army Service Corps.
- 14433725 Staff-Sergeant James Mitchell, Intelligence Corps.
- S/22549811 Staff-Sergeant William Thomas Mitchell, Royal Army Service Corps.
- 22527009 Staff-Sergeant Harold Moxon, The Prince of Wales's Own Regiment of Yorkshire.
- 30554 Warrant Officer Class II Morton Msiska, 1st Battalion, Northern Rhodesia Regiment.
- 22537108 Sergeant Anthony Murphy, Royal Corps of Signals.
- Warrant Officer Class II Jaires Mutepfa, The Rhodesian African Rifles.
- 2280265 Warrant Officer Class II (local) Thomas Myers, DCM, The Durham Light Infantry.
- 19054131 Staff-Sergeant Charles Carruthers Oliver, Corps of Royal Engineers.
- 22231681 Staff-Sergeant Frederick Arthur Pearce, Corps of Royal Electrical and Mechanical Engineers.
- 2629106 Warrant Officer Class II (acting) James Gordon Pope, Grenadier Guards.
- 19054338 Staff-Sergeant Geoffrey Richardson, Corps of Royal Engineers.
- 22956704 Staff-Sergeant Derek Roy Roberts, The Devonshire and Dorset Regiment.
- 5770609 Warrant Officer Class II (local) Melville Edward Rudling, 1st East Anglian Regiment (Royal Norfolk and Suffolk).
- 14464592 Staff-Sergeant Alan Richard Neville Simcock, Royal Tank Regiment, Royal Armoured Corps.
- 23828555 Sergeant John Arbuckle Smith, MM, The Argyll and Sutherland Highlanders (Princess Louise's), Territorial Army.
- S/14920977 Warrant Officer Class II (acting) Oliver Duncan Smith, Royal Army Service Corps.
- 22248812 Staff-Sergeant John William Stephenson, Royal Army Pay Corps.
- 5380979 Sergeant William Henry Surman The Parachute Regiment, The Parachute Corps.
- 22259179 Sergeant George Sweetland, Honourable Artillery Company, Territorial Army.
- Sergeant Timoci Tomu Waqa, Corps of Fiji Engineers.
- DN. 11686 Warrant Officer Class II Taimu Visuwa, 2nd Battalion, Northern Rhodesia Regiment.
- 22810704 Staff-Sergeant Arthur Henry Walker, Royal Regiment of Artillery.
- S/14452118 Staff-Sergeant John Stewart White, Royal Army Service Corps.
- 14443304 Sergeant (acting) Frederick George Whitwell, Corps of Royal Engineers.
- 22265784 Staff-Sergeant (acting) Leslie Walter Wrixon, Royal Corps of Signals.

Royal Air Force

- 575555 Flight Sergeant Gordon Douglas Beardon.
- 564545 Flight Sergeant James Edmund Bolton.
- 546148 Flight Sergeant Eric Bruin.
- 4080137 Flight Sergeant (now Warrant Officer) David William John Cook.
- 713550 Flight Sergeant Lauriston Vernon Davis.
- 3079459 Flight Sergeant John Pearson Driffield.
- 969674 Flight Sergeant Archibald Guthrie.
- 572302 Flight Sergeant Terence Henry Harris.
- 942098 Flight Sergeant Geoffrey Walter Hayes.
- 1237708 Flight Sergeant Norman Alfred Hillier.
- 620396 Flight Sergeant Geoffrey Wyborn Ilsley.
- 1158199 Flight Sergeant George Kevin McCallum.
- 563906 Flight Sergeant James Frederick Munro.
- 573550 Flight Sergeant Joseph Norman Victor Payen.
- 1750471 Flight Sergeant (Acting Warrant Officer) John Peters.
- 647664 Flight Sergeant Leslie Arthur Rampton.
- 1165438 Flight Sergeant Robert Ernest Redden.
- 1920429 Chief Technician John Edmund Bygate.
- 579683 Chief Technician John Hinde.
- 576804 Chief Technician Errol Louis Noake.
- 576064 Chief Technician Patrick James O'Connell.
- 748831 Chief Technician Robert William Robson.
- 4003452 Chief Technician Douglas Russell.
- 4011147 Chief Technician Peter Arthur Stretch.
- 4144306 Sergeant Robert Arthur Capstick.
- 2357939 Sergeant Brian James Dawes.
- 1047986 Sergeant Arthur Ellis.
- 587748 Sergeant Michael Charles Fiske.
- 1049517 Sergeant Reginald Edward Hart.
- 1676690 Sergeant William John Hodson.
- 4116750 Sergeant Brian Leonard Mumford.
- 2141494 Sergeant Lucy Mary Frances Nicholson, Women's Royal Air Force.
- 4051236 Sergeant Donald Samuel Sharpe.
- 4025343 Sergeant Ronald Walter Smith.
- 592642 Sergeant John Alan Webb.
- 592884 Corporal John William Dowse.
- 3148407 Corporal Fred Alan Ingham.
- 3519428 Corporal Eric Robert Patrick Wilson.

Civil Division

United Kingdom

- Ralph Adams, Chief Supervisor, Telephone House, General Post Office, Belfast.
- Harold Watson Aedy, Foreman of Trades General, Ministry of Public Building and Works (Newbury, Berkshire.)
- Alfred William Allen, JP, Assembly Worker, Austin Motor Company (Birmingham.)
- James Anderson, Chargeman of Skilled Labourers, HMS Cambridge, Ministry of Defence (Plymouth.)
- Herbert Armstrong, Sub-Officer, Yorkshire North Riding Fire Brigade (Guisborough.)
- William Henry Aungier, Driver, Central Buses, London Transport Board (London S.W.12.)
- Howard Banbery, Senior Fitter, Samuel Taylor & Sons (Brierley Hill) Ltd (Stourbridge.)
- Herbert Banfield, Charge Hand, General Electric Company Ltd., Wembley.
- Frederick Barlow, Sub-Postmaster, Whitegate Drive T.S.O, Blackpool.
- Henry Barnes Barr, Works Superintendent, British Ropes Ltd., Glasgow (Rutherglen.)
- Frederick Charles Bartlett, Office Keeper, Grade II, Home Office (London S.W.15.)
- Albert Thomas Baston, Operating Theatre Attendant, Warneford Hospital, Leamington Spa.
- Harold John Bates, Foreman-Ganger, Land Drainage, Ministry of Agriculture, Fisheries and Food (Worcester.)
- Henry Richard Thomas Beer, Chargehand, Grade I, Ministry of Public Building and Works (Dover.)
- Frank Bellaby, Public Lighting Attendant (Foreman), Ilkeston District, East Midlands Electricity Board (Ilkeston.)
- Doreen Blanche, Assistant Telephone Mechanic, Post Office Factory, Newport.
- Claud Charles Boar, Chief Seed Analyst, Eastern Counties Farmers Ltd. Licensed Testing Station (Ipswich.)
- William Booth, Senior Fitter, Robert Kellie & Son, Aberdeen.
- Alexander Horace Brannan, Technical Officer Grade III, Foreign Office (Southsea.)
- Eric Edward Croydon Brittan, Civilian Instructor Grade III, Royal Air Force, Weeton, Ministry of Defence (Poulton-le-Fylde, Lancashire.)
- Charles Victor Brook, Chief Butcher, SS Andes, Royal Mail Lines Ltd (Eastleigh.)
- Nellie Brook, Cook, Hinchliffe Mill County Primary School, Huddersfield.
- Harry Brown, Foreman Turncock, City of Birmingham Water Department.
- John Robert Brown, Foreman Joiner, Blyth Dry Docks & Shipbuilding Company.
- Thomas Cahill, Quarter-Master Sergeant, Royal Hospital, Chelsea.
- Sidney Cann, Coxswain of Appledore Life-boat, Devonshire.
- Doris Clara Castle, Postal and Telegraph Officer, Head Post Office, Abingdon.
- Samuel Cheevers, Supervisor, Hot-Dip Galvanising Plant, Unicorn Engineering Company Ltd., Belfast.
- Reginald Clague, Progress Chaser, Automatic Telephone & Electric Company Ltd (Liverpool.)
- William Clark, Blacksmith. For services to the Forestry Commission, Scotland (Dumfries.)
- Harry Frederick Cory, Chief Inspector and Officer-in-Charge, Southampton Special Constabulary.
- Agnes Coutts, Member, Forfar Centre, Women's Voluntary Service.
- George Crabtree, Station Officer, Auxiliary Fire Service, West Riding of Yorkshire (Hebden Bridge.)
- John Crone, Deputy Grade I, Wearmouth Colliery, Northumberland and Durham Division, National Coal Board (Sunderland.)
- Andrew Crosbie, Chief Technician, Grade II, Blood Transfusion Centre, South-East Scotland Hospital Region (Edinburgh.)
- James Crosbie, Assistant Divisional Officer, Hastings Fire Brigade (St. Leonards.)
- Charles William Crouch, Technical Grade II, Royal Aircraft Establishment, Farnborough, Ministry of Defence.
- Frederick Cull, Chief Rescue Section Instructor, Metals Division, Imperial Chemical Industries Ltd (Smethwick, Staffordshire.)
- George Currie, Honorary Commandant, Bridgeton British Railways Section, St. Andrew's Ambulance Association (Glasgow.)
- Harold Dash, Electrical Foreman, Vosper Ltd., Portsmouth.
- Samuel Walter Davis, lately Senior Locomotive Driver, Manchester Ship Canal Company (Salford.)
- William Dawson, Senior Checker, Leeds Hunslet Lane, British Railways Board.
- Edsell Edwin Henry Day, Local Chargeman of Coppersmiths, HM Dockyard, Portsmouth, Ministry of Defence.
- William Arthur Delany, Regimental Sergeant Major, West Riding Army Cadet Force (Pontefract.)
- William Dickinson, Repair Worker, North Gawber Colliery, Yorkshire Division, National Coal Board (Barnsley.)
- Gilbert George Duery, Overman, Kilmersdon Colliery, South Western Division, National Coal Board (Bath.)
- George James Durling, Greaser, SS Orcades, Orient Steam Navigation Company Ltd (Gravesend.)
- Mohamad Mahmoud El-Hindi, Head Cavass, HM Embassy, Damascus.
- Douglas William Ellis, Driver, Esso Petroleum Company Ltd (Boston).
- Florence May Evans, Welfare Worker, No. 215 (Swansea) Squadron, Air Training Corps.
- Alfred Raine Ewart, lately Fatstock Officer, Ministry of Agriculture, Fisheries and Food (Cleator Moor, Cumberland.)
- William Eyre, General Foreman, Devon River Board (Exmouth.)
- Douglas Fearn, MM, Chief Observer, Post 29/A.4, Royal Observer Corps (Tarland, Aberdeenshire.)
- Clifford Henry Foster, Leading Illustrator, RAF Staff College, Bracknell, Ministry of Defence (Wokingham.)
- Duncan M. Fraser, Station Officer, Perth and Kinross Fire Brigade (Dunblane.)
- James Smith Fryett, Supervising Engineer, Grade II, Ministry of Public Building and Works (Eye, Suffolk.)
- John Fulthorpe, Assistant Storekeeper, Vickers-Armstrong (Shipbuilders) Ltd (Hebburn.)
- George Gall, Chief Steward, MV Thistledown, Allan Black & Company Ltd (Sunderland.)
- Raymond Gibson, Chief Foreman, Skinningrove Iron Company Ltd (Saltburn-by-Sea.)
- Eric Frank Gillingham, Stores Foreman, R.A.S.C, Colchester, Ministry of Defence.
- Arthur James Grayson, Conductor, Kibble Motor Services Ltd., Bootle (Liverpool.)
- John Morgan Griffiths, Technical Grade II, HM Dockyard, Rosyth, Ministry of Defence (Dunfermline.)
- Gladys Dorothy Gunner, Assistant Group Officer, Auxiliary Fire Service, Middlesex Fire Brigade (Edmonton.)
- Alfred George Hall, Bricklayer, Department of Scientific and Industrial Research (St. Albans.)
- Stanley Albert Hall, Chief Inspector, London Postal Region, General Post Office (London W.9.)
- Edward Walter Ham, Acting Draughtsman (Engineering), R.N. Aircraft Yard, Belfast. Ministry of Defence (Greenisland.)
- Anne Kynaston Hayes, Commandant, Shropshire Branch, British Red Cross Society (Loppington.)
- Elsie Ada Heel, Honorary Collector, Street Savings Group, Leicester.
- John Leslie Hemingway, Omnibus Driver, Leeds City Transport Department
- James Henderson, Sergeant, Inverness-shire Constabulary (Fort William.)
- John William Hetherington, Fitter, Denby (Drury Lowe) Colliery, East Midlands Division, National Coal Board.
- William Hickman, Foreman (Shell Production) Beans Industries Ltd., (Brierley Hill, Staffordshire.)
- Sidney Pearson Hill, Driver (Locomotive), Nottingham Motive Power Depot, British Railways Board.
- Kang Po Ho, Clerk Grade A, Hong Kong, Ministry of Defence.
- Francis Hoey, Skilled Engineering Machinist, Vauxhall Motors, Ltd (Luton.)
- Edward Holmes, Stores Assistant, Nechells Power Station, West Midlands Division, Midlands Region, Central Electricity Generating Board (Birmingham.)
- Vera Ellen Hope, Chief Supervisor, Potters Bar Telephone Exchange, General Post Office (Welwyn.)
- Foster Owen Horn, General Fitter, 43 Command Workshop, R.E.M.E, Ministry of Defence (Farnham, Surrey.)
- Frederick Horton, Foreman, Jessop-Saville Ltd., Sheffield.
- Walter Ernest House, Honorary Collector, Brockley Street Savings Group, Weston-super-Mare.
- Violet Monica Howard, Chief Supervisor, Telephone Exchange, Guildford, General Post Office.
- Harold John Hughes, Station and Yard Master, Ponrypool Road, British Railways Board (Pontypool.)
- Demetris Ioannides, Clerk of Works, Dhekelia, Cyprus, Ministry of Public Building and Works.
- Albert Peter Jackson, Technical Class Grade II, Aldermaston, United Kingdom Atomic Energy Authority (Newbury.)
- Doris Eugenie Alica Jackson, Member of Centre Staff, Scunthorpe, Women's Voluntary Service.
- Walter Bassett Jackson, Foreman Packer, Victoria and Albert Museum (London W.10.)
- William Leslie Jacobs, Airport Foreman 1, London (Heathrow) Airport, Ministry of Aviation (Heston.)
- David Isaac Jenkins, Process and Supervisory Grade III, Rocket Propulsion Establishment, Ministry of Aviation (Aylesbury.)
- Violet Emily Jenkins, Honorary Savings Collector, Austin Motors Sewing Shop, Rubery, Birmingham.
- Nora Vivienne Johnson, Chief Supervisor, Millgate Exchange, Salford, General Post Office.
- Arthur Lloyd Jones, Chief Inspector, Denbighshire Constabulary (Abergele.)
- James Thomas Jones, Charge-hand, Vono Ltd., Tipton (Dudley.)
- Thomas Powell Jones, Clerk of Works, Grade II, Ministry of Agriculture, Fisheries and Food (Bangor.)
- Edward Kearns, Hospital Chief Officer Class I, Grendon Psychiatric Prison, Home Office (Aylesbury.)
- John Alfred Keightley, Chief Officer Class I, Prison Sendee Staff College, Home Office (Wakefield).
- Arthur Thomas Kerr, Inspector, Lincolnshire Special Constabulary (Grantham.)
- Charles Edward King, Boatswain, MV British Venture, B.P. Tanker Company Ltd (Sunderland.)
- Matthew William King, Technical Officer, Telephone Area, Belfast, General Post Office.
- John Koshy, Storekeeper Grade B, RAF Seletar, Ministry of Defence.
- Reginald Horace Lane, Foreman, Public Record Office (Carshalton, Surrey.)
- Frederick Norman Lee, Joiner, Chester Production Station, North Western Gas Board.
- Joseph Logan, Steel Moulder, The North British Steel Foundry Ltd (Bathgate, West Lothian.)
- Ernest Arthur Longhurst, Senior Overlooker, Royal Ordnance Factory, Glascoed, Ministry of Defence.
- Charles Clement Lowe, Technical Officer, London Telecommunications Region, General Post Office (London N.8.)
- Hilda Bridget McAleese, Forewoman, Marchon Products Ltd., Whitehaven, Cumberland.
- Hugh Manson Macbeath, Sergeant Major Instructor, Army Cadet Force, County of Caithness (Wick.)
- Alexander MacBey, District Motive Power Inspector, Inverness, British Railways Board (Ardersier.)
- David Henry McCartney, Inspector of Constabulary, RAF Hartlebury, Ministry of Defence (Kidderminster.)
- Margaret Enid McDonald, Centre Organiser, New Forest R.D (East), Women's Voluntary Service.
- Allan MacDougall, Volunteer-in-Charge, Coast Life-Saving Corps, Tarbert, Harris.
- Patrick Joseph McGoldrick, Forester, Ministry of Agriculture for Northern Ireland (Newry.)
- John McGonigle, Foreman of Stores, Ministry of Public Building and Works (Havant, Hampshire.)
- Ian McLean, Chief Ship's Cook, MV Celtic Monarch, General Service Contracts (Glasgow.)
- Gavin Brown Macpherson, JP, Foreman Spinner, The Gourock Ropework Company Ltd (New Lanark.)
- Mary Druscilla Marlow, Sub-Postmistress, Holcombe Sub-Post Office, Dawlish.
- Gordon George Marriner, Head Gardener, Leeming, Ministry of Public Building and Works (Northallerton.)
- Dorothy Maslem, Foster-mother, Hastings.
- Albert Edward Mayman, Depot Superintendent, Shipley, British Waterways Board (Skipton.)
- Frank Meadowcroft, Assistant Divisional Officer, West Sussex Fire Brigade (Chichester.)
- Edward Middleton, Office Keeper Grade I, Ministry of Defence (Hockley, Essex.)
- Robert John Moore, Sergeant, Royal Ulster Constabulary (Belfast.)
- George James Morgan, Progress and General Supervisory Grade IV, Royal Ordnance Factory, Pembrey, Ministry of Defence.
- Lai Chung Nam, Leading Quantity Surveying Assistant, Hong Kong, Ministry of Public Building and Works.
- Mary Nicoll, Leading Firewoman, Glasgow Fire Brigade.
- Joseph Leslie Norton, County Road Foreman, Nottinghamshire County Council (Tixford.)
- Ellen Ockenden, Honorary Collector, Aston School Savings Group, Stevenage, Hertfordshire.
- William Percival Palmer, Auxiliary Postman, Bewdley, Worcestershire.
- James Vernon Parfitt, Ballast and Wagon Inspector, Newport, British Railways Board (Newport.)
- Wilfred Henry Parnaby, Storekeeper, North Eastern Electricity Board (Ripon.)
- John Angus Paterson, Ferryman, Isle of Berneray.
- Elizabeth Jean Pealing. In charge of Canteen, City of Salford Sea Cadet Corps.
- Bethia Russell Pendrigh, lately Member of the County Staff, Bedfordshire, Women's Voluntary Service (Isle of Arran.)
- Eveline Harriet Price, Quartermaster, Cardigan/6 Detachment, British Red Cross Society (Aberystwyth.)
- Harold Quick, Machine Shop Foreman, James Robertson & Sons (Fleetwood) Ltd (Fleetwood.)
- Norman Charles Ratcliff, Chief Observer, Post 27/P4, Royal Observer Corps (Glasgow.)
- Esther Clara Reeve. For services to charity in Scarborough.
- Stanley Henry Reeves, Officekeeper Grade II, Commissioner's Office, Metropolitan Police Force (London S.E.6.)
- William John Rigby, Foreman Bricklayer, Bromley & Son, Church Stretton, Shropshire.
- Robert Robb, Member of Power Loading Team, Randolph Colliery, Scottish Division, National Coal Board (Kirkcaldy.)
- William Robb, Technical Officer, Telephone Exchange, Fort William, General Post Office.
- Kathleen E. Robesok, Specialist Driver, Headquarters, Women's Voluntary Service (London S.W.I.)
- Benjamin Roe, First Class Gasfitter, Sheffield Sales and Service Department, East Midlands Gas Board.
- Jack Roy, Head Foreman, Brown Bayley Steels Ltd (Sheffield.)
- William Sands, Sub-District Commandant, Ulster Special Constabulary (Lurgan.)
- Elizabeth Shaw, Honorary Collector, "New Briar Rose" Street Savings Group, Warrington.
- Thomas Ford Sherlock, Technical Grade II, Risley, United Kingdom Atomic Energy Authority (Warrington.)
- Herbert Shingles, Machinist, Ford Motor Company Ltd (Dagenham.)
- Bernard Sidwell, Inspector, Head Post Office, Coventry.
- John Arthur Slade, Maintenance Officer Non-Mechanic Supervisory Class, R.N. Engineering College, Ministry of Defence (Plymouth.)
- George Herbert Slater, Range Warden, Diggle Rifle Range, Oldham.
- George Edward Smith, Technical Officer, Grade II, Office of the Receiver for the Metropolitan Police District (Worcester Park, Surrey.)
- James Smith, Civilian Instructor, No. 1832 (Harpurhey) Squadron, Air Training Corps (Manchester.)
- John Smith, Office Keeper, Grade I, Scottish Home and Health Department (Edinburgh.)
- Edna Annie Snape, Attendant, Home for infirm aged women, Manchester City Council.
- Walter George Spier, Mess Steward Grade I, School of Infantry, Warminster, Ministry of Defence (Westbury.)
- Harold Edward Francis Stacey, House Foreman, Television Centre, British Broadcasting Corporation (London S.E.17.)
- Isaac Barwise Stephenson, Foreman, West Lakeland District, Workington, North Western Electricity Board (Cockermouth.)
- John Sweeney, Senior Ganger, Permanent Way Department, London Transport Board (London N.W.10.)
- Francis Talman, Supervisor of Apprentices, Aluminium Plant Vessel Company Ltd. Crawley, Sussex.
- John Henry Taylor, Technical Officer, Grade III, Ministry of Health (Sully, Glamorganshire.)
- David Aeron James Thomas, Laboratory Steward, Ministry of Agriculture, Fisheries and Food (Aberystwyth.)
- Jane Thomas, Member, County Staff, Shropshire, Women's Voluntary Service (Whitchurch.)
- William Thomas, Chargehand Auxiliary Plant Attendant, Tir John Power Station, South Wales Division, South Western Region, Central Electricity Generating Board (Swansea.)
- Joseph Thompson, Patternmaker, Hawker Siddeley Aviation Ltd., Brough.
- William Thomas Tipple, Overman, Newdigate Colliery, West Midlands Division, National Coal Board (Bedworth, Warwickshire.)
- John Tranter, Cocoa Presser, Cadbury Brothers, Ltd. (Birmingham.)
- Daisy Roberta Tripp, Honorary Collector, Street Savings Group, Hackney, London (London E.8.)
- Emily Margaret Trotter, Assistant Supervisor (Telegraphs), Head Post Office, Darlington.
- Sybil Ella Van Maurik, Member, Women's Voluntary Service, Tunbridge Wells.
- James Donald Vass, Donkeyman/Greaser, MV Melrose, George Gibson and Company Ltd (Edinburgh.)
- Cecil Edgar Warren, Senior Foreman, Training and Education Section, North Thames Gas Board (London W.10.)
- William Alfred Thomas Westlake, Foreman of Machine Shop, Willoughby (Plymouth) Ltd (Plympton.)
- Frank Idris Whatley, JP, Repairer, Marine Colliery, South Western Division, National Coal Board (Ebbw Vale.)
- Agnes Wheelhouse, Honorary Collector, Daffil Road Savings Group, Morley, Leeds.
- James Percival Willis, Corporal, Alverstoke Ambulance Division, County of Hampshire, St. John Ambulance Brigade, (Gosport.)
- Chong Wong, Local Chargeman of Trades, HM Dockyard, Singapore, Ministry of Defence.
- James Wrenn, Civilian Stores Officer Grade II, 64 Central Engineer Stores Depot, Montrose, Ministry of Defence.
- Harold Wright, Research and Development Craftsman (Special), Waltham Abbey, Ministry of Aviation (Waltham Cross.)
- Peter Wright, Staff Foreman, Wm. Beardmore & Company Ltd. (Renfrew.)
- Ernest Frederick Wyatt, Chief Inspector, Regional Headquarters, London Postal Region, General Post Office (London N.13.)

Overseas Territories

- St. Clair Simmonds, Butler, Government House, Antigua.
- Ormiston Frederick Warner, Head Butler, Government House, Barbados.
- Thomas George Chalmers, General Foreman, Public Works Department, Bermuda.
- George Swann, Temporary Supervisor, Public Works Department, Fiji.
- Lang Koma Sanyang, First Grade Interpreter, Gambia.
- Olga Laura Anita Gage, Nursing Superintendent, British Red Cross Society, Saint Lucia.
- Albert Gendron, Inspector of Plantations, Seychelles.
- Simeon Paza Makini, Examining Officer, Customs Department, British Solomon Islands Protectorate, Western Pacific.

State of New South Wales

- George Kidd, lately Principal Attendant, Legislative Council of New South Wales.

State of Victoria

- John Barnes, Secretary, Shrine of Remembrance Trustees.
- Clarence Thomas Norton Stone, Officer in Charge, Diamond Creek Fire Brigade.

Malaysia

- Arthur Buxton, Inspector of Works, Public Works Department, Sabah.

Zanzibar

- Norman Livsey, Laboratory Technologist, Health Department.

Southern Rhodesia

- Brian Reginald Ashby, Police Reservist, British South Africa Police.
- Kenneth Edward Forbes, Police Reservist, British South Africa Police.
- Stewart Nelson Howes, Overseer, Ministry of Roads and Road Traffic.

Northern Rhodesia

- Enos Mutwale, Medical Assistant, Ministry of Health.
- Paul Timothy Tembo, Technical Assistant, Ministry of Agriculture.
- Bennett Chungu, Head Chauffeur, Government House.
- Timothy Musukwa, Head District Messenger.

Nyasaland

- Wilfred Chipanda, Driver, Government House.

=== Royal Victorian Medal (RVM) ===
- William Baker.
- William Francis Burfoot.
- Ernest Arthur Day.
- Divisional Sergeant Major Norman Finch, VC, Her Majesty's Bodyguard of the Yeomen of the Guard.
- Ann Ellen Jones.
- Stanley Louis Martin.
- Alexander Laird McGregor.
- Chief Petty Officer Cook (S) Harry Moore Merrie, P/MX 56563.
- Frank Muggridge.
- Frederick George Richardson.
- Robert Charles Smith.
- William Keir Thow.
- Alexander Weddle.

=== Queen's Police Medal (QPM) ===
England and Wales

- Edwin Peter Blake White, Chief Constable, Gloucestershire Constabulary.
- Kenwyn Edgar Steer, Chief Constable, Exeter City Police.
- Alfred Thomas Cullen, MBE, Chief Constable, Southampton City Police.
- Richard Dawnay Lemon, CBE, Chief Constable, Kent Constabulary.
- James Cocksworth, Detective Superintendent, Kingston-upon-Hull City Police.
- Thomas Peter Woolley, Superintendent, Leicester City Police.
- Leonard Arthur Pearcey, Superintendent, Metropolitan Police.
- William James Richards, Assistant Chief Constable and Deputy Chief Constable, Manchester City Police.
- Philip Douglas Knights, Deputy Commandant, Police College (Assistant Chief Constable seconded from Birmingham City Police).
- Maurice John Ray, Detective Superintendent, Metropolitan Police.
- Frederick Brough, Superintendent, Metropolitan Police.
- John Herbert Dodridge, Detective Chief Superintendent, Warwickshire Constabulary.

Scotland

- Robert Cribbes, Chief Superintendent, Edinburgh City Police.
- William Alexander White, Chief Superintendent, Glasgow City Police.

Northern Ireland

- James Francis Fay, Head Constable, Royal Ulster Constabulary.

State of New South Wales

- Colin Henry Symes, Superintendent 2nd Class, New South Wales Police Force.
- Norman Lindsay Hind, Superintendent 2nd Class, New South Wales Police Force.
- Albert Edward Windsor, Detective Superintendent 3rd Class, New South Wales Police Force.
- Eric Robert Dew, Superintendent 3rd Class, New South Wales Police Force.
- George Malcolm Lithgow, Superintendent 3rd Class, New South Wales Police Force.
- Robert Alfred Debney, Superintendent 3rd Class, New South Wales Police Force.

State of South Australia

- Laurence Peter Hansberry, Senior Inspector, South Australia Police Force.
- Maurice Evans, Inspector, South Australia Police Force.

Federal Republic of Nigeria

- Leslie Alfred Marsden, Deputy Commissioner of Police, Federal Republic of Nigeria.

Southern Rhodesia

- James Spink, Senior Assistant Commissioner, British South Africa Police.

Nyasaland

- Dennis Benjamin Moore, Senior Assistant Commissioner of Police, Nyasaland.

Overseas Territories

- Hamed Abdul Karim Khan, Assistant Commissioner of Police, Aden.
- Frederick Llambias, Chief Superintendent of Police, Gibraltar.

=== Queen's Fire Services Medal (QFSM) ===
England and Wales

- Harold James Terry, MBE, Chief Officer, Derbyshire Fire Brigade.
- Frederick John Capron, Chief Officer, Warwickshire Fire Brigade.
- Ernest Charles Wookey, Divisional Officer, Bristol Fire Brigade.
- Joseph Edwards, Assistant Divisional Officer (Deputy Chief Officer), Great Yarmouth Fire Brigade.

Scotland

- George Patrick Joseph Cooper, Assistant Firemaster, Glasgow Fire Brigade.

=== Colonial Police Medal (CPM) ===
Southern Rhodesia

- George Atkinson, Chief Superintendent, British South Africa Police.
- William Edward Colbourne, Superintendent, British South Africa Police.
- Lawrence Lamond, Chief Superintendent, British South Africa Police.
- Nyamayaro, Detective Station Sergeant, British South Africa Police.
- Dickson Kanowadza Nyamkapa, Sergeant, British South Africa Police.
- Phineas Matarirano Nyika, Sub-Inspector, British South Africa Police.
- Amos Gutu Shoko, Sergeant, British South Africa Police.

Northern Rhodesia

- James Blackman Attenborough, Superintendent, Northern Rhodesia Police Force.
- Robert James Barkley, Superintendent, Northern Rhodesia Police Force.
- Gordon Mukaya Kabage, Detective Assistant Inspector, Northern Rhodesia Police Force.
- Herbert Kalenje, Detective Sub-Inspector, Northern Rhodesia Police Force.
- Samson Kapembwa, Detective Sub-Inspector, Northern Rhodesia Police Force.
- Gordon Howard Layne, Superintendent, Northern Rhodesia Police Force.
- Ian Ross Mackintosh, Superintendent, Northern Rhodesia Police Force.
- Philip Frederick Murch, Senior Superintendent, Northern Rhodesia Police Force.
- Robert Chiwanga Lubwusha Mwelwa, Detective Head Constable, Northern Rhodesia Police Force.
- Leonard John Sutton, MC, Senior Superintendent, Northern Rhodesia Police Force.
- Henry Taylor, Assistant Superintendent, Northern Rhodesia Police Force.
- Kenneth Henry West, Assistant Superintendent. Northern Rhodesia Police Force.

Nyasaland

- Colin Harold Millington Limb, Superintendent, Nyasaland Police Force.
- Albert Malcolm Parry, Senior Superintendent. Nyasaland Police Force.

Overseas Territories

- Claude Shirley Baird, Assistant Superintendent, British Guiana Police Force.
- Dermot John Carty, Acting Senior Inspector, Hong Kong Police Force.
- Cheung Tsan, Sergeant, Hong Kong Police Force.
- Ian Colquhoun Clow, Deputy Superintendent, Fiji Police Force.
- Sahib Dad, Staff Sergeant, Hong Kong Police Force.
- Alvin Reginald Moore, Chief Inspector, British Guiana Police Force.
- No Fuk, Staff Sergeant, Hong Kong Police Force.
- Patrick John Reardon, Deputy Superintendent, Basutoland Mounted Police.
- Albert Savy, Corporal, Seychelles Police Force.
- Charles Payne Sutcliffe, MBE, Senior Superintendent, Hong Kong Police Force.
- Michael Tabede, lately Sergeant, Swaziland Police Force.
- David Sanderson Walford, BEM, Commandant of Police, British Service, New Hebrides.
- George Flight Watt, Assistant Superintendent, Hong Kong Police Force.
- Robert Noel Preston-Whyte, Superintendent, Basutoland Mounted Police.
- Yuen Se-hung, Inspector, Hong Kong Police Force.

=== Royal Red Cross (RRC) ===
- Ada Agnes Elizabeth Burman, ARRC, Principal Matron, Queen Alexandra's Royal Naval Nursing Service.
- Bridget Quill, ARRC, Matron Tutor, Queen Alexandra's Royal Naval Nursing Service.
- Lieutenant-Colonel Anne Flanagan, MBE, ARRC (206155), Queen Alexandra's Royal Army Nursing Corps.

==== Associate of the Royal Red Cross (ARRC) ====
- Major Jean Monica Adams (422350), Queen Alexandra's Royal Army Nursing Corps.
- Major Mary Murphy (328088), Queen Alexandra's Royal Army Nursing Corps.
- Captain Beryl Marianne Elizabeth Milford (440702), Queen Alexandra's Royal Army Nursing Corps.
- Squadron Officer Grace Haydock (405740), Princess Mary's Royal Air Force Nursing Service.
- Squadron Officer Janet Reid Hogland (406441), Princess Mary's Royal Air Force Nursing Service.

=== Air Force Cross (AFC) ===
Army Air Corps

- Major Stuart Russell Whitehead (354692).

Royal Air Force

- Wing Commander Maurice Adams (201980).
- Wing Commander James Stewart Wallace Bell (164601).
- Squadron Leader Harry Michael Archer (3508785).
- Flight Lieutenant Alan Harcourt Bower (3513143).
- Flight Lieutenant John Trevor Egginton (4083602).
- Flight Lieutenant Ian Haig Keppie (607421).

=== Queen's Commendation for Valuable Service in the Air ===
Royal Navy

- Lieutenant Commander Nicholas Thomas Bennett.
- Lieutenant Douglas Albert Bowler.

Royal Air Force

- Wing Commander William John Lawrence Sheehan, DFC (55853).
- Wing Commander Kenneth Stevens (202617).
- Squadron Leader (Acting Wing Commander) Kenneth John Lewis Baker (1868415).
- Squadron Leader Raymond John Bannard (4034253).
- Squadron Leader Douglas Radley Bryan (1609856).
- Squadron Leader Alan Edward Hotchkiss (2496800).
- Squadron Leader Keith Alfred Osborne Norman (181414).
- Squadron Leader Anthony Arthur Ramus (607154).
- Squadron Leader David John Seward (2420678).
- Squadron Leader Leslie Wilfred Stapleton (1590579).
- Flight Lieutenant Ian Bashall (2548532).
- Flight Lieutenant Keith Frank Beck (4147541).
- Flight Lieutenant Robin Anthony Gerald Catcheside (4178642).
- Flight Lieutenant Michael John Cawsey (3030754).
- Flight Lieutenant George Alexander Charles, MBE (153521).
- Flight Lieutenant Peter Edgar Collins (4119857).
- Flight Lieutenant Donald Donaldson-Davidson (1045219).
- Flight Lieutenant Ivor Davies, AFC (190234).
- Flight Lieutenant Walter William Elsegood (4113152).
- Flight Lieutenant John Stephen Sowdan Hay (57090).
- Flight Lieutenant Ralph Cyril Moring (1422399).
- Flight Lieutenant John Richard Morris (503857).
- Flight Lieutenant Roy Desmond Pearce (158712).
- Flight Lieutenant Ivan Tom Rutter (2209375).
- Flight Lieutenant George Alan White (2620068).
- Master Navigator Robert Henry Law (1803674).
- Master Engineer Roger James Bowen, DFM (1716011).
- Master Signaller Kenneth Morton Morris (1868873).
- 589640 Sergeant Barry Hewitt Smith.
- 682319 Corporal Colin Alexander John Bain.

United Kingdom

- Captain Walter Blackie Caldwell, OBE, Senior Captain First Class, British European Airways Corporation.
- James Gordon Harrison, AFC, Chief Test Pilot, Hawker Siddeley Aviation Ltd., Avro Whitworth Division (Woodford).
- Stanley Blackbourne Oliver, Chief Test Pilot, British Aircraft Corporation (Luton) Ltd.
- John Stephen Sanderson, Chief Flight Engineer, British United Airways.
- George Cowdrey Webb, AFC, Chief Flying Instructor, College of Air Training, Hamble.

== Australia ==
=== Knight Bachelor ===
- The Honourable John Oscar Cramer, Minister for the Army, 1956–1963.
- Leonard Charles Edward Lindon, MS, FRCS, of Fitzroy, South Australia. For services to medicine, particularly in the field of neurosurgery.
- John Kempson Maddox, VRD, MD, FRCP, of Edgecliff, New South Wales. For services to medicine.
- Richard John Randall, Deputy Secretary (Economic and Financial), Department of the Treasury.
- William Yeo, CBE, of Elizabeth Bay, New South Wales. For outstanding services on behalf of ex-servicemen.

=== Order of Saint Michael and Saint George ===
==== Knight Commander of the Order of St Michael and St George (KCMG) ====
- Walter Murdoch, CBE, of South Perth. For services to education and literature.

==== Companion of the Order of St Michael and St George (CMG) ====
- James Alexander Bissett, of Croydon, Victoria. For services to the superphosphate industry.
- Ian Dudley Hayward, MBE, of Mitcham, South Australia. For services to the community.
- Richard Godfrey Christian Parry Okeden, CBE, of Darling Point, New South Wales. For services to commerce and industry.

=== Order of the Bath ===
==== Companion of the Order of the Bath (CB) ====
Military Division

- Major-General Lawrence George Canet, CBE (342), Australian Staff Corps.

=== Order of the British Empire ===
==== Knight Commander of the Order of the British Empire (KBE) ====
Civil Division

- The Honourable Charles William Davidson, OBE, of Yeronga, Queensland. For public services.

==== Commander of the Order of the British Empire (CBE) ====
Military Division

Royal Australian Navy

- Rear-Admiral Frank Leveson George.

Australian Army

- Brigadier Percival Philip Jackson (2108), Australian Staff Corps.

Royal Australian Air Force

- Air Commodore Colin Garfield Cleary.

Civil Division

- Kenneth Binns, Chairman of the Commonwealth Literature Censorship Board.
- Charles Sylvester Booth, of Toorak, Victoria. For services to industry.
- Daniel Leo Canavan, Commissioner of Taxation.
- Lawrence Percival Coombes, DFC, of South Yarra, Victoria. For services to aviation.
- Lorna Hazel Craig, OBE, Private Secretary to the Prime Minister.
- Robert Helpmann, in recognition of his outstanding contribution to ballet.
- Stewart Jamieson, Her Majesty's Australian Ambassador Extraordinary and Plenipotentiary in Moscow.
- John Charles George Kevin, Her Majesty's Australian Ambassador Extraordinary and Plenipotentiary in Cape Town.

==== Officer of the Order of the British Empire (OBE) ====
Military Division

Royal Australian Navy

- Commander Robert Thorn Gamble, VRD, Royal Australian Naval Reserve.

Australian Army

- Lieutenant-Colonel Donald Stanley Johnston, ED (2255104), Royal Australian Artillery.
- Colonel Cedric Maudsley Ingram Pearson, MC (3163), Australian Staff Corps.
- Lieutenant-Colonel Alfred David Watt (2109), Australian Staff Corps.

Royal Australian Air Force

- Wing Commander John Ewan Gerber, AFC (03486).
- Squadron Leader Roger Sidney Choate (051846).

Civil Division

- Henry Aylwin Barrenger, First Assistant Secretary, Lands and Policy Division, Department of the Interior, Canberra.
- Gordon Edward Blakers, Deputy Secretary, Department of Defence, Canberra.
- Clive Rodney Boyce, MB, ChM, of Corinda, Queensland. For services to medicine, particularly on behalf of ex-servicemen.
- The Reverend Francis Byatt, of Hawthorn, Victoria. For services in the field of social welfare.
- Colin Johnson Campbell, of Wahroonga, New South Wales. For public services.
- Alan Thomas Carmody, Deputy Secretary, Department of Trade, Canberra.
- Elsa Chauvel, of Castlecrag, New South Wales. For services to the Australian film industry.
- Cyril Staunton John Conroy, of Toowoomba, Queensland. For services to the dairying industry.
- William John Curtis, Assistant Secretary (Finance), Department of the Army, Canberra.
- Henry Erskine Downes, MB, BS, Assistant Director-General, Department of Health, Canberra.
- Gladys Jean Farthing, Matron, Repatriation Hospital, Concord, New South Wales.
- Patrick Macfarlan Hamilton, Executive Officer of the Australian-American Association.
- Herbert Harry Handby, of Medindie, South Australia. For services to the Naval Association of Australia.
- Harry Ronald Haselgrove, of Adelaide, South Australia. For services to the Wine Industry.
- Thomas Kim Hodgkinson, of Turramurra, New South Wales. For services to the legal profession.
- James Richard Hamilton Hutchison, Director, Posts and Telegraphs, New South Wales, Postmaster-General's Department.
- Philip Henry Jeffery, MBE, a former Mayor of Parramatta, New South Wales. For public services.
- Gordon Albert Jockel, Assistant Secretary, Department of External Affairs, Canberra.
- Charles Gullan McGrath, of Brighton, Victoria. For services to industry.
- Roy George Parsons, of Balwyn, Victoria. For services to the community.
- Herbert Lorraine Port, MBE, formerly First Assistant Secretary, Department of Defence, Canberra.
- Frederick Charles Sutherland, Assistant Secretary (Finance), Department of Air, Canberra.
- Robert Baden Thomson, of New Plymouth, New Zealand. For his outstanding work in Antarctic Exploration.

==== Member of the Order of the British Empire (MBE) ====
Military Division

Royal Australian Navy

- Lieutenant-Commander (S.D.) (C) Geoffrey James Harle.

Australian Army

- 21256 Warrant Officer Class II Frank Roland Adlam, Royal Australian Artillery.
- Major (Quartermaster) Stanley Roy Edgecombe (3335), Royal Australian Army Service Corps.
- 32154 Warrant Officer Class II Stephen John McMahon, Royal Australian Engineers.
- Captain Don Francis John McRae (296741), Royal Australian Infantry Corps.
- The Reverend Raymond John Leonard Quirk, Chaplain, 4th Class (18086), Royal Australian Army Chaplains' Department.
- Captain Richard Thomas Willing (335112), Australian Staff Corps.

Royal Australian Air Force

- Flight Lieutenant Keith McIntyre Price (041580).
- Warrant Officer Colin David Kerr (A31604).
- Warrant Officer Alexander William Douglas McEachern (A3823).
- Warrant Officer Robert George Phillips (A32125).

Civil Division

- Jacob Aroi, of Nauru Island. For public services.
- Edna Louisa Bennett, of Whyalla, South Australia. For services to the community, particularly in connection with the welfare of migrants.
- Margaret Blackwood, Senior Lecturer, Department of Botany and Plant Physiology, University of Melbourne.
- Captain Albert Norman Boulton, Nautical Adviser, Marine Services Division, Department of Shipping and Transport, Melbourne.
- Albert John Bretag, a Member of the Lae Advisory Council, Territory of Papua and New Guinea.
- John Patrick Byrne, JP, of Highett, Victoria. For services in the interests of ex-servicemen.
- The Reverend Victor William Coombes, of Roseville, New South Wales. For social welfare services.
- Captain the Reverend John Samuel Cowland, of West Ryde, New South Wales. For services to the community, particularly as founder of the Church Army in Australia.
- Richard Joseph Patrick Daffy, Assistant Commissioner (Legislation), Repatriation Commission, Melbourne.
- Captain Clive Campbell Forman, of Ivanhoe, Victoria. For services to civil aviation.
- Bruce Hugh Garnsey, National Commissioner for Training, Australian Boy Scouts' Association.
- Sydney John Griffith. For public services, particularly as Master of the Australian Department of Shipping and Transport's Lighthouse Supply Vessels.
- Aubrey Wilfred Donald Hodgson, Honorary New South Wales State Secretary of the Naval Association of Australia.
- Charles Bernard Jenkins, Director of Social Services, Sydney.
- Keith Ormond Edley Johnson, of Mosman, New South Wales. For services to cricket.
- Patrick Gerald Kennedy, lately Senior Investigation Officer, Grade 2, Income Tax Office, Victoria.
- Ernest Clarence Boyd Langfield, of Darwin, Northern Territory. For services to the rice-growing industry.
- Clara Crofton Margin, President of the Gosford Branch of the Australian Red Cross Society.
- Harold Gibson Neil, local Representative of the Australian Stevedoring Industry Authority, Melbourne.
- Joseph Wesley Nichols, of Alice Springs, Northern Territory. For services to the community.
- Bernard James O'Brien, lately Director of Posts and Telegraphs, Queensland.
- John Barker Rodwell, JP, of Brunswick Heads, New South Wales. For services to the community, especially to ex-servicemen.
- Edward Fearnley Rowntree, Principal Executive Officer, Hobart Rivulet Flood Protection Authority.
- Minna Helena Schultz, of Albury, New South Wales. For services to the community.
- Amelia Nellie Shankelton, of Darwin, Northern Territory. For social welfare services.
- Sextus Edward Sutcliffe, of Rosslyn Park, South Australia. For services to civil aviation.
- Neil Thomson, lately Public Service Commissioner for the Territory of Papua and New Guinea.
- Dorothy Edna Waterhouse, President of the Australian Mothercraft Society.
- Ahiona Alice Wedega, of Milne Bay, Territory of Papua and New Guinea. For services to the community, especially in the development of women's, activities.
- Ida May Wenzel, of Toorak, Victoria. For services to the community.
- Lawrence Edward Young. For public services, especially as Honorary Treasurer of the Royal Horticultural Society of New South Wales.
- Hilda Georgina Zinner, Commandant, Australian Red Cross Society, attached to Headquarters, Australian Army Force, Far East Land Forces, 1959–1962.

=== Companion of the Imperial Service Order (ISO) ===
Australian Civil Service

- Clifford Charles Green, lately Deputy Commissioner of Taxation, New South Wales.
- John Noble Core Rogers, lately Commonwealth Surveyor-General, Department of the Interior, Canberra.

=== British Empire Medal (BEM) ===
Military Division

Royal Australian Navy

- Chief Petty Officer Alan Trevor Adams, DSM, R 35344.
- Chief Dental Mechanic Albert Gerard Heesh, R 23764.
- Sergeant First Class James William Mumford, DSM, R 19104, Naval Dockyard Police.

Australian Army

- 1259 Corporal Henry Alexander Cockram, Royal Australian Army Provost Corps.
- 52301 Sergeant Gordon Eggington, Royal Australian Army Medical Corps.
- F.45028 Warrant Officer Class II (temporary) Juanity Cecily Feltham, Women's Royal Australian Army Corps.
- 155665 Sergeant Charles Jagerndorff, Royal Australian Army Medical Corps.
- 27228 Sergeant Kevin Edward Kludas, Royal Australian Armoured Corps.
- 210643 Sergeant (temporary) Eric Rodger Sadler, Royal Australian Infantry Corps.

Royal Australian Air Force

- A.21042 Flight Sergeant Kevin Maxwell Clayton.
- A.1693 Flight Sergeant Aubrey Ray Currey.
- A.39029 Sergeant Leslie Edward John Young.

Civil Division

- Neville Joseph Collins. For services to Antarctic research and exploration.
- Eleanor Crawford, Hostess, YWCA Recreation Centre, Bonegilla, Victoria.
- Dorothy Elma Harvey, Assistant to the Registrar, Australian National University, Canberra.
- Kathleen Winifred Lenihan, Private Secretary to the Speaker of the House of Representatives.
- Thomas Murray, Senior Constable, Long Range Patrol, Maralinga.

=== Air Force Cross (AFC) ===
- Group Captain Peter Avison Parker, DFC.
- Squadron Leader Warren Stickley (022185).
- Flight Lieutenant William Darcy John Monaghan (021625).
- Flight Lieutenant Lyle Arthur Partridge (022007).

=== Queen's Commendation for Valuable Service in the Air ===
- Squadron Leader Henry Alfred Hughes, DFC (021144).
- Flight Lieutenant Frank John Daniel (037560).
- Flight Lieutenant Peter John Scully (025033).

== Sierra Leone ==
=== Order of the British Empire ===
==== Commander of the Order of the British Empire (CBE) ====
Civil Division

- The Honourable Ahmad Wurie, MBE, Minister of Education.

==== Officer of the Order of the British Empire (OBE) ====
Military Division

- Colonel David Lansana, 1st Battalion, The Royal Sierra Leone Regiment.

Civil Division

- Walter Wilkinson Wallace, DSC, formerly Development Secretary, Ministry of Development.
- Alfred Ellington Olu-Williams, FRCS, LRCP, Senior Surgeon Specialist, Ministry of Health.

==== Member of the Order of the British Empire (MBE) ====
Civil Division

- Percy Richmond Davies, Official Administrator and Registrar-General.
- Joseph Thomas Ganda, JP, Headmaster, Catholic Boys' School, Serabu, Southern Province.
- Joseph Ransford Jarrett-Yaskey, Chief Architect, Ministry of Works.

=== British Empire Medal (BEM) ===
Military Division

- 142035 Sergeant Mara Bangali, Royal Sierra Leone Military Forces.

== Jamaica ==
=== Order of the British Empire ===
==== Officer of the Order of the British Empire (OBE) ====
Civil Division

- Roy Olivier Cooke, MD, Senior Medical Officer, Bellevue Hospital.

==== Member of the Order of the British Empire (MBE) ====
Military Division

- Major Geoffrey William Preston-Jones, Jamaica Defence Force.

Civil Division

- Lucille Abrahams. For social welfare services.
- Marjory Elizabeth Miller. For social welfare services, particularly on behalf of the Jamaica Branch of the British Red Cross Society.
- Aston Rupert Taylor, Manager of the Government Savings Bank.

=== Companion of the Imperial Service Order (ISO) ===
Jamaica Civil Service

- John Livingston Taylor, Government Printer.

=== British Empire Medal (BEM) ===
Military Division

- Sergeant George Milford Christian, Jamaica Defence Force.
- Corporal Francis Nathanial Moore, 3rd Battalion, Jamaica Regiment (National Reserve).
- Colour Sergeant Ferdinand Vivian Morris, 1st Battalion, Jamaica Regiment.

Civil Division

- Noel Rodriques Jackson, Operator Mechanical Unit Class I, Public Works Department.
- Iris Palmer, Matron, Children's Hospital, Montego Bay.

=== Queen's Police Medal (QPM) ===
- Wilton Sylvester Ashley, MBE, Assistant Commissioner of Police, Jamaica.
