= Francis James Ralph =

British World War I ace (1892–1918)

- Born: 9 December 1892; Cheltenham, Gloucestershire, England
- Died: 3 September 1918 (aged 25); Pas-de-Calais, France (KIA)
- Burial place: Villers-Bretonneux Military Cemetery, Somme, France; 49°53′13″N 2°30′43″E
- Military career
- Allegiance: United Kingdom
- Branch: British Army; Royal Air Force
- Service years: 1915–1918
- Rank: Second Lieutenant
- Unit: No. 20 Squadron RAF
- Awards: Distinguished Flying Cross

Second Lieutenant Francis James Ralph DFC (9 December 1892 – 3 September 1918) was a British World War I ace credited with 13 confirmed aerial victories over German fighter aircraft while flying as an aerial observer.

== Early life ==
Francis James Ralph was born in Cheltenham on 9 December 1892. After completion of his education, and his marriage, he worked as a draughtsman for the Co-op Gas Company in Thurlaston, Leicestershire, from 1910 until his enlistment in 1915.

== Military career ==
From cadet he was appointed a temporary second lieutenant (on probation) on 12 February 1918, on the General List to serve in the Royal Flying Corps. He was confirmed in his rank as an observer officer on 27 May, by which time the Army's Royal Flying Corps and the Royal Naval Air Service had merged to form the Royal Air Force. By then Ralph was already serving as a gunner/observer in the rear seat of a Bristol F.2 Fighter in No. 20 Squadron, as on 9 May, flying with pilot Lieutenant David Smith, he had gained his first victory, shooting down in flames a Fokker Dr.I west of Lille. The next day, he was wounded in action; his pilot flew him back to base.

He then went on to fly with a number of pilots. On 31 May, he and Lieutenant Leslie Capel destroyed an Albatros D.V north of Laventie. Then, flying with Lieutenant William Thomson, he destroyed a Pfalz D.III over Comines–Houthem on 9 June, and drove down out of control a Fokker D.VII over Boezinge on 17 June, a victory shared with Captain Dennis Latimer & Lieutenant Tom Noel. On 26 June, for his fifth victory, which made him an ace, he drove down a Pfalz D.III over Armentières with Lieutenant Paul Iaccaci. From then on all his victories were made with Captain Horace Lale in the pilot's seat. They scored two Fokker D.VII's north of Comines on 25 July, one shared with Lieutenant Thomson & Sergeant D. D. C. Summers and Lieutenants Smith & John Hills, and on 14 August drove down a Fokker D.VII over Dadizele. Late on 21 August they accounted for a Pfalz D.III, then an Albatros D.V, and two Fokker D.VII north-east of Geluwe, the first Fokker being shared with Captain Latimer & Sergeant Arthur Newland and Lieutenant John Colbert & 2nd Lieutenant Harold Edwards. Ralph's 13th and final victory came on 3 September, driving down a Fokker D.VII south of Havrincourt Wood. However, he was killed in this combat. His pilot, Horace Percy Lale, carried his body back to base.

Francis James Ralph's award of the Distinguished Flying Cross was gazetted posthumously on 2 November 1918. His citation read:

Distinguished Flying Cross
Second Lieutenant Francis James Ralph.

"A brave and skilful observer who has taken part in many combats with enemy aircraft, invariably displaying cool courage and presence of mind. On a recent occasion our patrol of eleven machines, after bombing a railway junction, was attacked by fifteen enemy scouts. One of these, which was engaged by this officer's pilot, crumpled and fell. The formation was then attacked by seven Fokkers from above, one of which was shot down by 2nd Lt. Ralph."

Ralph was originally buried in the Cemetery of the Military Hospital at Dury, near Amiens, but in 1927 his remains were exhumed and re-interred at the Military Cemetery at Villers-Bretonneux.
