= Dennis Latimer =

British flying ace (1895–1976)

- Born: 31 August 1895; Withington, Shropshire, England
- Died: 12 January 1976 (aged 80); Middlesex, England
- Military career
- Allegiance: United Kingdom
- Branch: British Army; Royal Air Force
- Service years: 1917–1919
- Rank: Captain
- Unit: No. 20 Squadron RFC/RAF
- Conflicts: World War I; Western Front
- Awards: Military Cross; Distinguished Flying Cross

Captain Dennis Latimer MC, DFC (31 August 1895 – 12 January 1976) was a British World War I flying ace notable for achieving twenty-eight aerial victories, all against enemy fighter aircraft.

== Early life ==
Latimer was born in Withington, Shropshire, to James Davies and Ida Lottie Latimer. By 1901 the family was residing in Towyn, Merionethshire, Wales, where his father was a hotel proprietor.

== World War I ==
Latimer was commissioned from cadet to temporary second lieutenant (on probation) for duty in the Royal Flying Corps on 26 January 1917, and was appointed a flying officer on 27 April. In early 1918 he was posted to No. 20 Squadron RFC to fly a Bristol F.2b two-seater fighter. Latimer scored his first victory on 13 March with Lieutenant James Scaramanga as his observer/gunner, the only one he scored in the Royal Flying Corps. On 1 April 1918, the Army's Royal Flying Corps was merged with the Royal Naval Air Service to form the Royal Air Force. Latimer was then paired with Lieutenant Tom Noel, gaining his second victory on 21 April. Latimer and Noel gained another 13 victories between 8 and 20 May, and on 25 May Latimer was appointed a flight commander with the temporary rank of captain. Latimer and Noel gained nine more victories in June and July, and in August Latimer and Sergeant Arthur Newland gained five more. However, on 22 August, Latimer was again flying with Noel, when they were shot down by Leutnant Willi Nebgen of Jasta 7. Noel was killed and Latimer captured. Latimer's final total claimed in conjunction with his gunners was one aircraft captured, seventeen destroyed (including one shared), and ten 'out of control' wins (two shared), making him the highest-scoring ace of No. 20 Squadron.

Latimer was subsequently awarded the Military Cross which was gazetted on 13 September. His citation read:

Temporary Lieutenant Dennis Latimer, RAF.

"For conspicuous gallantry and devotion to duty on offensive patrol. He and his observer in four days' fighting destroyed seven enemy machines and drove down three. They did magnificent service."

A week later his award of the Distinguished Flying Cross was published, the citation reading:

Lieutenant (Temporary Captain) Dennis Latimer, MC.

"When leading an offensive patrol this officer displayed great skill and bravery. Having shot down a scout in flames, he immediately engaged a second, which he destroyed after a short combat. In addition, he has accounted for four other machines."

Latimer was eventually repatriated following the armistice, and was transferred to the RAF's unemployed list on 10 April 1919.

== List of aerial victories ==
Combat record
No.	Date/Time	Aircraft/ Serial No.	Opponent	Result	Location	Notes
1	13 March 1918 @ 1255	Bristol F.2b (C4615)	Albatros D.V	Out of control	Comines—Wervicq	Observer: 2nd Lt. James Scaramanga.
2	21 April 1918 @ 1110	Bristol F.2b (B1232)	Albatros D.V	Out of control	North of Wervicq	Observer: Lt. Tom Noel.
3	8 May 1918 @ 1320	Bristol F.2b (C856)	Albatros D.V	Destroyed in flames	South-east of Wervicq	Observer: Lt. Tom Noel.
4	8 May 1918 @ 1640	Bristol F.2b (C856)	Fokker Dr.I	Destroyed in flames	Comines—Wervicq	Observer: Lt. Tom Noel.
5	8 May 1918 @ 1640	Bristol F.2b (C856)	Fokker Dr.I	Out of control	Comines—Wervicq	Observer: Lt. Tom Noel.
6	8 May 1918 @ 1640	Bristol F.2b (C856)	Fokker Dr.I	Out of control	Comines—Wervicq	Observer: Lt. Tom Noel.
7	14 May 1918 @ 1845–1850	Bristol F.2b (C856)	Albatros D.V	Destroyed	Wervicq	Observer: Lt. Tom Noel.
8	14 May 1918 @ 1845–1850	Bristol F.2b (C856)	Albatros D.V	Captured	Zillebeke	Observer: Lt. Tom Noel.
9	15 May 1918 @ 1045–1115	Bristol F.2b (C856)	Pfalz D.III	Out of control	North-west of Lille	Observer: Lt. Tom Noel.
10	15 May 1918 @ 1045–1115	Bristol F.2b (C856)	Fokker Dr.I	Destroyed	Comines—Ypres	Observer: Lt. Tom Noel.
11	18 May 1918 @ 0700	Bristol F.2b (C856)	Pfalz D.III	Destroyed	Comines	Observer: Lt. Tom Noel.
12	18 May 1918 @ 1140	Bristol F.2b (C856)	Pfalz D.III	Destroyed	North-east of Nieppe Forest	Observer: Lt. Tom Noel.
13	18 May 1918 @ 1140	Bristol F.2b (C856)	Pfalz D.III	Out of control	Merville	Observer: Lt. Tom Noel.
14	20 May 1918 @ 1130–1135	Bristol F.2b (C856)	Albatros D.V	Destroyed in flames	North-east of Merville	Observer: Lt. Tom Noel.
15	20 May 1918 @ 1130–1135	Bristol F.2b (C856)	Albatros D.V	Destroyed	Coucou Aerodrome	Observer: Lt. Tom Noel.
16	1 June 1918 @ 0630	Bristol F.2b (C892)	Pfalz D.III	Destroyed	Comines	Observer: Lt. Tom Noel.
17	9 June 1918 @ 0915	Bristol F.2b (C892)	Pfalz D.III	Destroyed	Comines	Observer: Lt. Tom Noel.
18	17 June 1918 @ 0745	Bristol F.2b (C987)	Fokker D.VII	Out of control	Boesinghe	Observer: Lt. Tom Noel. Shared with Lt. William Thomson & 2nd Lt. F. J. Ralphs.
19	30 June 1918 @ 0730	Bristol F.2b (C987)	Pfalz D.III	Destroyed	Comines	Observer: Lt. Tom Noel.
20	1 July 1918 @ 1845	Bristol F.2b (C987)	Fokker Dr.I	Out of control	Menin	Observer: Lt. Tom Noel.
21	14 July 1918 @ 0900	Bristol F.2b (C987)	Fokker D.VII	Out of control	South-east of Ypres	Observer: Lt. Tom Noel.
22	14 July 1918 @ 0900	Bristol F.2b (C987)	Fokker D.VII	Out of control	South-east of Ypres	Observer: Lt. Tom Noel. Shared with Lt. August Iaccaci & 2nd Lt. Ronald Turner.
23	19 July 1918 @ 0845	Bristol F.2b (C987)	Fokker D.VII	Destroyed	North of Comines	Observer: Lt. Tom Noel.
24	14 August 1918 @ 1800–1830	Bristol F.2b (D7993)	Pfalz D.III	Destroyed	Dadizeele	Observer: Sgt. Arthur Newland.
25	14 August 1918 @ 1800–1830	Bristol F.2b (D7993)	Pfalz D.III	Destroyed	Dadizeele	Observer: Sgt. Arthur Newland.
26	21 August 1918 @ 1910–1915	Bristol F.2b (D7993)	Pfalz D.III	Destroyed	Menin	Observer: Sgt. Arthur Newland.
27	21 August 1918 @ 1910–1915	Bristol F.2b (D7993)	Pfalz D.III	Destroyed	Dadizeele	Observer: Sgt. Arthur Newland.
28	21 August 1918 @ 1910–1915	Bristol F.2b (D7993)	Pfalz D.III	Destroyed	Gheluwe	Observer: Sgt. Arthur Newland. Shared with Capt. Horace Lale & 2nd Lt. F. J. Ralphs.

== Bibliography ==
- Guttman, Jon & Dempsey, Harry (2007). Bristol F2 Fighter Aces of World War I. Oxford, UK: Osprey Publishing. ISBN 978-1-84603-201-1.
- Shores, Christopher F.; Franks, Norman & Guest, Russell F. (1990). Above the Trenches: a Complete Record of the Fighter Aces and Units of the British Empire Air Forces 1915–1920. London, UK: Grub Street. ISBN 978-0-948817-19-9.
