= Harold Leslie Edwards =

Canadian World War I flying ace

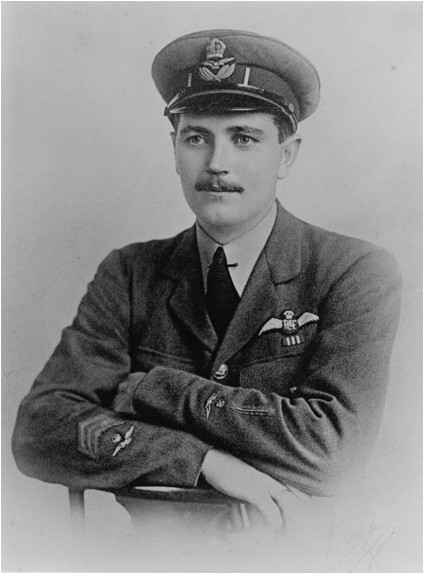
- Harold Leslie Edwards DFC MM
- Born: 28 April 1893; Franktown, Ontario, Canada
- Died: 15 June 1951 (aged 58); Toronto, Ontario, Canada
- Military career
- Allegiance: George V
- Branch: Infantry; Royal Air Force
- Rank: 2nd Lieutenant
- Units: 130th (Lanark and Renfrew) Battalion, CEF, 38th (Ottawa) Battalion, CEF, No. 20 Squadron RAF
- Awards: Distinguished Flying Cross (DFC), Military Medal (MM)
- Other work: Car salesman

Harold Leslie Edwards DFC MM (28 April 1893 – 15 June 1951) was a Canadian World War I flying ace gunner, who in conjunction with his pilots, was officially credited with 21 victories.

== Early life ==
Edwards was the son of Joseph Harold Edwards and Ellen Keays; he was born in Franktown, Ontario on 28 April 1893. When he enlisted in the 130th Battalion, CEF on 16 December 1915 at Perth, Ontario, he was five feet eleven inches tall, weighed 168 pounds, and was swarthy with dark blue eyes. He gave his profession as chauffeur and auto mechanic. As was customary for Canadians in those days, he swore allegiance to the King of England, and contracted to serve for the duration of the war.

== Infantry career ==
He embarked to England on the troopship SS Lapland, arriving in October 1916, and serving with the 38th Battln. CEF and received a field promotion to corporal in November 1916, before being wounded on 8 April 1917. Edwards was transferred to No 3 Canadian General Hospital in Boulogne with what was reported as shrapnel or gunshot wounds to the leg and shoulder. He was evacuated to England and taken on strength at the Endell Street Military Hospital, Seaforth on 12 April 1917. Edwards was then transferred to the Canadian Convalescent Hospital at Bromley, Kent. He was awarded the Military Medal on 26 May 1917.

== Aviation career ==
Discharged from the CEF in June 1918, Edwards enlisted in the RAF. He was promoted to 2nd Lieutenant as an observer and joined No. 20 Squadron on 28 July 1918, flying in Bristol F.2 Fighters. Pilots Edwards flew in action with include aces Paul Iaccaci and Captain Horace Percy Lale, Lt. William McKenzie Thomson, and Capt. Geoffrey Hooper.

He was wounded in the lung on 21 October 1918 and returned to Canada on the S.S. Minnedosa in January 1919 and spent considerable time in St. Andrews Military Hospital in Toronto.

Of his total 21 claims, 19 were in one month (September 1918). He was awarded the Distinguished Flying Cross.

His war time tally consisted of 18 enemy Fokker D.VII airplanes destroyed (including one shared victory), and 3 more Fokkers driven down out of control.

== Postwar ==
Edwards went on the unemployed list of the RAF effective 1 June 1919. After the war, Edwards became a car salesman. He lived in the Toronto area for the rest of his life and died in 1951. He is buried in Franktown.

== Text of citations ==
=== Distinguished Flying Cross ===
2nd Lieut. Harold Edwards. (FRANCE) When on offensive patrol, during 16 September, this officer with nine other machines, engaged twelve enemy scouts. In the combat that ensued he destroyed one, his pilot accounting for a second, and they took part in destroying a third. In all 2nd Lieutenant Edwards has accounted for nine enemy machines, setting an excellent example of gallantry worthy of high praise.

— Supplement to The London Gazette, 3 December, 1918, page 14320

=== Military Medal ===
For conspicuous gallantry on early morning of 26 March 1917 near SOUCHEZ. The enemy blew a camouflet at 5.20 a.m. and broke into one of our Mining Shafts. The force of the explosion burst in the sides of a dug-out near one of the Mine Galleries. Twenty men were in the dug-out when the explosion occurred. Three of these managed to make their way out but the remainder were unable to gain the surface. About a dozen men were standing in the trench near the dug-out entrance, amongst whom were CPL. RAINFORD, SGT. BRISCOE, PTES. EDWARDS and CAREY. These men, without consideration of their own safety, and also having seen the gas flame rush from the mouth of the dug-out, singeing the hair and burning the faces of some, entered the dug-out and succeeded in bringing 10 men to the surface. The remaining seven men were found to be killed. These men assisted in the work of resuscitation of those overcome by gas. The men rescued were badly burned and gassed and must have been overcome by fumes but for the prompt and gallant action of these men. Some of the rescuers themselves were badly affected by the gas. These four men have been selected from the rescuers as being those who rendered the best services. Their prompt and gallant action undoubtedly saved the loss of 10 of their comrades and it is considered that they are fully deserving of an Immediate Reward. (A.F.B. 3121. April 18, 1917).

— War Diary for the month of March 1917 of the 38th Canadians, pages 5 and 6 (the names of the rescuers are not stated)

There exists some confusion regarding the awarding of the Military Medal to this man. The action cited on his Medal Card for the action on March 26, 1917, refers to him as Private Edwards though he had been a corporal since November 23, 1916. A publication of Kingswood House in Dulwich, which was leased by Massey-Harris for convalescing Canadian soldiers, the Kingswood Bulletin, cites the following action:

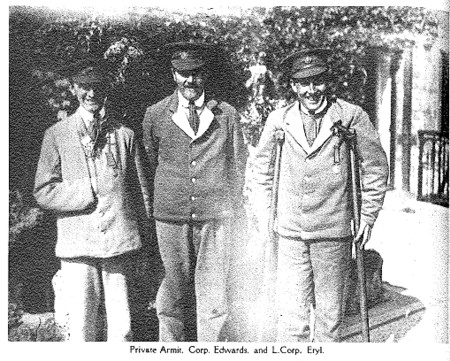
Private Armir, Corp. Edwards, and L.Corp. Eryl at Kingswood House

More Honours For Kingswood Men One of the most interesting items in the programme at our Empire Day fete, was the presentation of Medals won for distinguished conduct at the Front, by three of our patients. The Distinguished Conduct Medal was awarded to 107065, Private T. N. Armit, of the 2nd C.M.R.’s, and the Military Medal to 787002, Corporal H. L. Edwards, of the 38th Battalion, and to 18421, Lance-Corporal V. Eryl, of the 52nd Battalion. Mrs. Raynolds, on pinning the coveted medals on the men’s breasts, in a few well-chosen words, expressed the pride and pleasure which all those connected with Kingswood experienced in having such brave men in the Home, and in hearing of their noble deeds. Needless to say, the three heroes of the day were very heartily cheered by their comrades. The brave deed which merited even a higher distinction for Corporal Edwards, is worthy of mention. During the desperate fighting at Vimy Ridge on the memorable ninth of April, the advance of his company was held up by a well-handled machine-gun and its crew of six Germans. The gun and its crew were well sheltered in a large shell crater, protected in front by barbed wire entanglements. Five separate attempts to advance in front and capture the gun were made by parties of volunteers, two at a time, but they fell one by one. Corporal Edwards and a comrade then worked their way round the flank, taking cover over the uneven shell-pitted ground, took the Germans by surprise, disposed of five by rifle, bayonet and revolver, and carried back the gun and the remaining German as a prisoner. Corporal Edwards and his comrade immediately made good use of the captured machine gun against other bodies of German troops. Corporal Edwards hails from Smiths’ Falls, his father is Major Edwards of the 240th Battalion, and his uncle is a Captain in the same Battalion. He also has a brother a Sergeant in the Canadian Army—truly a fine family record.

— Kingswood Bulletin, page 2.

== DFC citation ==
Whilst on Offensive Patrol with 9 Bristol Fighters, 12 Fokker Bi-planes were attacked on the same level over ST.QUENTIN. About 8 more E.A. joined the fight from above. These however were attacked by a formation of Dolphins which was above the E.A. A dog fight ensued, which ended in all the E.A. being either brought down or driven away. The Leader of the Bristol Fighter formation, Machine No. E2154 (Pilot – Lt.Thomson. Observer – 2/Lt.Edwards) dived on 1 E.A. firing about 100 rounds at close range. This E.A. suddenly spun slowly down and crashed in some trenches N.E. of ST.QUENTIN. Lt.Thomson then saw another E.A. falling past him, obviously out of control, and, diving on it, fired about 100 rounds at point blank range. This E.A. had been attacked by Machine No. C951 (Pilot – Lt.Strachan. Observer 2/Lt.Calderwood) who started it in its spin and eventually saw it crash N.W. of ST.QUENTIN. 2/Lt/Edwards (observer in Machine No.E2154, Pilot – Lt.Thomson) fired about 200 rounds with double guns at an E.A. which was diving on a Bristol Fighter on his right. The E.A. fell over and over and hit the ground near ST.QUENTIN. This is confirmed by Lt.Boulton, Pilot in Machine No. E2493. Lt.Iaccaci, DFC. And Sergt.Howland, DFM., in Machine No.E2213 found themselves under a Fokker Bi-plane and the Observer fired nearly a whole drum at it. Lt.H.E.Johnston and 2/Lt.E.S.Harvey in Machine No.C4718 were attacked by an E.A. from below. Lt.Harvey fired two bursts at this E.A. which spun slowly down but was not watched all the way. This is confirmed by Lt.Iaccaci (sub-leader of Lt.Johnston’s formation). Machine C951 (Pilot – Lt.Strachan, Observer –2/Lt.Calderwood) was attacked by five E.A. on the same level, three of which were engaged by the Observer, who put about 100 rounds into one, at 150 yards range; this E.A turned off and dived down, leaving a heavy trail of black smoke and eventually crashed near OMISSY. A second E.A. was sent down in a slow spin over ST.QUENTIN, but could not be watched to the ground. The remainder of the E.A. broke off the fight. The leader of Patrol in E2154 (Pilot – Lt.Thomson, Observer – 2/Lt.Edwards) was attacked from below and from the side and the Observer got in about 100 rounds at 50 yards range at one trying to get under the tail. This E.A. went down out of control and was seen to crash near OMISSY. Another E.A. was driven down out of control by the Pilot, but could not be watched to the ground. (Signed) W.M.Thomson. Lieut. (Signed) H.L.Edwards. 2nd/Lieut.
