= Ronald William Turner =

English World War I flying ace

- Born: 17 November 1896; York, Yorkshire, England
- Military career
- Allegiance: United Kingdom
- Branch: British Army; Royal Air Force
- Service years: 1914–1920
- Rank: Lieutenant
- Units: Royal Engineers; Yorkshire Regiment; No. 20 Squadron RAF
- Conflicts: World War I • Western Front
- Awards: Distinguished Flying Cross

Lieutenant Ronald William Turner DFC, was an English World War I flying ace. He was credited with nine aerial victories while flying as an observer/gunner in two-seater fighters.

== Early life ==
Ronald William Turner was born in York, England, on 17 November 1897. He worked for five years as a joiner and carpenter prior to enlisting in 1914 to serve in World War I.

== World War I ==
Turner served in the Royal Engineers as a lance corporal, until selected for officer training, and was commissioned as a temporary second lieutenant in the Yorkshire Regiment on 27 June 1917.

Turner transferred to the Royal Flying Corps in December 1917, and was appointed an aerial observer on 27 April 1918. Posted to No. 20 Squadron to crew a Bristol F.2b two-seater fighter, his first aerial victory came on 18 May 1918 with pilot Lieutenant John Henry Colbert. Turner was flying with Lieutenant Paul Iaccaci on 4 July when they shot down three enemy fighters, and they gained two further victories on 10 and 14 July. Turner then returned to flying with Colbert for his final two victories on 24 and 29 July. On 9 August 1918, he was medically evacuated to a London hospital.

He was rewarded for his valour with the Distinguished Flying Cross on 4 November 1918. His award citation short-changed him when it read:

2nd Lieutenant (Temporary Lieutenant) Ronald William Turner (Yorkshire Regiment)

"A skilful and determined observer who in recent operations has shot down six enemy machines, accounting for two Albatross scouts in one flight."

He was subsequently promoted to temporary lieutenant, with seniority from 27 December 1918. Upon recovery, he would serve at the School of Air Gunnery to the end of the year, and at the 50th Training Depot Station in early 1919.

=== List of aerial victories ===
Combat record
No.	Date/Time	Aircraft/ Serial No.	Opponent	Result	Location	Notes
1	18 May 1918 @ 1140	Bristol F.2b (B1168)	Pfalz D.III	Destroyed	North of Neuf-Berquin	Pilot: Lieutenant John Henry Colbert
2	4 July 1918 @ 1620–1640	Bristol F.2b (C951)	Albatros D.V	Destroyed	West of Veldhoek	Pilot: Lieutenant Paul Iaccaci
3	4 July 1918 @ 1620–1640	Bristol F.2b (C951)	Albatros D.V	Driven down out of control	West of Veldhoek	Pilot: Lieutenant Paul Iaccaci
4	4 July 1918 @ 1620–1640	Bristol F.2b (C951)	Albatros D.V	Destroyed	Northeast of Zillebeke Lake	Pilot: Lieutenant Paul Iaccaci
5	10 July 1918 @ 0920	Bristol F.2b (D7919)	Fokker D.VII	Destroyed	East of Zillebeke Lake	Pilot: Lieutenant Paul Iaccaci
6	10 July 1918 @ 0920	Bristol F.2b (D7919)	Fokker D.VII	Driven down out of control	East of Zillebeke Lake	Pilot: Lieutenant Paul Iaccaci
7	14 July 1918 @ 0900	Bristol F.2b	Fokker D.VII	Driven down out of control	Southeast of Ypres	Pilot: Lieutenant Paul Iaccaci. Shared with Captain Dennis Latimer and Lieutenant Tom Cecil Noel.
8	24 July 1918 @ 2000	Bristol F.2b (D7951)	Fokker D.VII	Destroyed	North of Comines	Pilot: Lieutenant John Colbert
9	29 July 1918 @ 2010	Bristol F.2b (D7951)	Fokker D.VII	Destroyed	Northwest of Wervicq	Pilot: Lieutenant John Colbert

== Post-war ==
On 1 June 1919, he was transferred to the unemployed list of the Royal Air Force, and relinquished his commission in the Yorkshire Regiment on 1 December 1920, retaining the rank of lieutenant.
