= George Randall (RAF officer) =

British World War I flying ace

- Born: George Ebben Randall; 19 January 1899; Manor Park, London, England
- Died: 12 April 1955 (aged 56); Melbourne, Victoria, Australia
- Military career
- Allegiance: United Kingdom
- Branch: British Army; Royal Air Force; Royal Australian Air Force
- Service years: 1917–1922; 1939–1948
- Rank: Squadron Leader
- Units: No. 3 Squadron RFC; No. 20 Squadron RAF; Australian Air Force Reserve
- Conflicts: World War I; Western Front; First Waziristan Campaign; World War II
- Awards: Distinguished Flying Cross & Bar; Croix de Guerre

Squadron Leader George Ebben Randall DFC* (19 January 1899 – 12 April 1955) was a British World War I flying ace credited with eleven aerial victories.

== Early life ==
George Ebben Randall was born in 1899 in London.

== World War I ==
Randall joined the Royal Flying Corps as a cadet, and was commissioned as a temporary second lieutenant (on probation) on 4 April 1917, being appointed a flying officer (observer) and confirmed in his rank on 15 July, with seniority from 17 May. He served for some time in No. 3 Squadron RFC as an observer/gunner, before training as a pilot, being promoted to lieutenant, finally being appointed a flying officer on 20 May 1918.

He was then posted to No. 20 Squadron RAF, flying the Bristol F.2 Fighter, and shot down eleven German fighter aircraft between 24 July and 10 November 1918. His last two victories, on the day before the Armistice, won him a Distinguished Flying Cross. His observer/gunners included Sergeant Arthur Ernest Newland. Randall's final tally was seven enemy planes destroyed, four driven down out of control.

Randall's DFC was gazetted on 7 February 1919. His citation read:

Lieutenant George Ebben Randall.

"A brave and resourceful flight commander who has, within the last four months previous to November 11th, led 71 offensive patrols. On 10th November, engaging a superior number of enemy aircraft, he himself shot down two, and the remainder were driven off by his flight. In addition to the foregoing he has four other enemy machines to his credit."

== Interwar ==
On 1 August 1919, Randall was a granted permanent commission in the RAF with the rank of flying officer. On 9 July 1920, he was awarded a Bar to his DFC, for his part in operations in Waziristan.

Randall then appears to have run into financial difficulties, as on 6 July 1922, while serving at RAF Uxbridge, he was declared bankrupt. He resigned his commission on 22 November 1922.

== Second World War ==
Randall emigrated to Australia, where in December 1939, at age 40, he re-enlisted in the Royal Australian Air Force. He was posted to the General Duties Branch of the Citizen Air Force. He was promoted to Flight Lieutenant in 1940 and Squadron Leader in 1942. He served as a reserve officer until 1948.

== Bibliography ==
- Guttman, Jon (2007). Bristol F 2 Fighter Aces of World War I. Oxford, UK: Osprey Publishing. ISBN 978-1-84603-201-1.
- Shores, Christopher F.; Franks, Norman & Guest, Russell F. (1990). Above the Trenches: a Complete Record of the Fighter Aces and Units of the British Empire Air Forces 1915–1920. London, UK: Grub Street. ISBN 978-0-948817-19-9.
