= Geoffrey H. Hooper =

Australian World War I flying ace (1891-aft.1927)

Geoffrey Herbert Hooper
- Born: 15 April 1891; Sydney, Australia
- Died: After 13 June 1927
- Military career
- Allegiance: Australia
- Branch: Engineers; aviation
- Service years: 1915-1927
- Rank: Captain
- Units: Royal Engineers, No. 11 Squadron RFC, No. 20 Squadron RAF
- Conflicts: World War I
- Awards: Military Cross; Distinguished Flying Cross

Geoffrey Herbert Hooper was an Australian World War I flying ace credited with eleven aerial victories against German fighter planes.

== World War I ==
Hooper enlisted in the Royal Engineers on 1 November 1915. He transferred to the Royal Flying Corps in August 1916. He joined No. 11 Squadron RFC as pilot of a Bristol F.2 Fighter on 12 April 1917, three days before his 26th birthday. He scored his first victory on 26 June 1917. On 1 July 1917, Hooper was promoted to lieutenant. Eight days later, on 9 July 1917, he was raised to flight commander and temporary captain. He scored twice more while with 11 Squadron, the last on 11 September 1917, with Leslie Powell in the gunner's pit. Hooper then collected a Military Cross and transferred to No. 38 Squadron RFC on training duty for a rest.

He returned to combat with No. 20 Squadron RAF, and took up his winning ways there on 24 September 1918. With Harold Leslie Edwards manning the guns, he scored triple wins on 25 and 29 September, to become a double ace. On 10 November, he racked up his final victory, reaching six German fighters destroyed and five driven down out of control. He had also participated in many bombing raids, by both day and night.

== Post-war ==
On 8 May 1919, Hooper relinquished his commission upon completion of service but retained the rank of lieutenant. On 24 May, he transferred to the unemployed list of the Royal Air Force. He was awarded a Distinguished Flying Cross on 3 June.

On 12 December 1919, he gave up his commission in the Territorial Force Kent Fortress Engineers for a permanent commission in the Royal Air Force.

On 13 June 1923, he resigned his commission as a flight lieutenant. Also in 1923, he was commissioned as a captain in the Royal Australian Air Force.

On 13 June 1927, Hooper completed his service in the reserves.

== Recognition ==
- Military Cross - 2nd Lt. (T./Capt.) Geoffrey Herbert Hooper, R.E., attd. R.F.C. According to the London Gazette, Hooper was awarded the Military Cross "For conspicuous gallantry and devotion to duty. When leading a patrol of four machines, he attacked ten enemy aircraft; during the engagement five of them were destroyed, two by himself. He had previously led a very successful night bombing attack on an aerodrome, in unfavourable weather, dropping bombs from a very low altitude, and doing a great amount of damage. He has invariably displayed great gallantry and skill when engaged in aerial combats."
- Distinguished Flying Cross (DFC) - Awarded 3 June 1919.
