= James Scaramanga =

British World War I flying ace (1898–1918)

James John Scaramanga
- Born: 25 July 1898; Reigate, Surrey, England
- Died: 10 July 1918 (aged 19); France
- Burial place: Aire Communal Cemetery; Pas-de-Calais, France]
- Military career
- Allegiance: United Kingdom
- Branch: British Army; Royal Air Force
- Service years: 1916–1918
- Rank: Lieutenant
- Units: No. 20 Squadron Royal Flying Corps, No. 22 Squadron RAF

Lieutenant James John Scaramanga (25 July 1898 – 10 July 1918) was a First World War British ace credited with twelve aerial victories. He scored his last victory after he had already received the wound which would soon prove fatal. The observer ace hailed from a wealthy Greek family with a connection to James Bond series author Ian Fleming.

== Background ==
James John Scaramanga, son of John George Scaramanga and his wife Louisa Yeames Scaramanga, was born on 25 July 1898 in Reigate, Surrey. Some sources give an alternate place of birth, Redhill, Surrey. By 1901, he was living at Tiltwood House in Worth, West Sussex, with his extended family, including his paternal grandmother, Elizabeth 'Eliza' Franghiadi Scaramanga. Tiltwood House, a fifteen-bedroomed mansion on Tiltwood Estate, in Crawley Down, Worth, had been purchased and enlarged by his Greek grandfather George Emmanuel Scaramanga. By the time of his grandfather's death in 1897, Tiltwood Estate was nearly 500 acres. His grandmother died in 1933, and the estate passed on to James's uncle Ambrose Scaramanga. James's first cousin George Ambrose Scaramanga (1911–1988) is alleged to be the inspiration for the choice of name for the Scaramanga villain in Ian Fleming's The Man with the Golden Gun, published posthumously. Fleming and George Ambrose Scaramanga had been schoolmates at Eton College in the 1920s and had apparently had a falling out; Fleming later used Scaramanga's name for his villain as a way of taking revenge.

== Military career ==
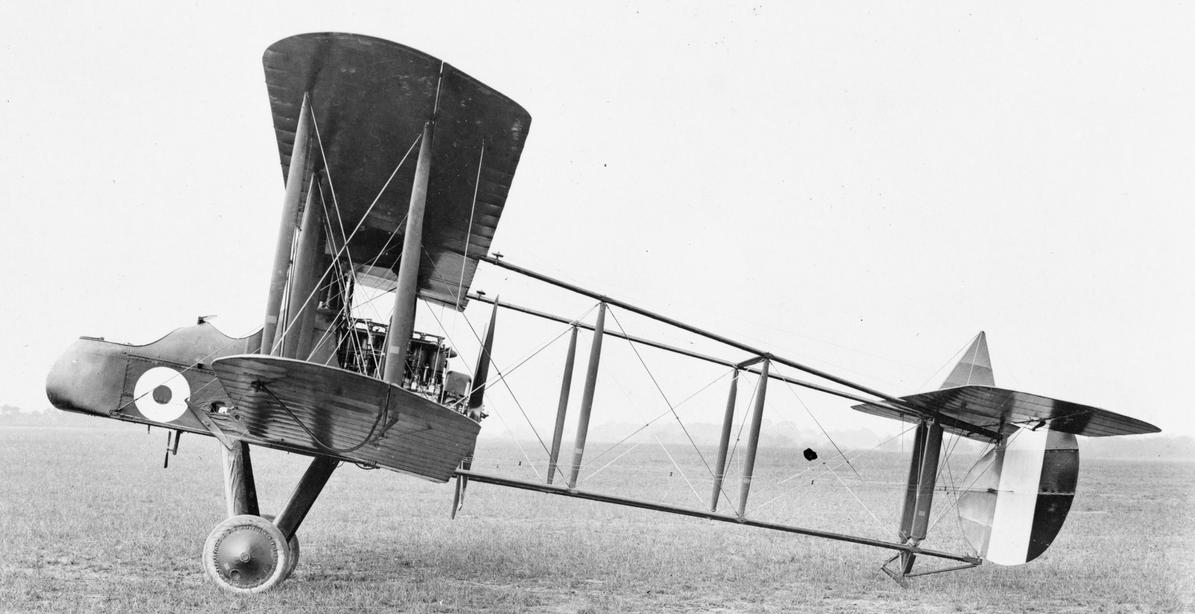
Scaramanga first flew in F.E.2 aircraft with No. 20 Squadron.

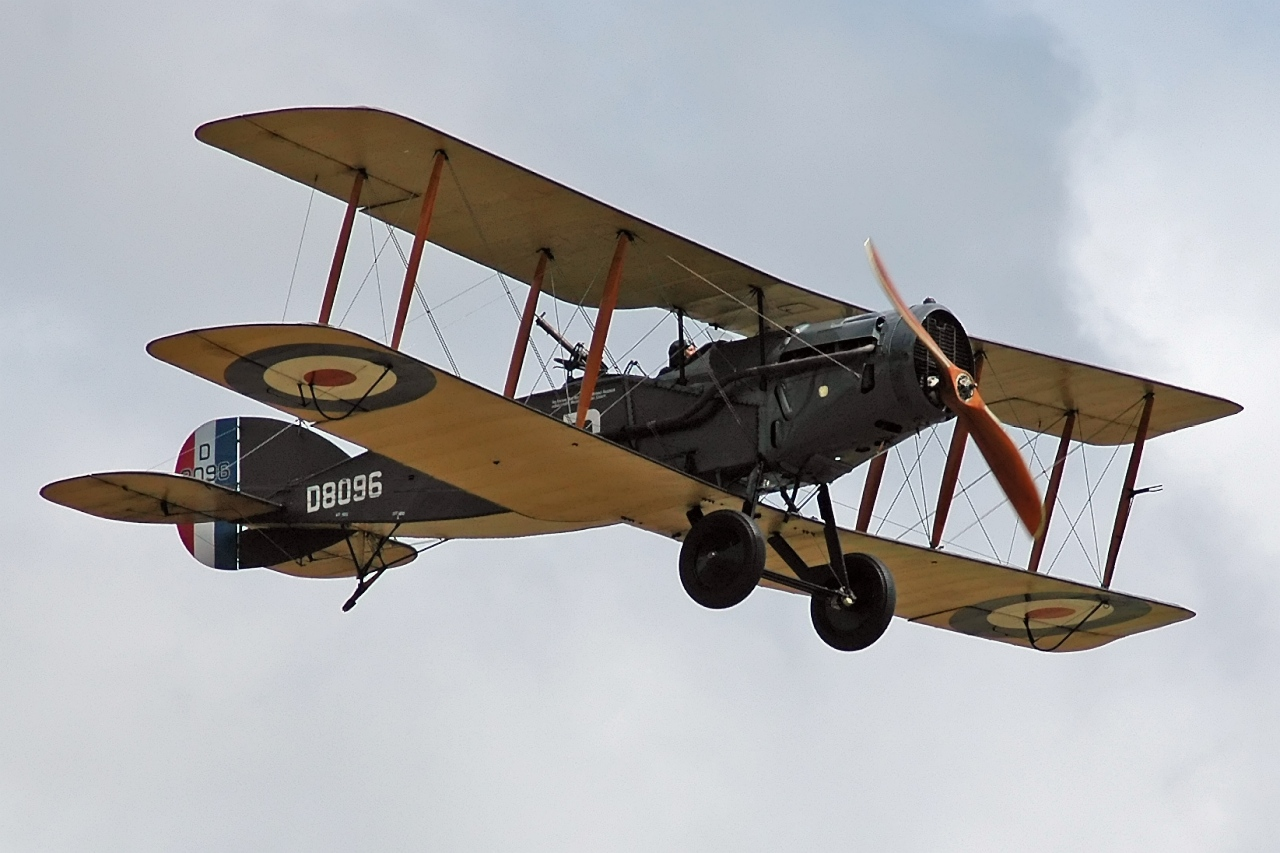
James Scaramanga was credited with all his victories while flying in a Bristol F.2b.

James Scaramanga was posted to the No. 20 Squadron of the Royal Flying Corps on 28 December 1916, as an observer, with the rank of second lieutenant effective the following day. He initially flew in F.E.2's with No. 20 Squadron. In August 1917, his squadron was equipped with Bristol Fighters. Scaramanga was credited with twelve aerial victories, all from the Bristol F.2b. Lieutenant Scaramanga scored his first aerial victory on 9 March 1918 when he, with Lieutenant Douglas Graham Cooke piloting Bristol F2.b (C4605), sent an Albatros D.V out of control south of Comines, Nord, France. He racked up another victory four days later, on 13 March 1918. From Bristol F.2b (C4615), he and pilot Lieutenant Dennis Latimer sent a Pfalz D.III out of control over Comines-Wervicq.

However, on 11 April 1918, both he and his pilot Canadian Major J. A. Dennistoun were seriously wounded. They were forced to land near Neuve-Église, Bas-Rhin, France under machine-gun ground fire, and Bristol (B1275) was destroyed. Lieutenant Scaramanga was posted to the No. 22 Squadron of the Royal Air Force on 6 June 1918, after he had recovered. All of his remaining victories (3 through 12) were with Lieutenant John Gurdon as his pilot. Also, his next seven victories (3 through 9) were all from Bristol F.2b (C989). On 19 June 1918, Lieutenant James Scaramanga scored a triple, taking out three Fokker D.VII aircraft southeast of Armentières, Nord, France. Two were destroyed, and a third sent out of control. On 27 June 1918, he sent a Fokker Dr.I out of control, again southeast of Armentières, his sixth victory.

Scaramanga racked up his seventh victory on 1 July 1918 when he sent a Pfalz D.III out of control over Armentières. He took out his eighth plane on 4 July 1918 when a Fokker D.VII was destroyed over Noyelles, north of Seclin, Nord. The lieutenant's ninth victory involved a DFW C destroyed north of La Bassée, Nord. Scaramanga's last three victories (10 through 12) all took place on the same day, 10 July 1918, from Bristol F.2b (C1003). He and his pilot Gurdon took on three Pfalz D.III aircraft, all over Armentières-Lille, Nord. One was destroyed and the other two sent out of control.

== Death ==
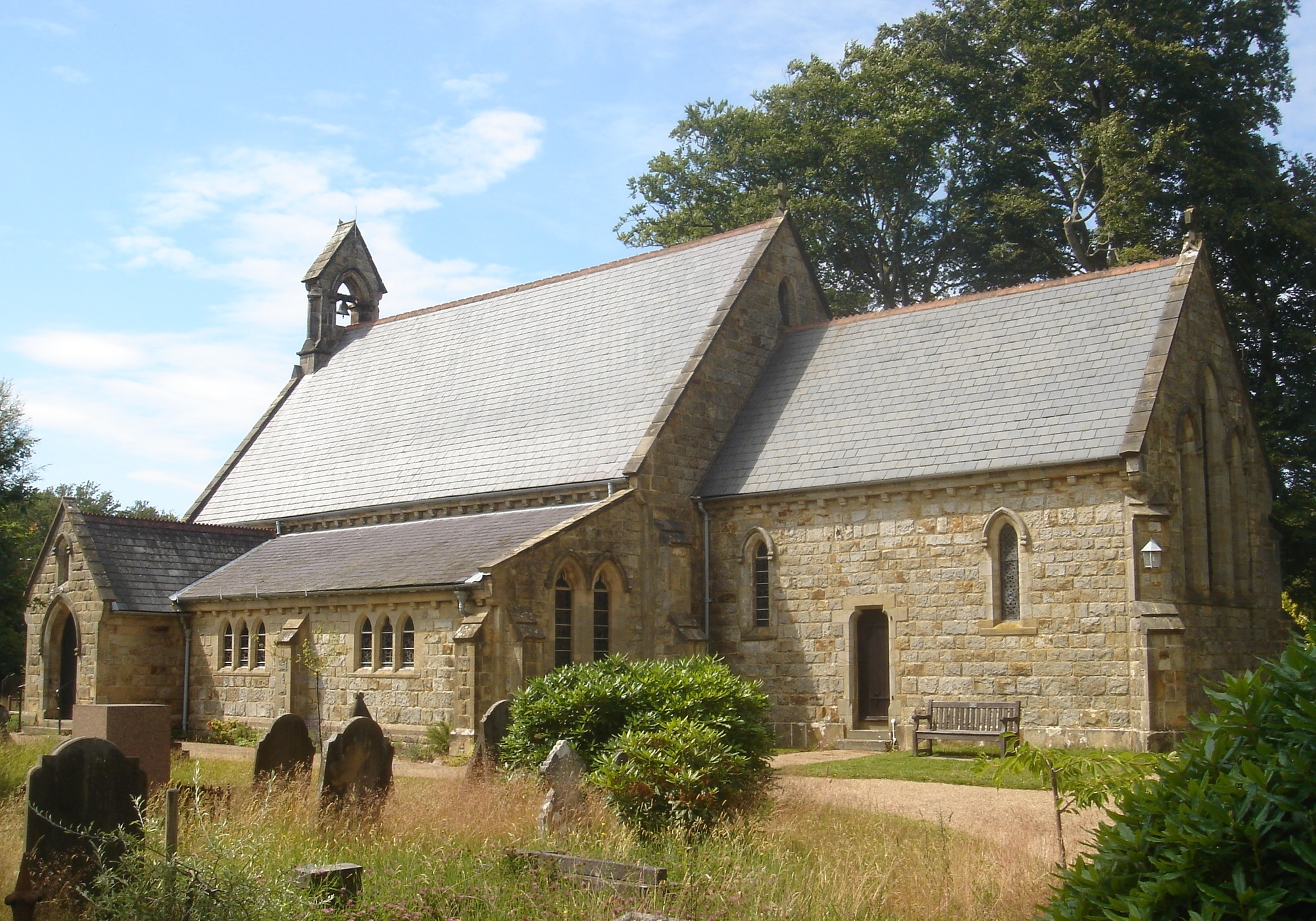
Church of All Saints in Crawley Down.

Scaramanga was severely wounded in a dogfight and lost consciousness before he took down his twelfth and final enemy aircraft on 10 July 1918. He regained consciousness and with his one good arm shot down the attacking Pfalz D.III that had been on their tail. He died that same day, soon after he and his pilot, Lieutenant John Everard Gurdon, landed, about two weeks short of his twentieth birthday. Scaramanga was interred at Aire Communal Cemetery in Aire-sur-la-Lys, Pas-de-Calais, France. His grave reference number is III. H. 25. He is also commemorated on the Crawley Down War Memorial in Crawley Down, Worth, Sussex. The monument is located at the junction of Vicarage Road and Sandy Lane, down the road from the Church of All Saints. While the memorial does not list the names of the fallen, there is a roll of honour which lists those names at the church. Despite having been credited with twelve aerial victories and seriously wounded twice, the second time fatally, Lieutenant James John Scaramanga does not appear to have been decorated.

His pilot, Lieutenant Gurdon, survived the encounter that killed Scaramanga. On 3 August 1918, the Supplement to the London Gazette announced that he had been awarded the Distinguished Flying Cross. In addition, after he recovered, Gurdon scored an additional five victories in August 1918, for a total count of 28, and attained the rank of captain.

== Gallery of aircraft downed ==
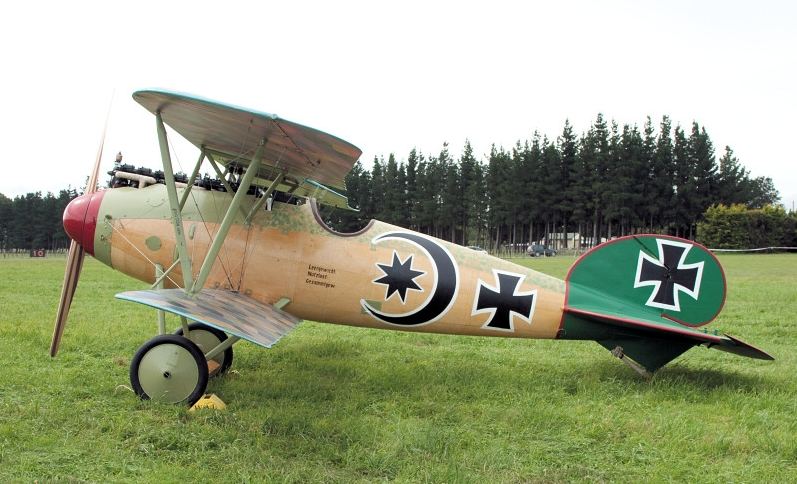
Albatros D.V
Victory 1

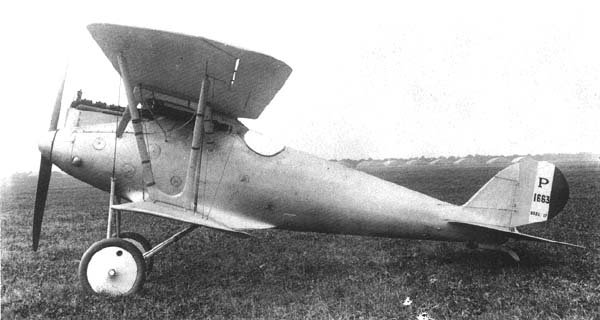
Pfalz D.III
Victories 2, 7, 10–12

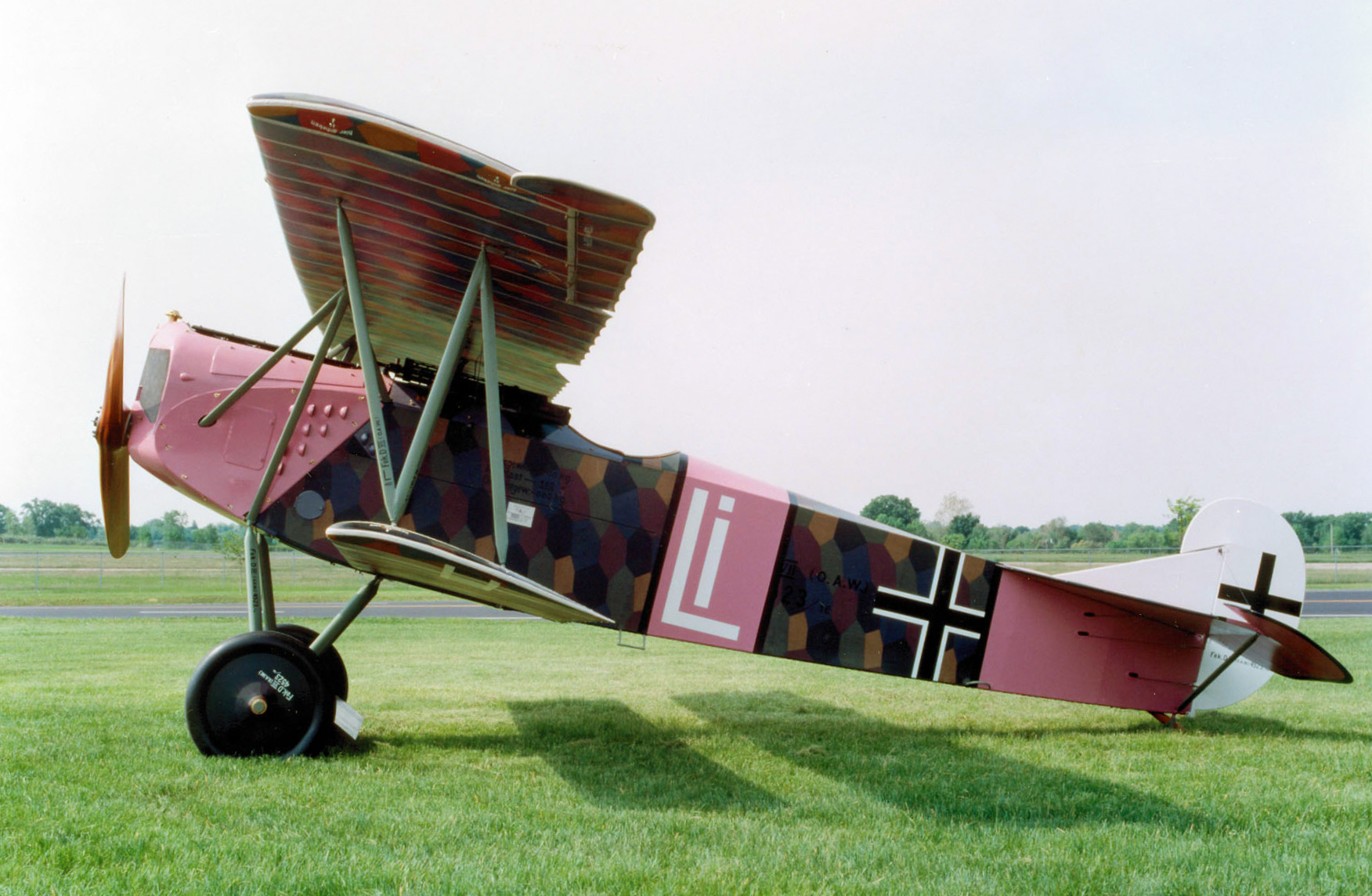
Fokker D.VII
Victories 3–5, 8

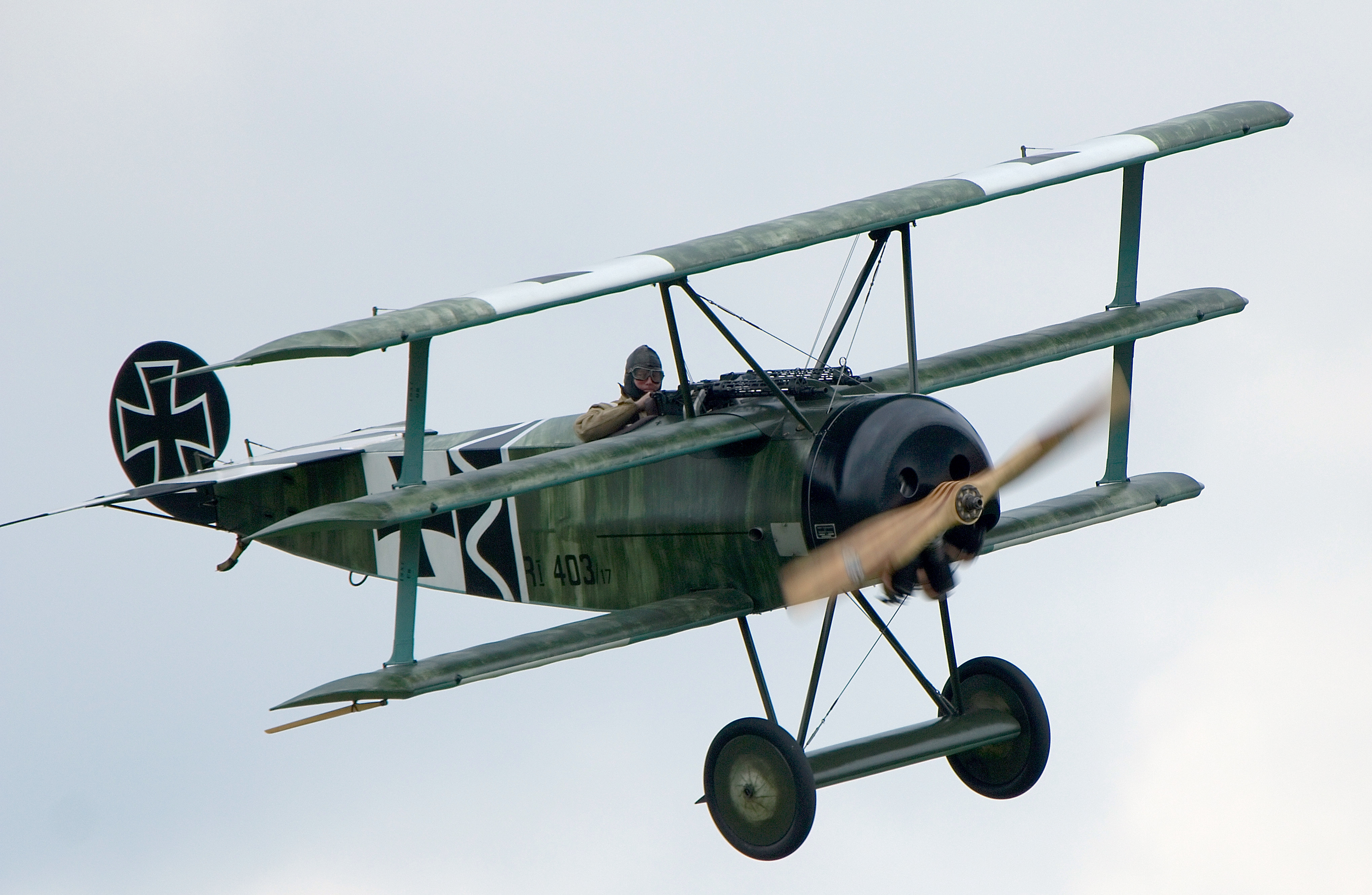
Fokker Dr.I
Victory 6
