= Douglas Graham Cooke =

British flying ace (1895–1955)

- Born: 26 July 1895; Wimbledon, Surrey, England
- Died: 1955 (aged 59–60); Surrey, England
- Military career
- Allegiance: United Kingdom
- Branch: British Army; Royal Air Force
- Service years: 1917–1919
- Rank: Captain
- Unit: No. 20 Squadron RAF
- Awards: Military Cross

Captain Douglas Graham Cooke MC (26 July 1895 – 1955) was a British World War I flying ace credited with 13 aerial victories.

== Biography ==
Cooke commissioned as a probationary second lieutenant on the General List, assigned to the Royal Flying Corps on 24 May 1917, and received the Royal Aero Club Aviator's Certificate No. 4825 at the Military School at Ruislip on 16 June after soloing in a Maurice Farman biplane. He was confirmed in his rank on 10 September.

Assigned to No. 20 Squadron, Cooke's string of victories began on 22 January 1918 and extended until 19 May. His observers manning the guns in the rear seat of his Bristol F.2 Fighter included fellow aces Henry Crowe, James Scaramanga and Ernest Hardcastle. His final tally was five enemy fighter planes destroyed and eight driven down out of control, with nine enemy planes falling to his pilot's gun. These kills earned him the post of flight commander with its concomitant promotion to temporary captain on 11 April, as well as the award of the Military Cross in July. He was transferred to the unemployed list on 26 July 1919.

== Honours and awards ==
Military Cross
Temporary Lieutenant Douglas Graham Cooke, RAF.
For conspicuous gallantry and devotion to duty when engaged in many low bombing patrols and low reconnaissances. On one occasion, when important information was required, he flew along a front of ten miles at 100 feet, being subjected the whole way to heavy fire from the ground, and on the same day along another front of twelve miles at 300 feet, each time returning with the information and his machine much shot about. He has destroyed several hostile machines in air combats, and has invariably displayed the highest courage and a splendid fighting spirit.

== Bibliography ==
- Shores, Christopher F.; Franks, Norman & Guest, Russell (1990). Above the Trenches: A Complete Record of the Fighter Aces and Units of the British Empire Air Forces 1915–1920. London, UK: Grub Street. ISBN 0-948817-19-4.
- Guttman, Jon (2007). Bristol F 2 Fighter Aces of World War I. Oxford, UK: Osprey Publishing. ISBN 978-1-84603-201-1.
