= Arthur Ernest Newland =

British flying ace (1882–1964)

- Born: 1882; Enfield Lock, Middlesex, England
- Died: 1964 (aged 81–82); Edmonton, Essex, England
- Military career
- Allegiance: United Kingdom
- Branch: British Army; Royal Air Force
- Rank: Sergeant
- Unit: No. 20 Squadron RAF
- Conflicts: World War I
- Awards: Distinguished Flying Medal & Bar

Sergeant Arthur Ernest Newland DFM & Bar (1882–1964) was a British World War I observer ace credited with 22 victories.

== Early life ==
Newland was born about 1882 to Jane Newland, who was from Clerkenwell. His father William was a labourer from Westminster.

== Aerial service ==
Newland was assigned to No. 20 Squadron RAF as an observer/gunner in the rear seat of a Bristol F.2 Fighter. He was teamed with several pilot aces, such as Paul Iaccaci, Dennis Latimer, and George E. Randall, although his primary pilot, with whom he scored ten victories, was August Iaccaci.

He scored his first triumph on 18 May 1918, and was already an ace by the end of the month, with 6 wins. He scored three more times in June. There was then a lull in his string, until his double victories on 14 August, followed by a hat trick on the 21st. Another win tallied on the 22nd made him a triple ace.

He then shot doubles on the 6th, 15th, and 27 September. Combined with a single on 16 September, that brought his final count to 22. In summary, he destroyed 19 enemy aircraft, including two shared victories. Additionally, he drove down three enemies out of control. With one exception, his victories were over enemy fighter planes.

== Honours and awards ==
Distinguished Flying Medal
No. 67162 Private, 1st Class, Arthur Newland (Enfield Wash).

"He is an excellent shot, and has done remarkably well as an observer, gaining the confidence of the pilots with whom he has served. He has personally assisted in shooting down five enemy aeroplanes."

Bar to the Distinguished Flying Medal
67162 Sergeant-Observer Arthur Newland, DFM. (Enfield Wash). (FRANCE)

"This non-commissioned officer sets a splendid example of courage, skill and determination to the other non-commissioned officers of his squadron. During the month of August he crashed six enemy machines."
