= Exton, Rutland =

Village and former civil parish in Rutland, England

Coordinates: 52.690°N 0.633°W

Exton
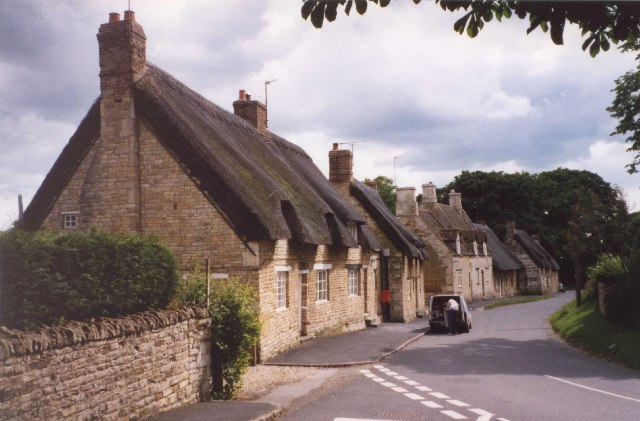
- Thatched cottages in Exton

- Location within Rutland
- Area: 6.36 sq mi (16.5 km^{2})
- Population: 600 (2001 Census)
  - Density: 94/sq mi (36/km^{2})
- OS grid reference: SK924111
  - London: 85 miles (137 km) SSE
- Civil parish: Exton and Horn
- Unitary authority: Rutland
- Ceremonial county: Rutland
- Region: East Midlands
- Country: England
- Sovereign state: United Kingdom
- Post town: OAKHAM
- Postcode district: LE15
- Dialling code: 01572
- Police: Leicestershire
- Fire: Leicestershire
- Ambulance: East Midlands
- UK Parliament: Rutland and Stamford

Exton is a village and former civil parish, now in the parish of Exton and Horn, in the county of Rutland, England. The population of the parish was 607 at the 2011 census. On 1 April 2016 the parish was abolished and merged with Horn to form "Exton and Horn".

== The village ==
The village's name means 'farm/settlement which has oxen'.

The village includes a tree-planted green overlooked by the Fox and Hounds pub. Close to the green is the war memorial to the dead of Exton and Whitwell and to relatives of the Earl of Gainsborough; the names include Tom Cecil Noel MC and Bar and Maurice Dease VC. The memorial was designed by Alfred Young Nutt.

In the south of the parish towards Rutland Water is Barnsdale Gardens which were created by Geoff Hamilton of the BBC television series Gardeners' World.

Further south, on the north shore of Rutland Water, stands what was the Barnsdale country house and is now the Barnsdale Hall Hotel and Country Club. Barnsdale was a large country house, built in 1890 as a hunting lodge for Earl Fitzwilliam by architect E. J. May. It is a Grade II listed building.

== Exton Park ==
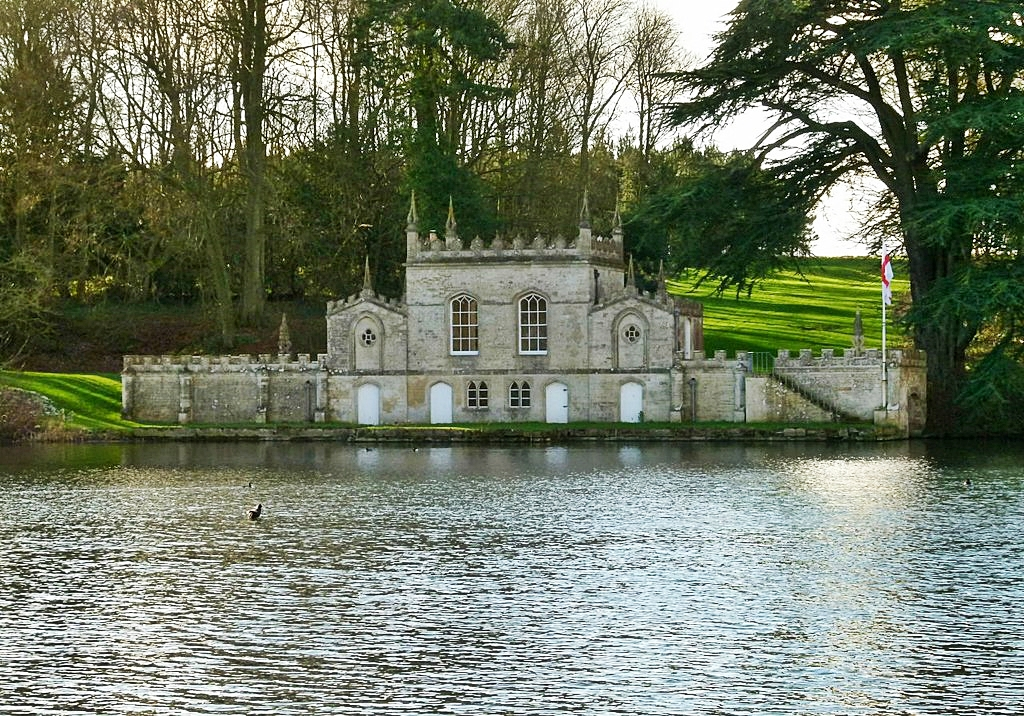
Fort Henry in Exton Park

Exton Park is a large country estate which has been home to the Noel family (Earls of Gainsborough) for over four centuries. The present Exton Hall was built in the 19th century close to the ruins of the original Tudor mansion which had burnt down in 1810. The romantic Fort Henry, a pleasure-house in the elegant late-eighteenth century Gothick style, overlooks lakes formed by the North Brook.

== Church of St Peter and St Paul ==
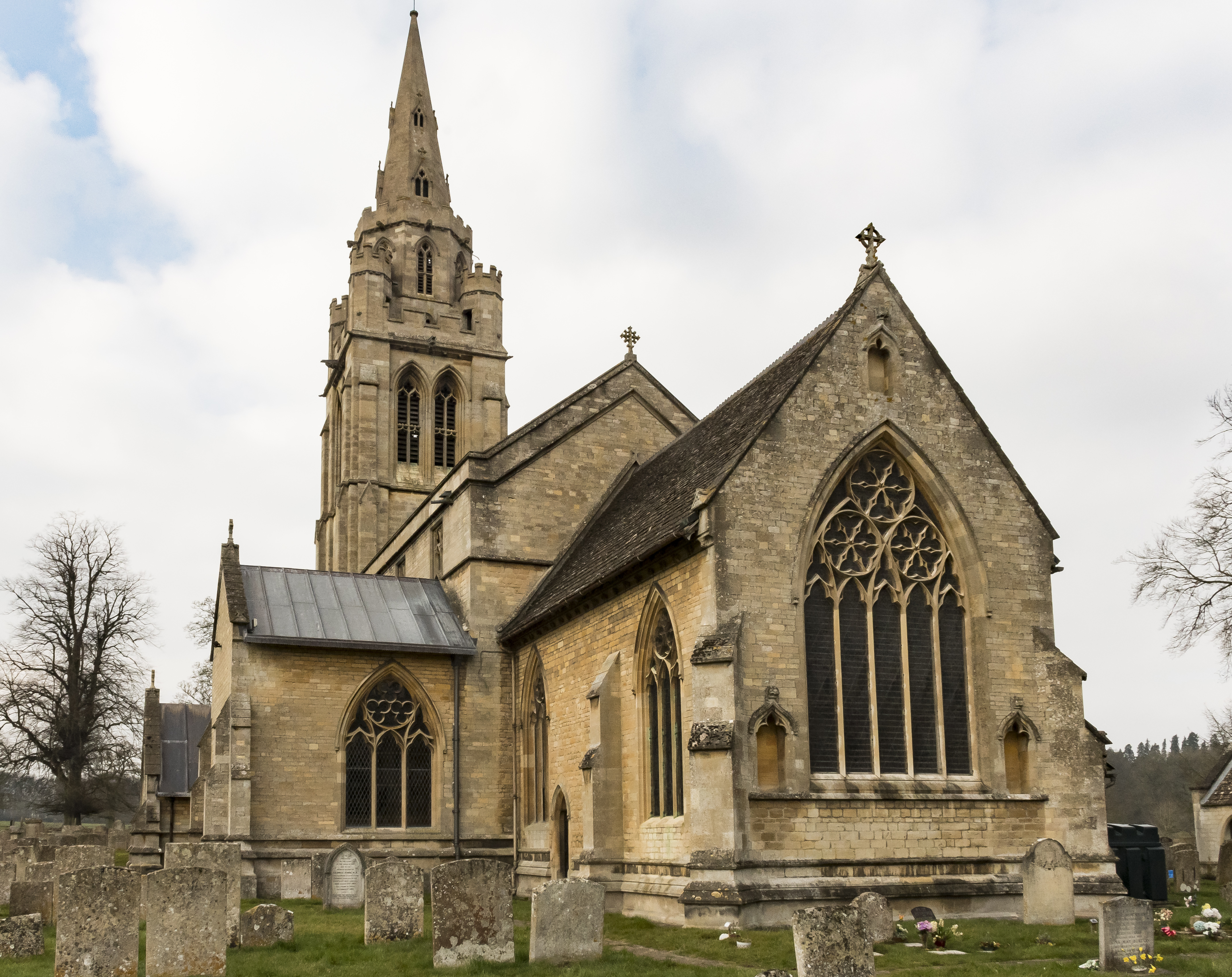
Church of St Peter and St Paul, Exton, Rutland

The large Church of England parish church St Peter & St Paul lies within the park and contains a collection of monuments including work by Joseph Nollekens. It is an impressive medieval parish church, built in the 13th and 14th centuries. The church is a Grade I listed building.

There is a fine marble monument by Grinling Gibbons, dating from 1685, showing Baptist Noel, 3rd Viscount Campden, with his fourth wife, Elizabeth Bertie, and carvings of his 19 children. In 1954, the tomb was the subject of a design by John Piper, later adapted as a textile design by David Whitehead Ltd.

Other monuments in the church include:

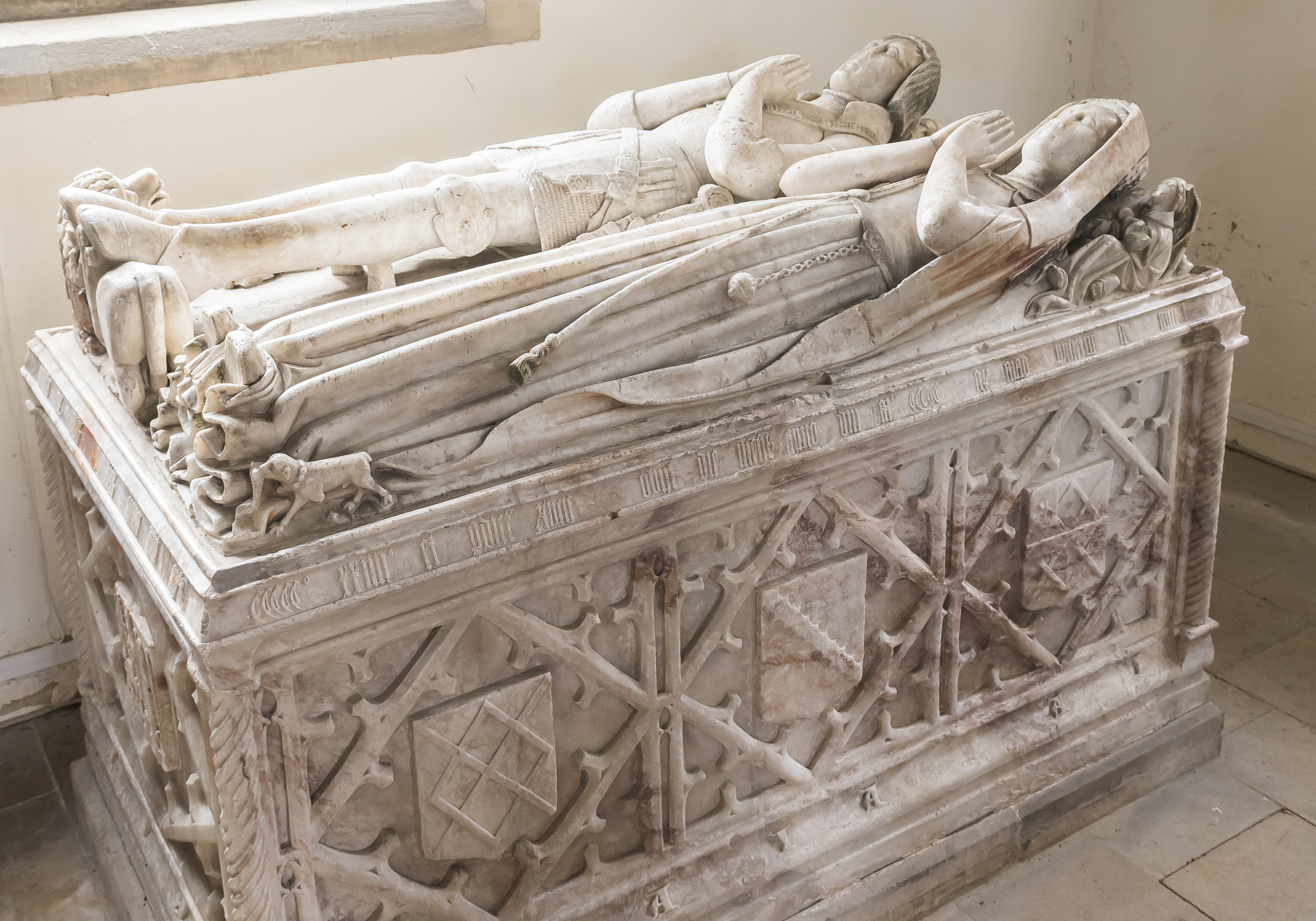
The Harington monument

- Robert Keilway (1497 – 1581), politician and court official.
- Sir James Harington (c. 1511 – 1592), public servant who fulfilled a number of legal, legislative and law enforcement duties and was knighted in 1565.
- Baptist Noel, 4th Earl of Gainsborough (1708 – 21 March 1751), Member of Parliament, styled Viscount Campden until 1714.
- Frances Noel, Countess of Gainsborough VA (20 November 1814 – 12 May 1885), Lady of the Bedchamber to Queen Victoria.
- George Douglas-Pennant, 2nd Baron Penrhyn (30 September 1836 – 10 March 1907), landowner who played a prominent part in the Welsh slate industry as the owner of the Penrhyn Quarry in North Wales.
- Lieutenant Tom Cecil Noel MC (12 December 1897 – 22 August 1918), World War I infantry officer turned aerial observer, notable for winning a Military Cross for bravery on both land and air.

The church spire was struck by lightning in 1843, causing a fire that melted the roof, shattered the windows, and destroyed the west end of the church. It was subsequently rebuilt by J. L. Pearson in 1852/3.

== Gallery ==
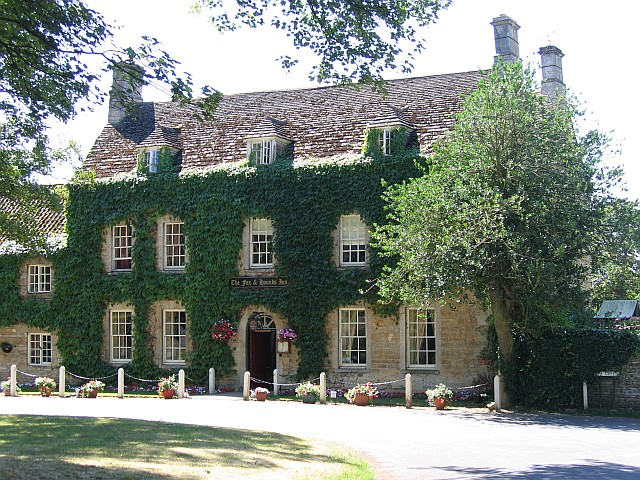
The Fox and Hounds overlooks the village green

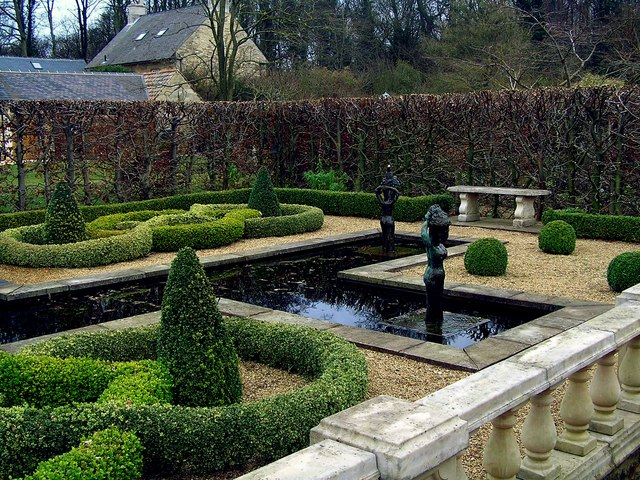
Knot Garden at Barnsdale Gardens

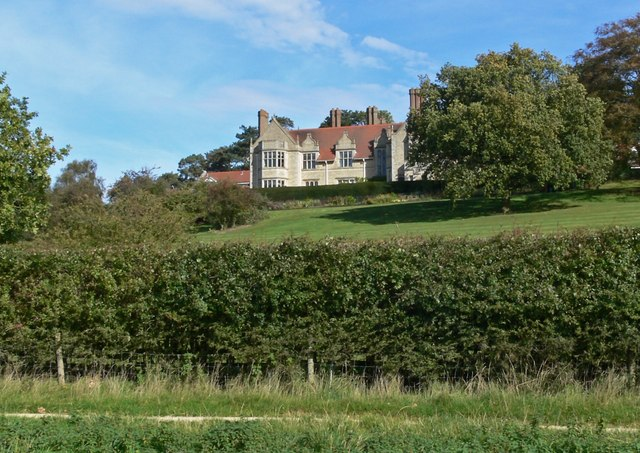
Barnsdale Hall

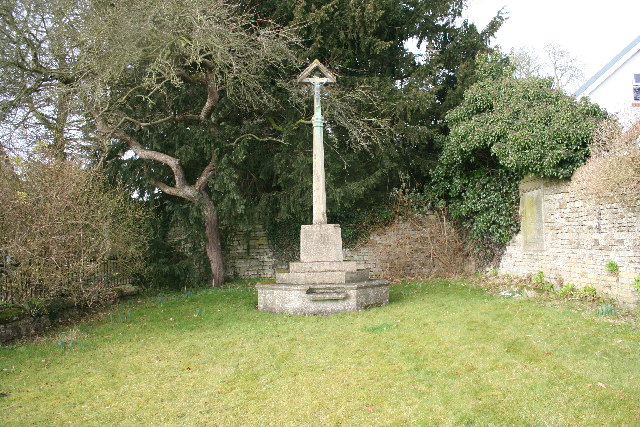
The Exton and Whitwell War Memorial

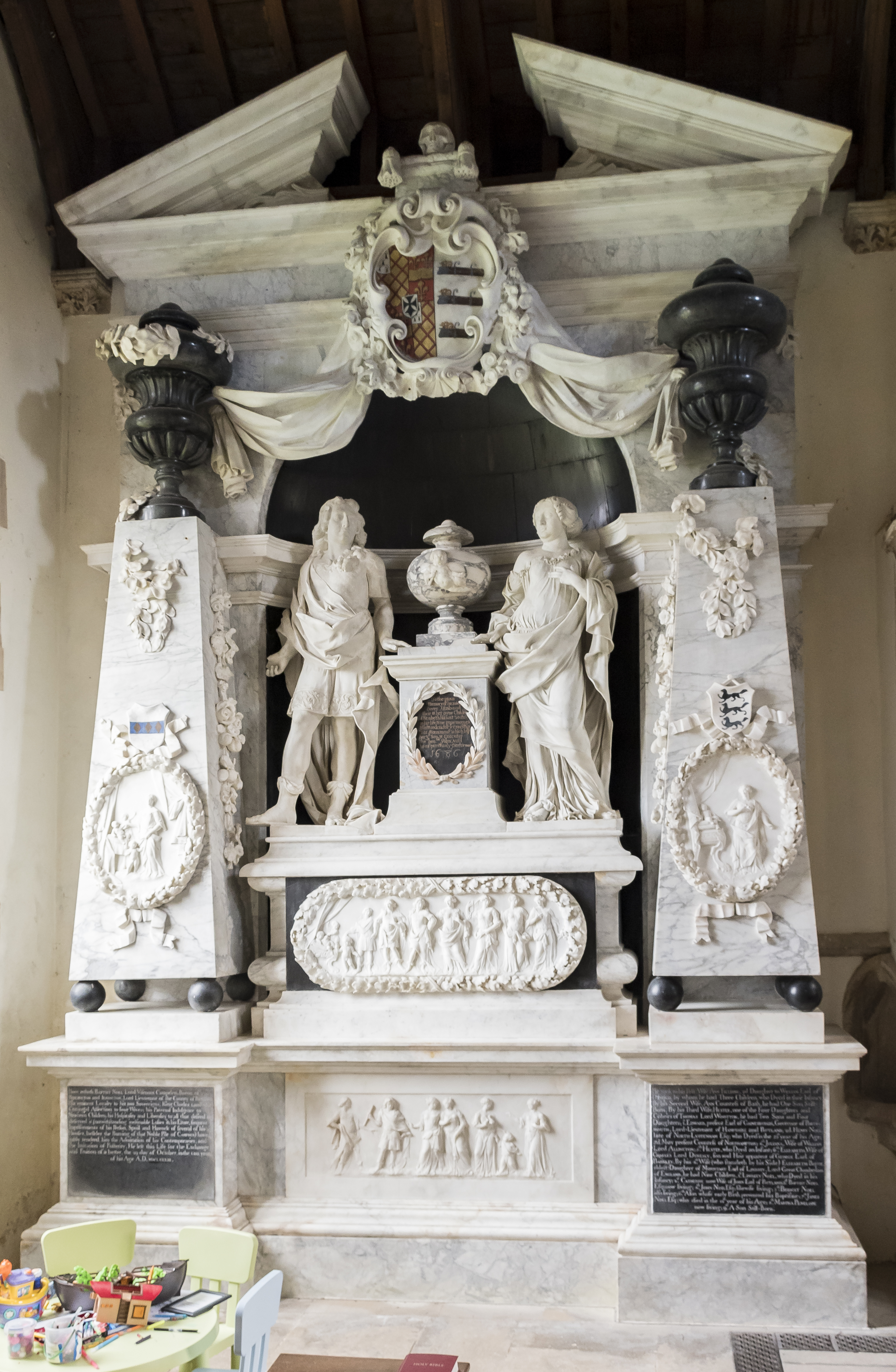
Viscount Campden's monument

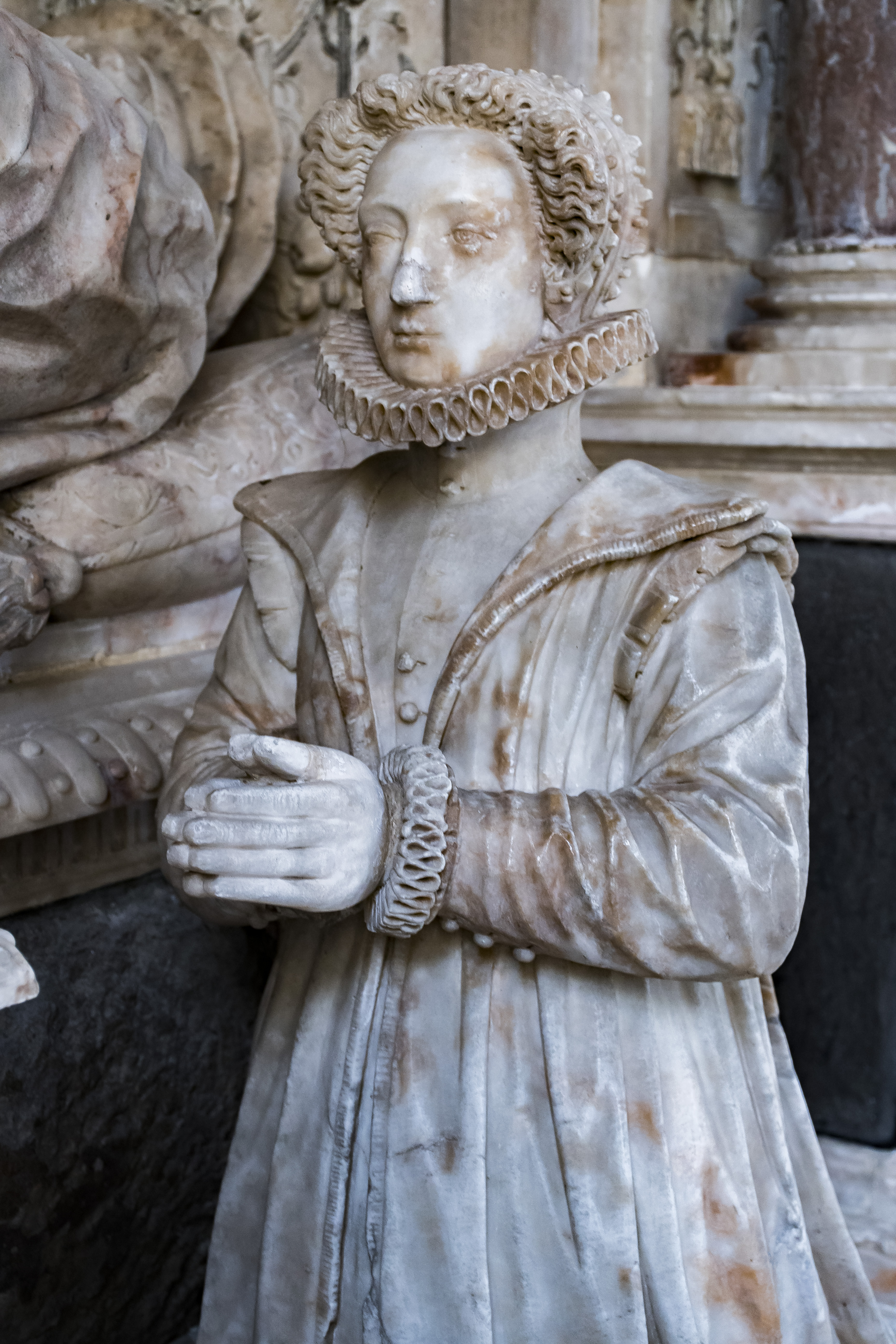
A detail of the Kelway monument
