= Church of St Peter and St Paul, Exton, Rutland =

Church in Exton, Rutland, England

Coordinates: 52°41′26″N 0°38′22″W

Church of St Peter and St Paul, Exton
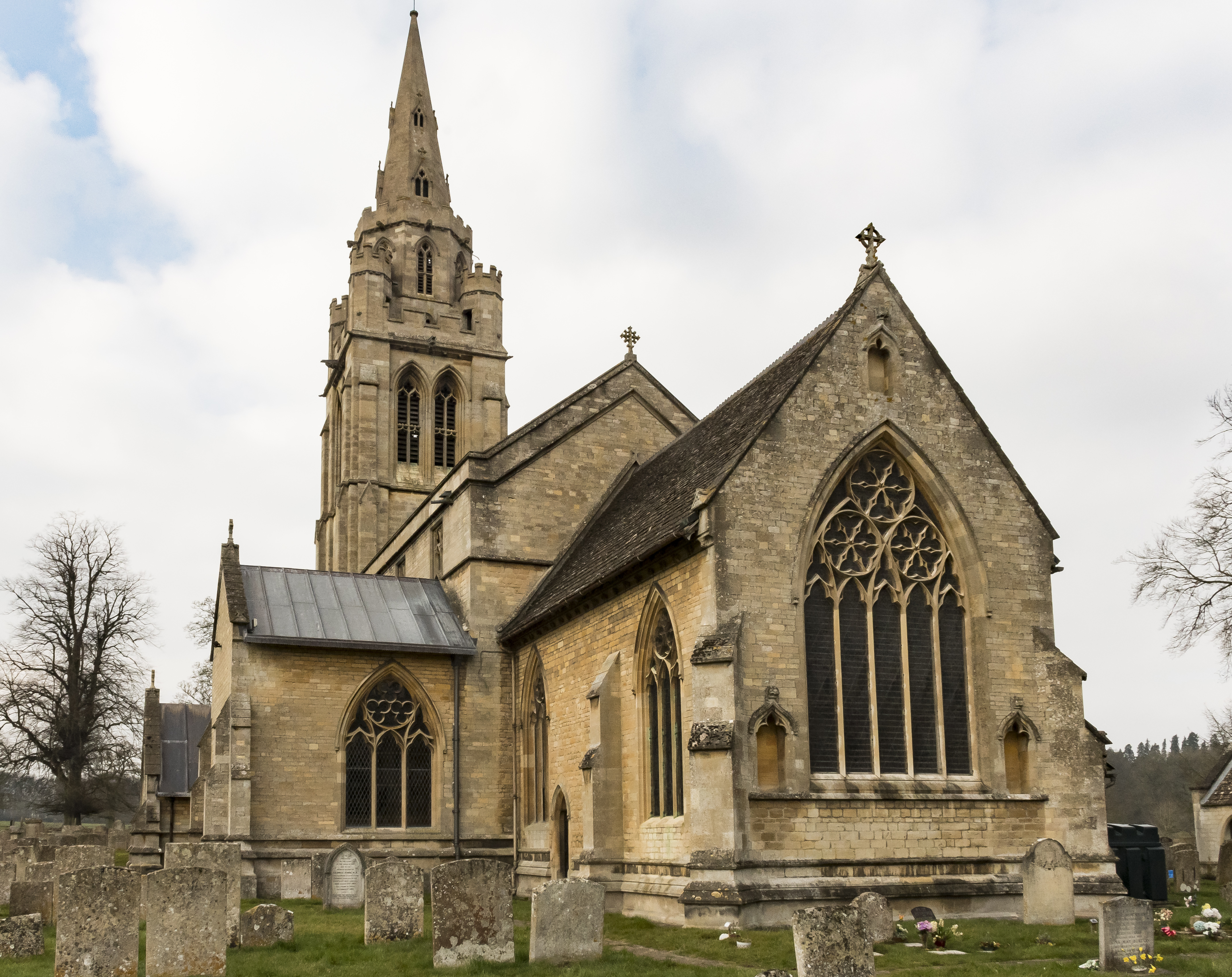
- Church of St Peter and St Paul, Exton
- OS grid reference: SK 92052 11192
- Location: Exton, Rutland
- Country: England
- Denomination: Church of England

History
- Dedication: St Peter, St Paul

Administration
- Diocese: Peterborough
- Parish: Exton, Rutland

The Church of St Peter and St Paul is a church in Exton, Rutland. The Church of England parish church lies within the park of Exton Hall, slightly apart from the village. It is a large medieval church and contains an impressive collection of monuments, including work by Joseph Nollekens. It is a Grade I listed building.

== History ==
The current exterior of the church dates back to the 13th century, though the interior is mostly Victorian. In 1843 the spire was struck by lightning which damaged most of the gallery and nave. It was rebuilt by J. L. Pearson in 1852/3.

The font dates from the 14th century and has faces carved on the corners.

== Monuments ==
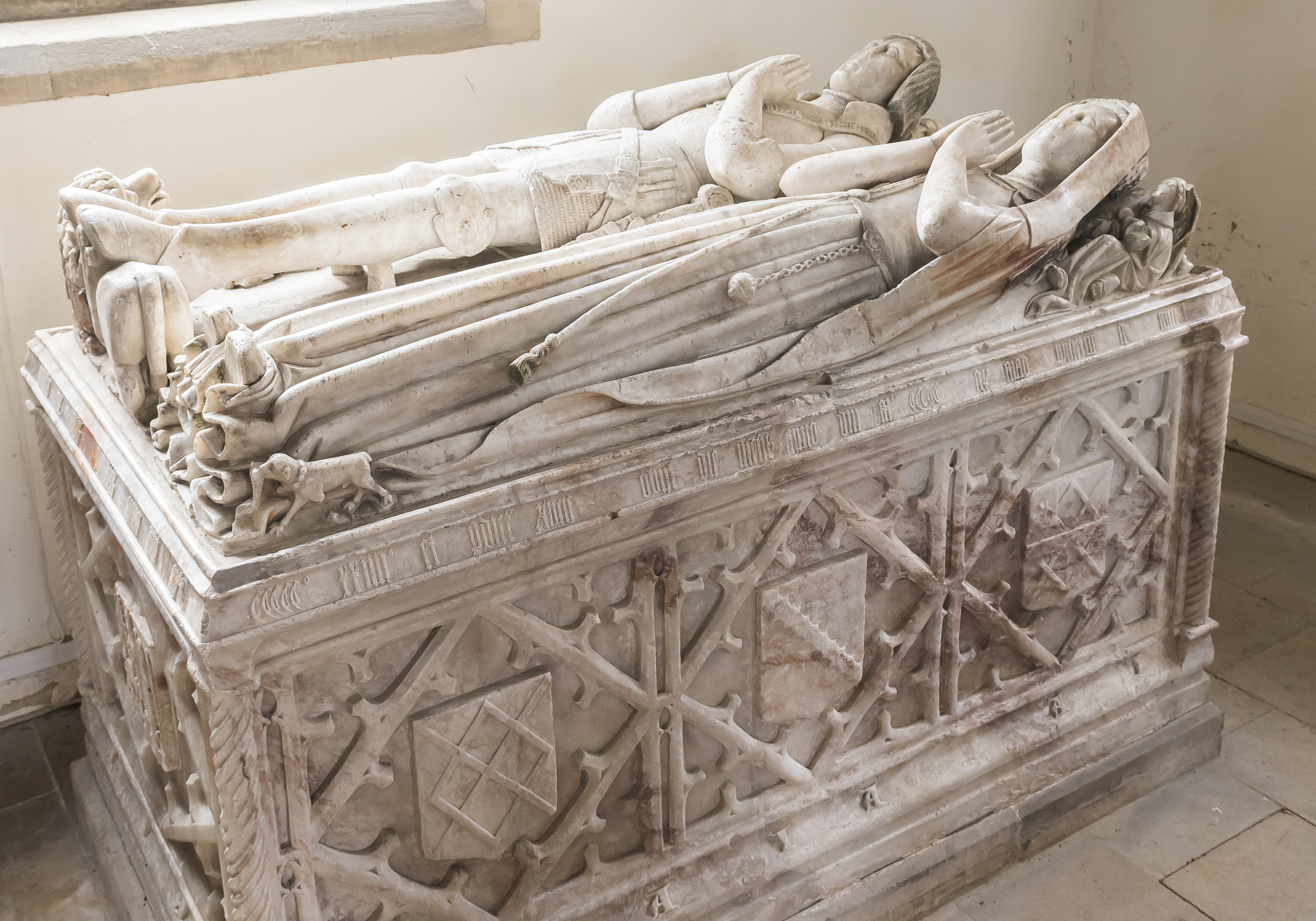
The Harington monument

The church has 16th–18th-century monuments as well as armorial banners and funerary of the Noel family.

in the north transept is a fine marble monument by Grinling Gibbons, dating from 1685, showing Baptist Noel, 3rd Viscount Campden, with his fourth wife, Elizabeth Bertie, and carvings of his 19 children. In 1954, the tomb was the subject of a print by John Piper, later adapted as a textile design by David Whitehead Ltd.

The south transept has the Keilway monument. This holds the effigies of Robert Keilway (1497–1581), along with his daughter Anne and her husband John Harington.

On the north wall of the chancel there is a Jacobean wall monument. The oldest monument in the church stands on the north wall of the sanctuary, the tomb of Nicholas Grene dating from the 14th century. The tomb of James Harington (c. 1511 – 1592) and Lucy Harington is nearby.

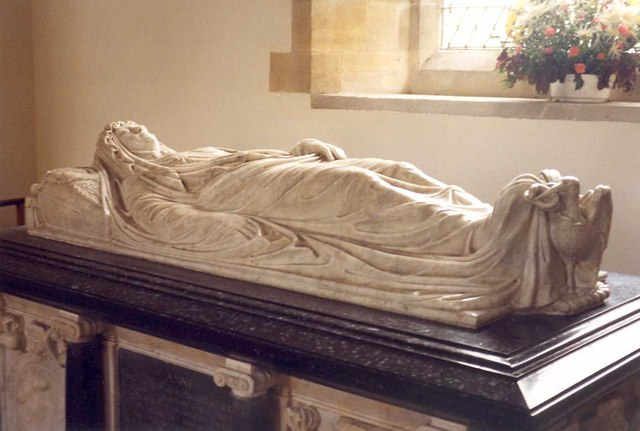
Anne Chichester's monument

The tomb of Anne Chichester, wife of Thomas Bruce, 1st Earl of Elgin, is situated in the north aisle.

Other monuments in the church include:

- Baptist Noel, 4th Earl of Gainsborough (1708–1751), Member of Parliament, styled Viscount Campden until 1714.
- Frances Noel, Countess of Gainsborough (1814–1885), Lady of the Bedchamber to Queen Victoria.
- George Douglas-Pennant, 2nd Baron Penrhyn (1836–1907), landowner who played a prominent part in the Welsh slate industry as the owner of the Penrhyn Quarry.
- Tom Cecil Noel (1897–1918), First World War infantry officer turned aerial observer, notable for winning a Military Cross on both land and air.

== Popular culture ==
The church featured in the 1980 film Little Lord Fauntleroy as the parish church of Dorincourt.
