= Leslie Powell =

- Born: Leslie Archibald Powell; 27 June 1896; Redland, Bristol, England
- Died: 6 February 1961 (aged 64); Worthing, Sussex, England
- Military career
- Allegiance: United Kingdom
- Branch: Royal Flying Corps
- Rank: Lieutenant
- Unit: No. 11 Squadron RFC
- Awards: Military Cross with Bar

Lieutenant Leslie Archibald Powell (27 June 1896 – 6 February 1961) was a First World War flying ace credited with 19 aerial victories. Throughout WWI, Powell served in the Royal Navy, British Army and Royal Air Force.

== Early life ==
Powell was born in Redland, Bristol, to Archibald George and Rosie Powell. He had a brother Geoffrey Edward Powell who was born in 1907. Powell was a journalist before the war, joining the Western Daily Press in 1913.

== Military service ==
Powell joined the Royal Navy in December 1914 and was posted to HMS Pembroke. Between 1915 and 1916, Powell was posted at HMS President. In February 1916, he transferred from the Royal Naval Air Service as a Petty Officer Mechanic to the 8th Battalion Gloucestershire Regiment.

In April 1917, Powell transferred to the Royal Flying Corps, joining the No. 1 School of Military Aeronautics (SMA) in Reading. He was also sent to Brooklands Aerodrome, Kent, before being posted to No. 11 Squadron in France in July 1917.

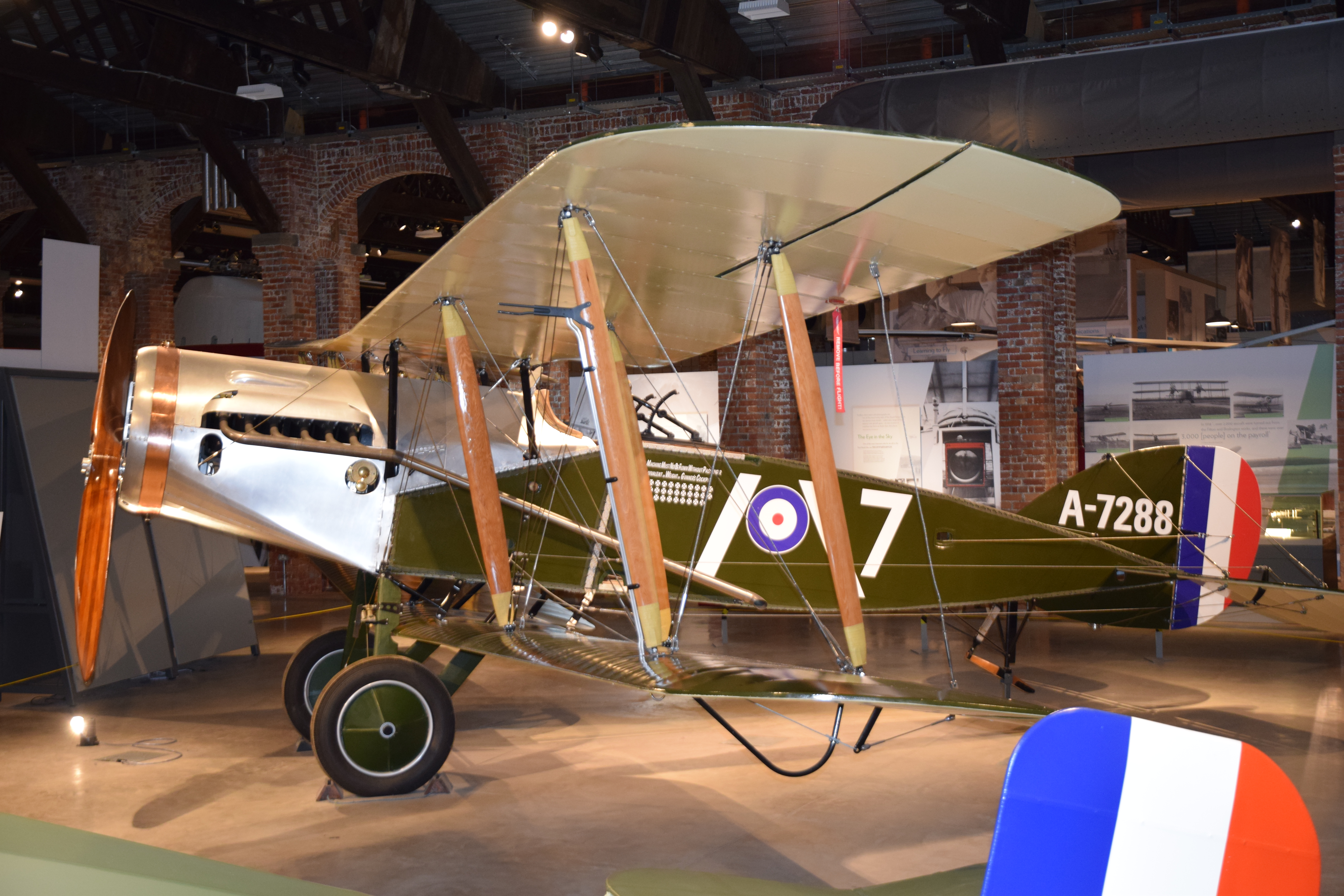
Replica of Powell and McKeever's Bristol F.2b (A7288), which was flown on 30 November 1917, at Aerospace Bristol, Filton.

He flew as an observer/gunner on the Bristol F.2b. All but one of his victories came while he was teamed with Andrew McKeever. Powell's victory roll began with triple victories on both 7 July 1917 and 5 August. He would score another triple triumph on 31 October, and double victories on 23 September and 16 October 1917. He closed out his list with four victories on 30 November 1917, scored in a running dogfight between his plane and seven German fighters. Powell's Lewis machine gun jammed while they were being attacked by another German fighter. McKeever rolled the Bristol into what seemed a death dive, and the German sheered off. McKeever recovered at 20 feet altitude before managing to escape the surviving Germans. His only victory without McKeever was with Geoffrey H. Hooper on 11 September 1917.

On 25 January 1918, Powell and McKeever were withdrawn from combat duty and assigned to Home Establishment back in Britain.
