= Tom Cecil Noel =

British World War I flying ace

- Born: 12 December 1897; Ashwell, Rutland, England
- Died: 22 August 1918 (aged 20); Near Westrozebeke, Belgium
- Burial place: Perth (China Wall) Cemetery, Ypres, West Flanders, Belgium
- Relatives: Gerard Noel (grandfather)
- Military career
- Allegiance: United Kingdom
- Branch: British Army; Royal Air Force
- Service years: 1914–1918
- Rank: Lieutenant
- Units: King's Own Scottish Borderers; No. 20 Squadron RFC/RAF
- Conflicts: First World War • Western Front
- Awards: Military Cross & Bar

Lieutenant Tom Cecil Noel MC* (12 December 1897 – 22 August 1918) was a British First World War infantry officer turned aerial observer, notable for winning a Military Cross for bravery on both land and air. In conjunction with his pilots, he was credited with 24 victories over enemy aircraft, consisting of 12 destroyed, 1 captured, and 11 (2 shared) 'out of control'. He is considered a non-pilot ace.

== Family background and education ==
Noel was born in Ashwell, Rutland, the oldest of three sons born to Gerard Cecil Noel (1864–1925) and Madeline Edith Clifton (1867–1946). His grandfathers were Gerard James Noel and Thomas Henry Clifton. He was educated at Eton College.

== Military service ==
Noel was commissioned as a second lieutenant (on probation) in the 3rd Battalion, King's Own Scottish Borderers on 12 December 1914 (his 17th birthday), and was confirmed in his rank on 4 September 1915.

He served in France on the Western Front, and on 26 September 1917 was awarded the Military Cross. His award was gazetted on 8 January 1918, the citation reading:

Lt Tom Cecil Noel, K.O.S.B., Spec. Res.

"For conspicuous gallantry and devotion to duty. Previous to laying a forming-up tape for his battalion he reconnoitred the ground under exceptionally difficult circumstances, under heavy hostile fire. Later, he successfully and accurately laid the tape, and throughout the action of the following day led his men with the utmost ability and contempt of danger, setting a splendid example to all."

Noel was seconded to the Royal Flying Corps, to serve in No. 20 Squadron RFC as an observer/gunner in Bristol F.2B two-seater fighters. He gained his first aerial victory on 19 January, driving down an Albatros D.V out of control south-west of Roeselare, with pilot Captain N. V. Harrison. He was officially appointed a flying officer (observer) on 26 March 1918, with seniority from 4 January, and the next day gained his second victory, destroying another D.V west of Cappy, with pilot Lieutenant R. G. Bennett. From then on he was paired with Captain Dennis Latimer, with whom he gained his remaining 22 victories, with one in April, 13 in May, and four each in June and July. On 22 August 1918, Noel was flying with Latimer when they were shot down by Leutnant Willi Nebgen of Jasta 7. Noel was killed and Latimer was captured.

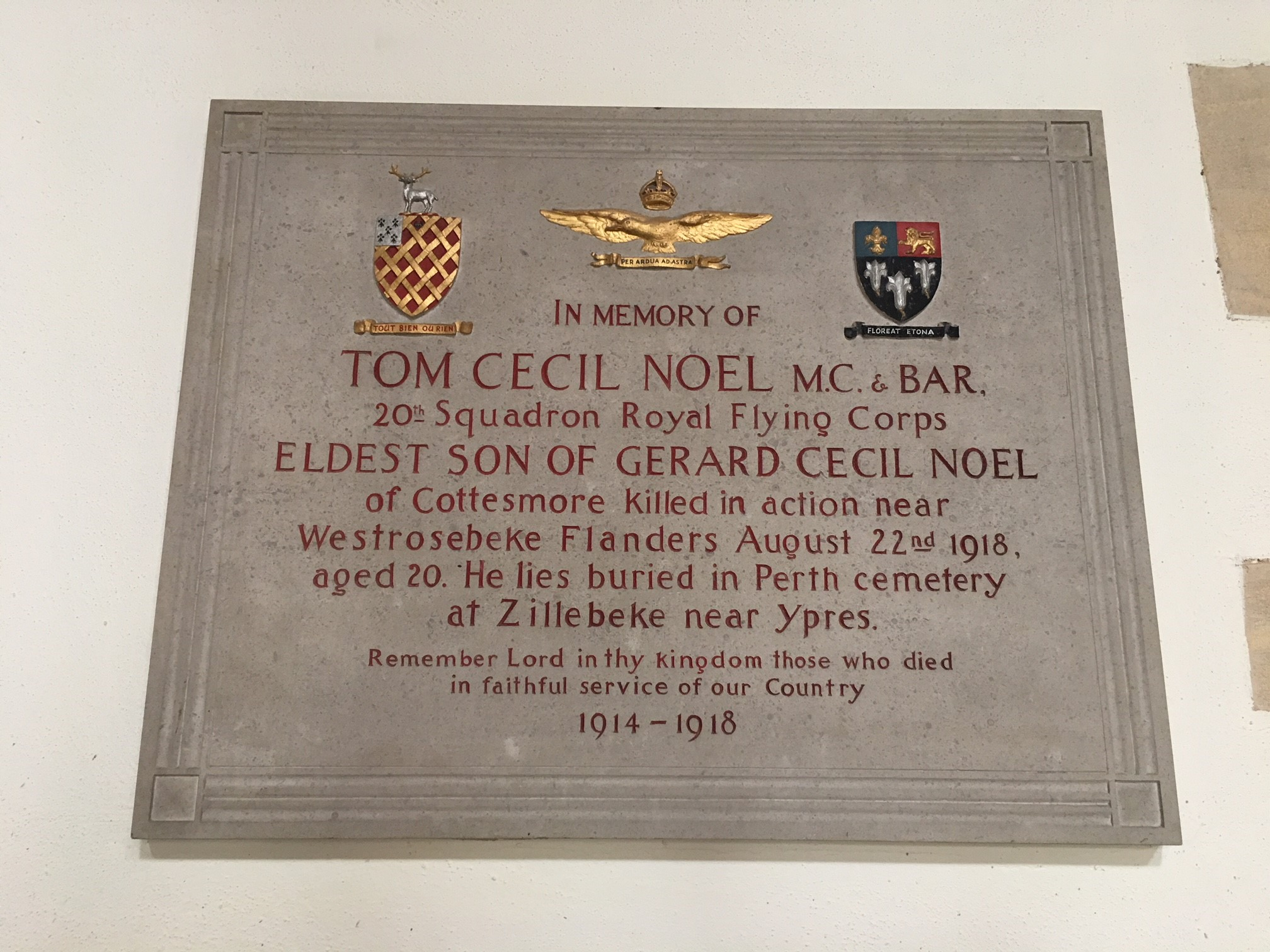
Memorial to Tom Cecil Noel in the Church of St Peter and St Paul, Exton, Rutland

Noel was awarded a bar to his Military Cross, which was gazetted posthumously on 13 September 1918 for "conspicuous gallantry and devotion to duty. In four days he and his pilot destroyed seven enemy machines and drove down three out of control. His courage and skill are of the first order, and of inestimable value to his squadron."

Noel was originally buried by the Germans at Westrozebeke, but was re-interred at the Perth (China Wall) Cemetery in Ypres, Belgium, in October 1924. In Rutland he is commemorated in St Peter and St Paul's Church, Exton, and on the war memorials at St Nicholas' Church, Cottesmore, St Peter and St Paul's Church, Great Casterton, and All Saints' Church, Little Casterton; in the village of Exton he also appears on the base of the war memorial cross to the dead of Exton and Whitwell and to relatives of the Earl of Gainsborough, including Maurice Dease VC. He has a memorial plaque in the grounds of Eton.
