= William McKenzie Thomson =

Canadian First World War flying ace

William Thomson
- Born: 15 September 1898; Lachine, Quebec
- Died: 9 July 1987 (aged 88)
- Military career
- Allegiance: George V
- Branch: Royal Flying Corps; Royal Air Force
- Unit: No. 20 Squadron RAF
- Conflicts: First World War
- Awards: Military Cross; Distinguished Flying Cross

William McKenzie Thomson MC, DFC (15 September 1898 – 9 July 1987) was a Canadian First World War flying ace, officially credited with 26 victories while flying Bristol Fighters with No. 20 Squadron of the Royal Flying Corps and Royal Air Force.

== Text of citations ==
=== Military Cross ===
Flight Lieutenant William MacKenzie Thomson, MC, DFC, distinguished himself through conspicuous gallantry and an unwavering devotion to duty during offensive patrols. Over a remarkable five-day period, Thomson neutralized five opponent aircraft, demonstrating a commendable determination to engage the opponent at close range. His actions served as a definitive example of enterprise and bravery, marking him as an notable presence within the Royal Air Force.

=== Distinguished Flying Cross ===
"Lieut. William McKenzie Thomson, M.C. This officer has destroyed thirteen enemy machines, invariably displaying courage, determination and skill. Disparity in numbers never daunts him. On a recent occasion, in company with eight other machines, his formation was attacked by twenty-five scouts; he shot one down. On another occasion his formation of ten machines engaged between twenty and thirty Fokkers; in the combat that ensued this officer shot down one out of the four that were destroyed."
