= Horace Percy Lale =

British World War I flying ace

- Born: 8 April 1886; Nottingham, Nottinghamshire, England
- Died: 5 April 1955 (aged 68); Swindon, Wiltshire, England
- Military career
- Allegiance: United Kingdom
- Branch: British Army; Royal Air Force
- Service years: 1916-1941
- Rank: Group Captain
- Conflicts: First World War; Waziristan campaign (1919–20); Second World War
- Awards: Distinguished Service Order; Distinguished Flying Cross with Bar; Mention in Dispatches

Group Captain Horace Percy Lale DSO, DFC & Bar (8 April 1886 – 5 April 1955) was a Royal Air Force officer and British World War I flying ace credited with 23 victories.

== First World War ==
Lale was commissioned a temporary second lieutenant in the Royal Flying Corps on 26 September 1916. He was appointed a flying officer in the RFC on 3 April 1917, and was appointed a flight commander with the temporary rank of captain on 10 February 1918. Lale was mentioned in despatches in March 1918.

== Interwar years and Second World War ==
Lale remained in the Royal Air Force after the war, receiving a permanent commission in the rank of flying officer on 1 August 1919. For distinguished service in the 1919-1920 Waziristan campaign, he was awarded a bar to his DFC in July 1920. He was promoted to flight lieutenant on 1 January 1921, to squadron leader on 1 January 1924 and to wing commander on 1 January 1930. He was promoted to group captain on 1 January 1936. He served through the start of the Second World War, but retired from the RAF on 8 April 1941.

== Citation for military decoration ==
Distinguished Flying Cross (DFC)

2nd Lieut. (A./Capt.) Horace Percy Lale. (FRANCE)

He has accounted for twelve enemy aeroplanes—five crashed, four shot down in flames, and three driven down out of control. On 6 September he led his patrol of nine machines to the assistance of some formations that were attacked by thirty or forty enemy aircraft; in the engagement he and his Observer accounted for two Fokkers; eventually the enemy was driven off, five of their machines being destroyed and three shot down out of control.
