= No. 20 Squadron RAF =

Ground-based squadron of the Royal Air Force

- Squadron badge
- Active: 1915–1918 (RFC); 1918–1947; 1949–1951; 1952–1960; 1961–1970; 1970–1992; 1992–2010; 2021 – present
- Country: United Kingdom
- Branch: Royal Air Force
- Type: Operational conversion unit
- Role: Control and Reporting Centre training
- Part of: Air Command and Control Force
- Station: RAF Boulmer
- Mottos: Facta non verba (Latin for 'Deeds not Words')

Insignia
- Roundel

No. 20 Squadron is a squadron of the Royal Air Force. Since June 2021, it has been the operational conversion unit for the RAF's Air Command and Control Force based at RAF Boulmer in Northumberland.

The squadron was previously a flying squadron, being the BAE Harrier operational conversion unit for Joint Force Harrier from September 1992 until March 2010 based at RAF Wittering.

== History ==
=== First World War (1915–1918) ===
No. 20 Squadron was formed on 1 September 1915 at Netheravon, Wiltshire, as part of the Royal Flying Corps (RFC). In 1915, the German, and French and British air services had increasingly fought each other in the air for control of the skies to conduct reconnaissance. Combined with an expansion of the British Army, this prompted an expansion of the Royal Flying Corps in the second half of 1915, during which No. 20 Squadron was formed from a nucleus of No. 7 Reserve Aeroplane Squadron under the command of Captain C W Wilson.

The squadron flew to France on 16 January 1916, landing first at Saint-Omer and moving the following week to Clairmarais. It was equipped with the Royal Aircraft Factory F.E.2b two-seat fighter-reconnaissance aircraft, which were replaced in June 1916 by the F.E.2d model, with an improved engine and armament. The squadron was part of the RFCs’ 2nd Brigade, working with the British 2nd Army, whose area of operations was around Ypres in Belgium. The squadron's tasks included offensive patrols, photography, reconnaissance, and bombing by day and night.

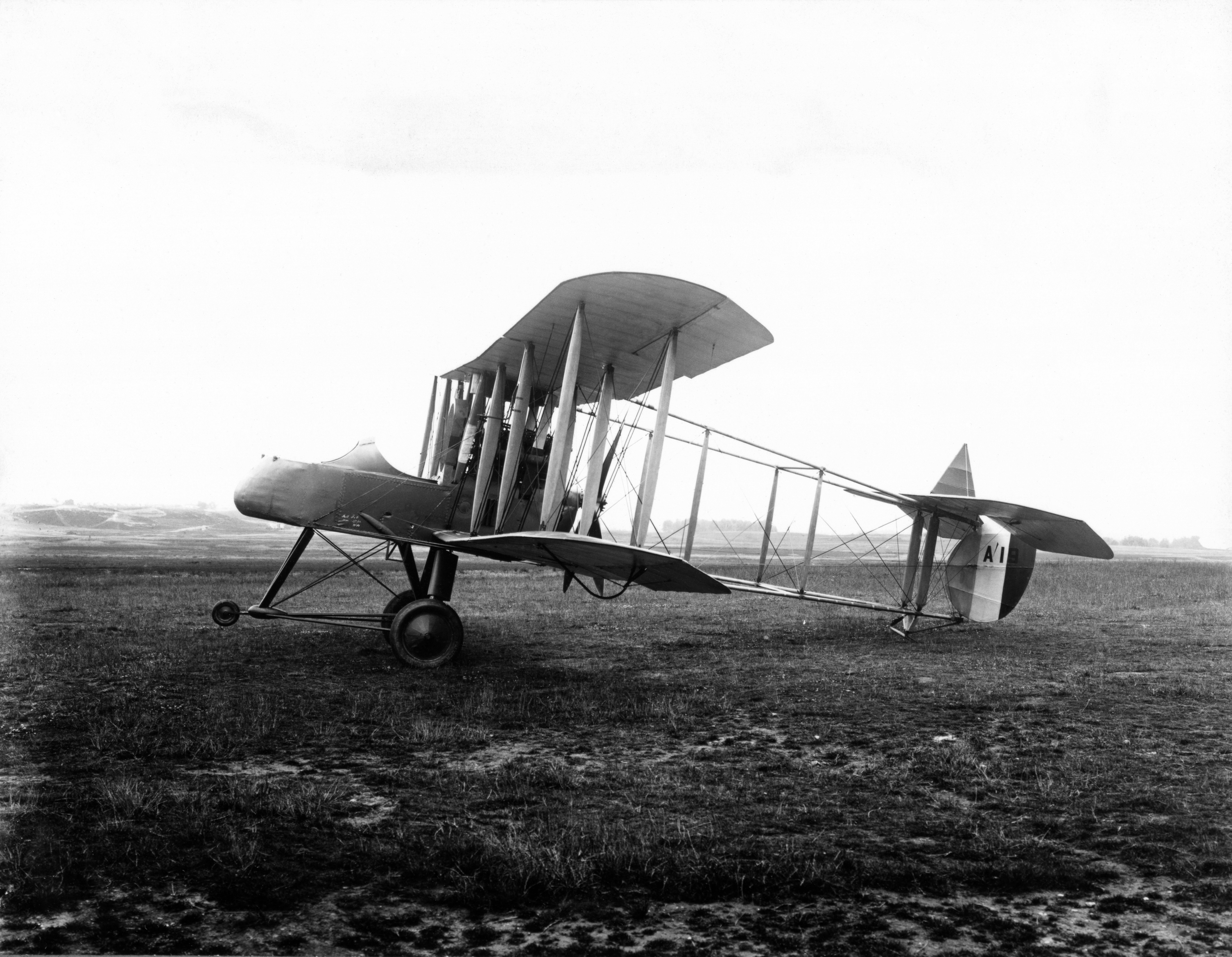
A Royal Aircraft Factory F.E.2d of the Royal Flying Corps

Of the squadron's 628 claimed combat victories, over 460 were confirmed by appearance in RFC official communiques. One of the most notable combat victories was that accredited to Second Lieutenant Woodbridge on 6 July 1917, who was the first British airman to wound German fighter-ace Manfred von Richthofen, when a No. 20 Squadron patrol was attacked by Richttofen's Jagdgeschwader 1.

The skill and courage exhibited by members of No. 20 Squadron throughout the war was reflected in 71 gallantry awards. In addition to 34 Military Crosses, nineteen Distinguished Flying Crosses, five Military Medals and other decorations, a Victoria Cross was posthumously awarded to Acting Flight Sergeant Thomas Mottershead, who died as a result of injuries sustained in combat on 7 January 1917.

The squadron continued to operate from the Saint-Omer area in support of the British Army around Ypres for most of the war, at airfields such as Boisdinghem and Saint Marie Cappel. On 21 September 1917, it completed its re-equipment with the replacement for the F.E.2d, the Bristol Fighter, which was to equip the squadron for the next fifteen years. The squadron conducted daily detached operations from Bruay, near Bethune during the major German offensive in March 1918, and moved further south to several airfields east of Amiens as allied armies moved forward during the 100 Days Offensive.

The squadron transferred from the Royal Flying Corps to the newly formed Royal Air Force in April 1918. After the Armistice on 11 November 1918, the squadron moved to Ossogne, east of Namur in Belgium, where it stayed until May 1919.

=== The Northwest Frontier (1919–1938) ===
After the Afghan Army invaded the Northwest Frontier province of India in early May 1919, No. 20 Squadron was ordered to sail for India as reinforcement for the two squadrons already in place. The squadron conducted similar air operations to those that they had undertaken on the Western Front in support of the army.

The squadron arrived at RAF Risalpur on 19 June 1919 and was the first squadron to fly the Bristol Fighter in India. Although the Afghan invasion had been defeated, the squadron was retained on the Northwest Frontier in the new role of air control. For most of the next 20 years, the squadron was mainly based at RAF Peshawar, with regular moves forward to locations such as Miranshah and Shabkadar.

The squadron developed new techniques of air control. Their Bristol fighters conducted reconnaissance, both independently and for the army in the field.

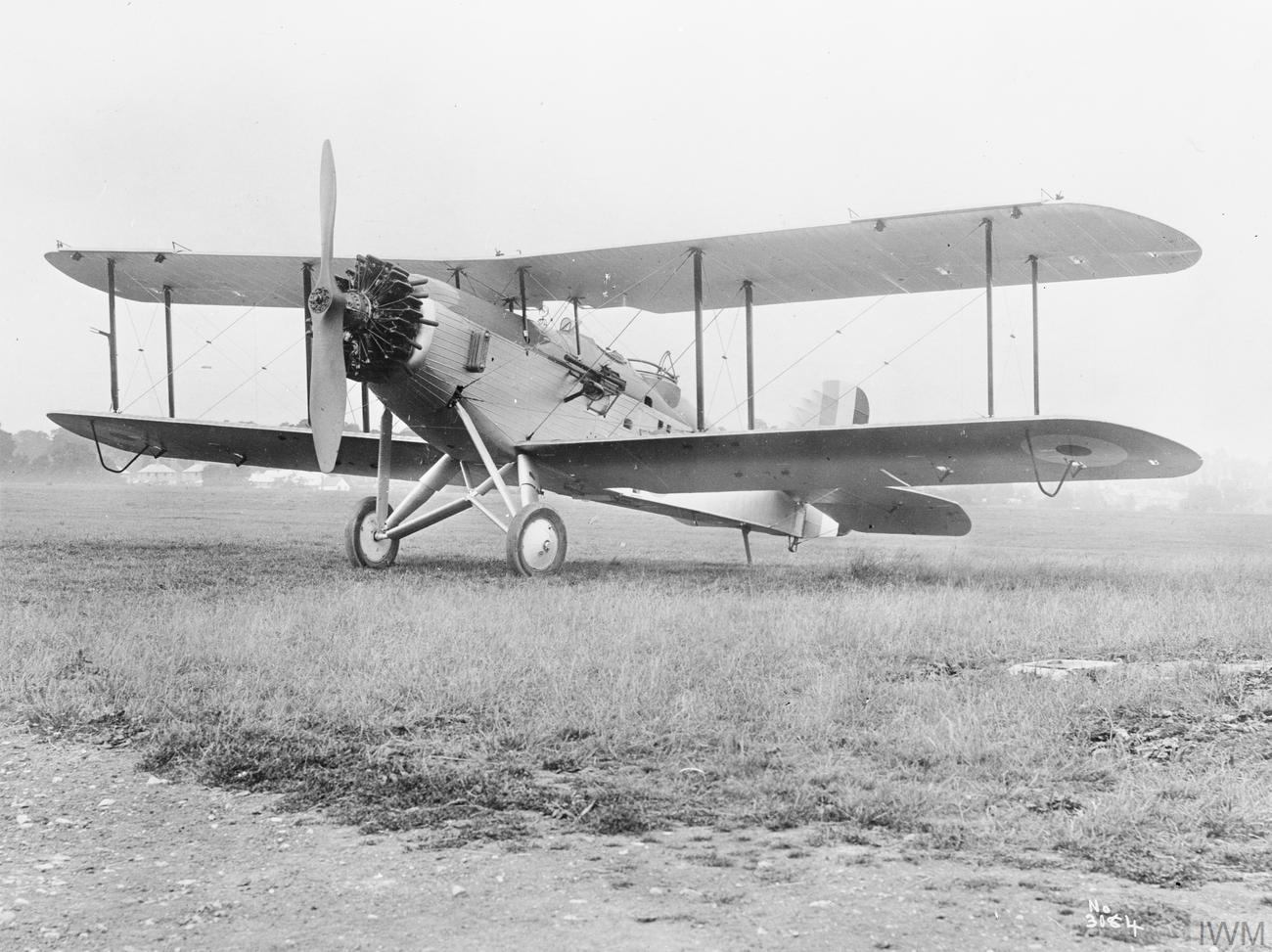
A Westland Wapiti two-seat general purpose biplane of the type operated by No. 20 Squadron during the 1930s

The squadron also undertook more peaceful and humanitarian roles. Two Westland Wapiti, on trial in India and flown by No. 20 Squadron crews, escorted Vickers Victoria and Airco DH.9 aircraft operated by the RAF which were conducted the Kabul airlift of 1929. They were the only aircraft on the North-West Frontier equipped with wireless telephony sets, which were used to maintain contact with Peshawar during the operation. The squadron responded to the large earthquake which hit Quetta on 31 May 1935. It also deployed nine aircraft to ferry medical personnel and supplies to and around the area and flew vaccines to Kabul on 19 August 1936.

In August 1928, the famous archaeologist, diplomat, army officer and writer T. E. Lawrence was posted to No. 20 Squadron, having joined the RAF as a non-commissioned airman. He served as a clerk at the squadron forward airfield at Miranshah until press stories emerged in London that he was conducting diplomacy and espionage in Afghanistan. As such news was likely to disturb the local political situation, he was posted from No. 20 Squadron on 8 January 1929, returning to the UK.

In 1932, No. 20 Squadron exchanged its Bristol Fighters for Westland Wapitis and these, in turn, were exchanged for Hawker Audaxes in December 1935.

=== Second World War (1939–1945) ===
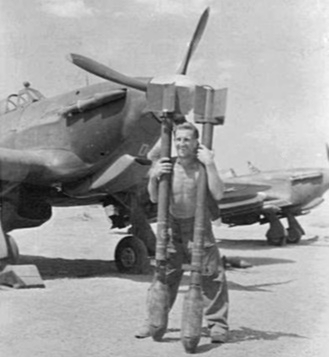
A member of No. 20 Squadron at Monywa, Central Burma, in 1945. He is holding two rockets, used by the Hawker Hurricane Mk.IV aircraft in the background.

During the early part of the Second World War, No. 20 Squadron continued its air control work on the Northwest Frontier. After Italy's entry to the war, defence of India's ports was assigned a higher priority; on 14 February 1941, A and B Flights moved to Bombay and Madras respectively to provide reconnaissance and attack for coastal defence. These flights re-joined the rest of the squadron at its new headquarters at RAF Secunderabad on 10 June 1941. The squadron re-equipped with the Westland Lysander in December 1941, remaining in the army co-operation role. After Japan's entry to the war on 7 December 1941, Japan attacked Burma in early 1942, forcing British forces to retreat towards India. No. 20 Squadron was moved closer to the Burmese front at RAF Jamshedpur on 1 May 1942 via a short stay at its previous home at RAF Peshawar.

For the remainder of 1942, the squadron was headquartered at Jamshedpur, moving 70 miles (110 kilometres) north to RAF Chharra in during December 1942 and remaining there until May 1943. During this time, the squadron continued to fly the Lysander in support of the army on the Burmese front. Although the Lysanders were old, somewhat unreliable and short of spare parts, the squadron maintained detachments at Imphal and Chittagong. Often unescorted, No. 20 Squadron Lysanders conducted armed reconnaissance and attack missions in Arakan, and in support of Chindit raiding activities in the Chindwin River Valley; they would fly at or below treetop height to avoid detection when Japanese fighters were nearby. The flight at Chittagong also conducted air-sea rescue missions. In May 1943, the squadron exchanged their Lysanders for the Hawker Hurricane IID; this variant of the Hurricane was armed with two 40 mm underwing cannons designed specifically for destroying tanks and armoured vehicles. The squadron moved to RAF Kalyan, near Bombay, for training on the new aircraft. The monsoon delayed completion of this training and it was December 1943 before the squadron was ready to move back into the line at Nidania.

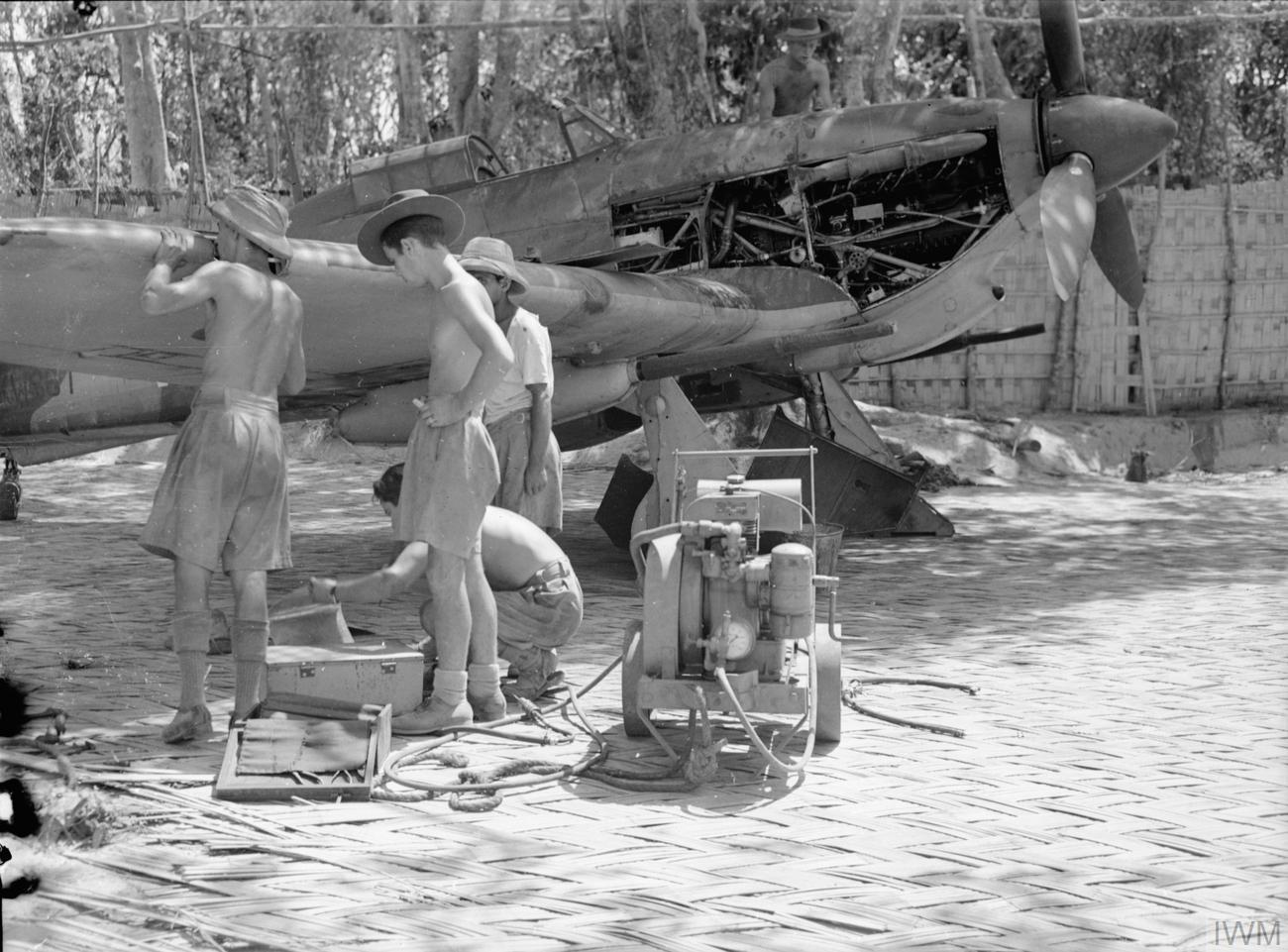
Ground crew servicing a Hawker Hurricane Mark II.D, of No. 20 Squadron at Nidania on the coast of Bengal, India during the Second World War

For the next seven months, No. 20 Squadron operated in turn from Nidania (codenamed ‘George’), Madhaibunia (codenamed ‘Hove’) and Chiringa, all in the North-West of Burma. As the only squadron equipped with the Hurricane IID in country, its primary targets were enemy armour, although most attacks were carried out against lines of communication, such as river boats and trucks. In April 1944, the squadron detached a flight to Lankipatti to fly anti-tank sorties during the Battle of Imphal.

The squadron moved to RAF Trichinopoly in July 1944, and RAF St Thomas Mount (now Chennai International Airport) outside Madras in September 1944 for rest, recuperation and further training. During the latter months of 1944, it also provided a detachment to Imphal to undertake aerial spraying with Hurricanes to minimise the spread of malaria.

In December 1944, A Flight converted to the rocket-projectile-armed Hurricane IV, before the squadron moved to a series of airfields in the central lowlands as Allied armies advanced rapidly through Mandalay, Meiktila and on to Rangoon, again attacking lines of communication and enemy strong-points, such as bunkers. After Rangoon was captured on 2 May, the squadron was stood down from operations on 8 May 1945 and moved back to RAF St Thomas Mount. The squadron was preparing for a move to the Far East when the Second World War came to an end.

=== Cold War (1945-1970) ===
In August and September 1945, No. 20 Squadron moved from RAF St Thomas Mount to RAF Amarda Road, where they re-equipped with the Supermarine Spitfire VIII, before moving to Don Muang, outside Bangkok, as the first RAF squadron based in Siam, now Thailand. In December 1945, the squadron exchanged the Spitfire VIII for the Spitfire XIV. By April 1946, the squadron had moved to RAF Agra and re-equipped with the Hawker Tempest FB.II, which it retained until its disbandment on 1 August 1947, two weeks before Indian independence.

From 1949 to 1951, the squadron was reformed from No. 631 Squadron at RAF Llanbedr in Gwynedd, flying a variety of aircraft in the anti-aircraft co-operation role, providing targets for anti-aircraft guns and simulating attacks on ground troops for their training. It moved to RAF Valley in Anglesey in July 1949, disbanding in September 1951.

The expansion of the RAF in Germany, as part of the increased tension between NATO and the Soviet Union and its satellites, led to the re-formation of No. 20 Squadron in June 1952 at RAF Jever in Lower Saxony, operating the de Havilland Vampire FB.9 in the air defence and ground attack roles. In late July 1952, the squadron moved to the re-constructed airfield at RAF Oldenburg. To counter the threat from the new Soviet Mig-15 fighter, the squadron re-equipped with the Canadair Sabre F.4 in 1953. In November 1955, it again re-equipped with the Hawker Hunter F.4, which was superseded by the Hunter F.6 in May 1957. The squadron disbanded on 20 December 1960, but its ‘numberplate’ was allocated to the RAF's Far East Air Force for future use.

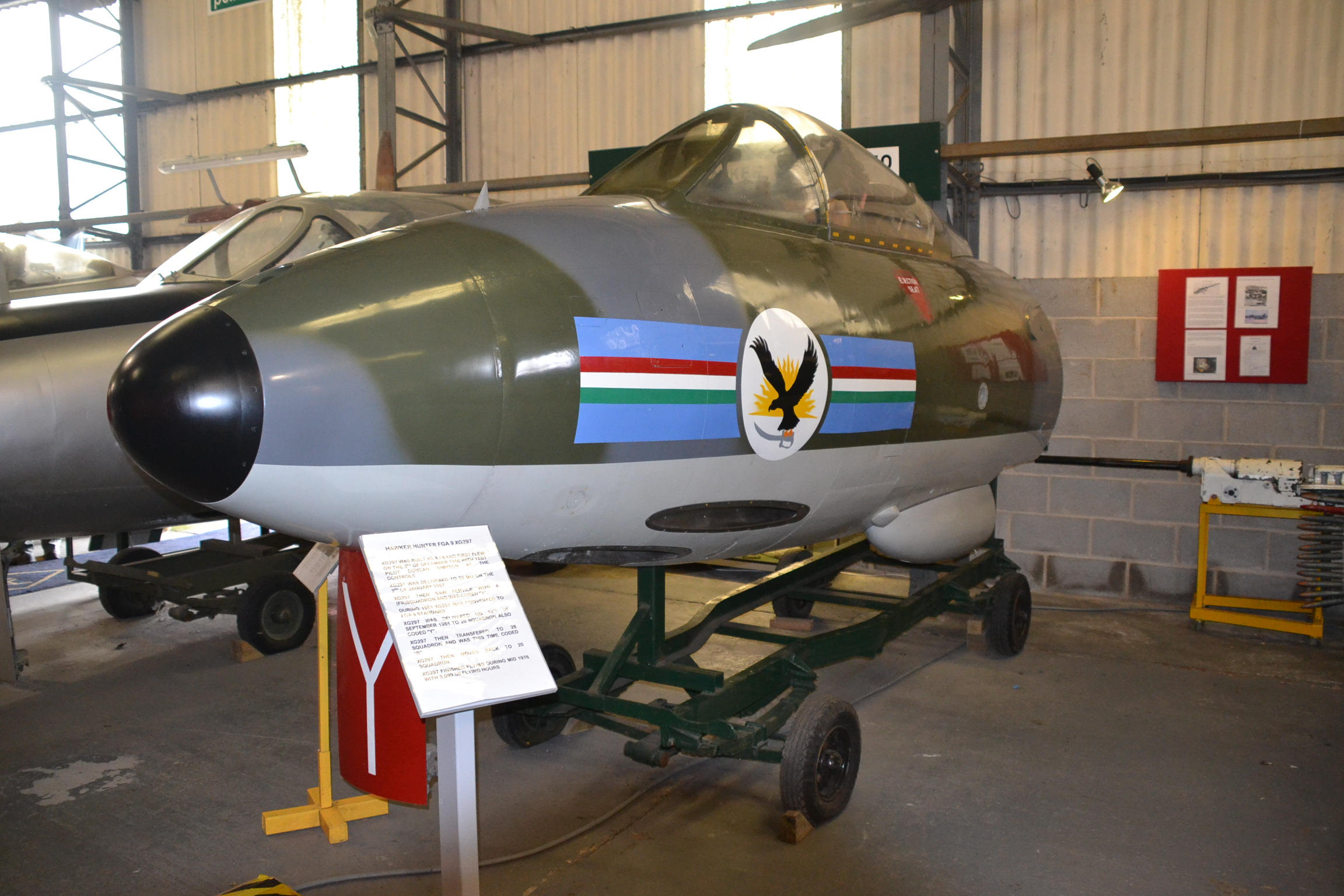
The front section of a Hawker Hunter FGA.9 with No. 20 Squadron markings at the South Yorkshire Aircraft Museum, Doncaster

In 1960, the Southeast Asia Treaty Organization's concerns about the situation in South-East Asia led to the RAF bolstering its presence in the area. No. 20 Squadron was reformed, equipped with the Hunter FGA.9, a specialist ground-attack version of the aircraft. The pilots of the reformed squadron collected their aircraft from the UK and flew them to RAF Tengah, Singapore, with the squadron fully in place by November 1960. For the next ten years, No. 20 Squadron remained at Tengah. Routine training in Singapore and Malaysia maintained proficiency in its various roles, while detachments took place at various times to Hong Kong, Don Muang, Korat and Butterworth. During the Indonesian Confrontation between 1963 and 1966, the squadron deployed aircraft to Labuan and Kuching providing attack and air defence against incursions into Malaysia by land, sea and air. The squadron established a new flight in 1969, when No. 209 Squadron at RAF Seletar disbanded, absorbing three of its Scottish Aviation Pioneer short take-off and landing aircraft for forward air control duties in support of its Hunters. In 1968, the British government announced it would withdraw from ‘East of Suez’ by 1971, which led to the disbandment of No. 20 Squadron in February 1970.

=== The Cold War (1970–1992) ===
No. 20 Squadron reformed in Germany on 1 December 1970 as the second Hawker Siddeley Harrier GR.1 squadron based at RAF Wildenrath. It was declared to NATO in an offensive support role and re-equipped with the Harrier GR.3 in 1975. The GR.3 variant introduced laser ranging and target marking equipment in the nose of the aircraft and a radar warning receiver. Two years later, the RAF rationalised its Harrier squadrons in Germany by sharing all Harrier aircraft between two, rather than three, squadrons, and No. 20 Squadron was selected to pass its Harriers to No. 4 Squadron at RAF Gütersloh at the end of February 1977.

The squadron reformed the following day at RAF Brüggen, equipped with twelve SEPECATJaguar GR1, again providing offensive support to NATO forces in West Germany. In addition to its conventional weapons, the squadron had eight WE.177 tactical nuclear bombs for use if a future European conflict escalated to the use of nuclear weapons. The apparent mismatch between eight nuclear bombs and twelve aircraft was because RAF staff planners expected up to one third attrition in the initial conventional phase, with sufficient aircraft held back in reserve to deliver the full stock of nuclear weapons to targets beyond the forward edge of the battlefield, deep into the enemy's rear areas. The squadron was assigned to NATO for operational and targeting purposes, although political control over release of the British-owned WE.177 weapons was retained by the British government.

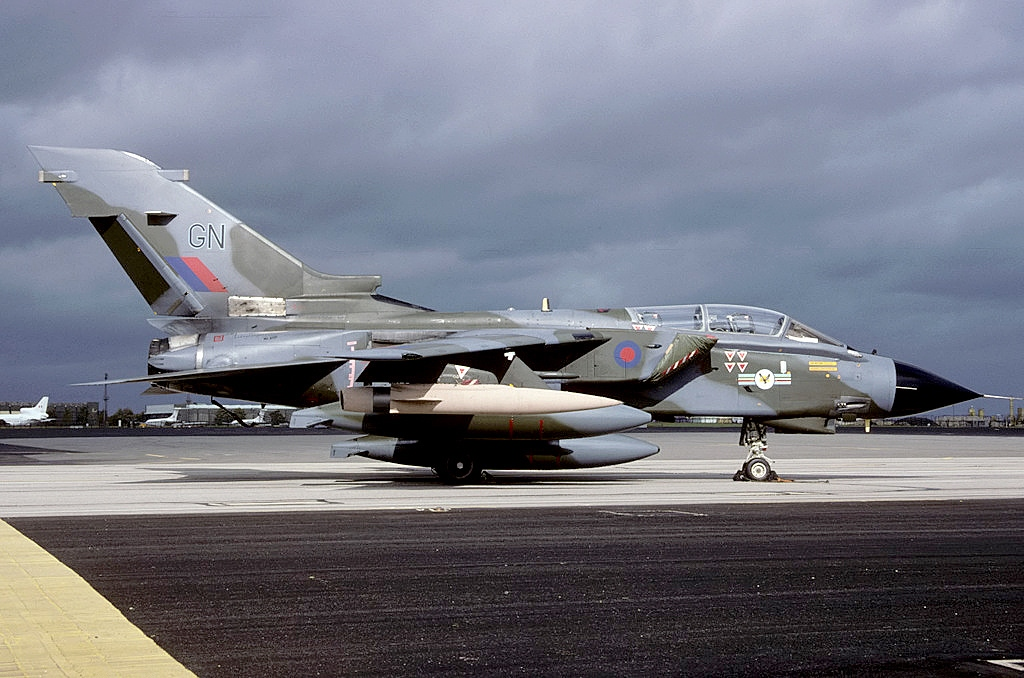
A Panavia Tornado GR1 in No. 20 Squadron markings in 1990

On 30 June 1984,No. 20 Squadron re-equipped with the Panavia Tornado GR1 at RAF Laarbruch, retaining its offensive support role and increasing its stock of WE.177 nuclear weapons to eighteen, due to the Tornado's greater payload.

In November 1990, the squadron deployed to Tabuk Air Base, Saudi Arabia, as part of the 1991 Gulf War, the British contribution being known as Operation Granby. The squadron was responsible for attacks on Iraqi airfields at low- and medium-levels, and also introduced the new ALARM anti-radiation missile into operational service. The squadron returned to Laarbruch in March 1991.

As part of the 1991 defence review, Options for Change, the RAF reduced the number of bases it operated from in Germany from four to two; resulting in the disbandment of No. 20 Squadron as a Tornado squadron on 31 July 1992.

=== Harrier (1992–2010) ===
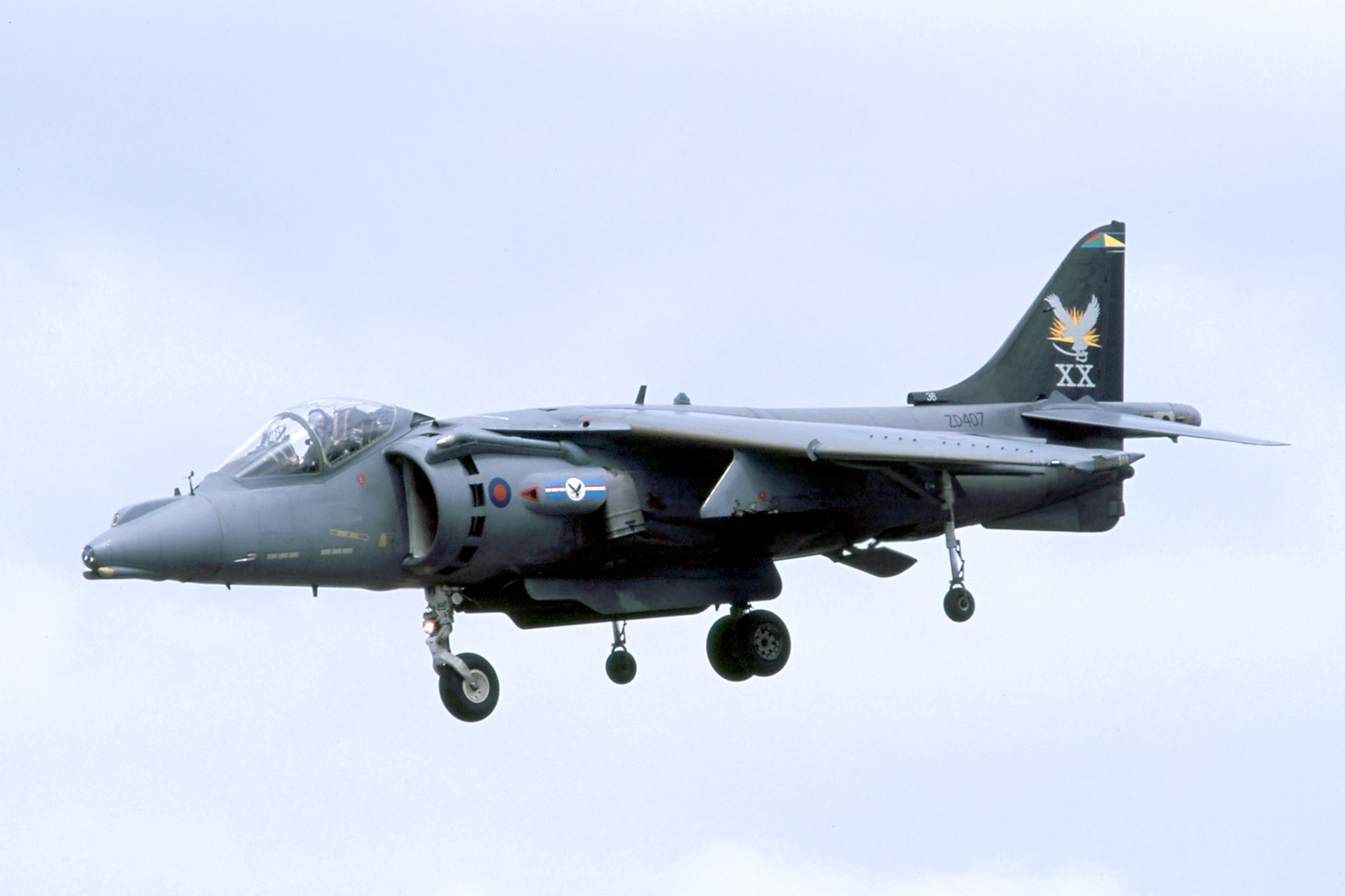
A British Aerospace Harrier GR7 in No. 20 Squadron special markings in 2004

On 1 September 1992, No. 233 Operational Conversion Unit (OCU) based at RAF Wittering in Cambridgeshire and flying the Hawker Siddley Harrier was renumbered No. 20 (Reserve) Squadron. The ‘reserve’ title indicated that, although the squadron was not a front-line unit, its staff, aircraft and equipment could be used for operations should the need arise.

The RAF's Harrier squadrons, including No. 20 Squadron, were brought together with the Sea Harrier squadrons of the Fleet Air Arm to come under the control of Joint Force Harrier on 1 April 2000. The squadron remained at Wittering for the next ten years. In 2010, Joint Force Harrier was reduced by one squadron. No. 4 Squadron was disbanded as a frontline squadron but, as it had greater seniority, its number was assigned to the OCU as No. 4 (Reserve) Squadron, which led to No. 20 Squadron's disbandment on 31 March 2010. Joint Force Harrier's disbandment unexpectedly followed as part of the Strategic Defence and Security Review which was published on 19 October 2010.

=== Air Surveillance and Control System (2021 – present) ===
On 1 June 2021, the RAF awarded the No. 20 Squadron number plate to the Air Surveillance and Control System (ASACS) operational conversion unit based at RAF Boulmer in Northumberland. The squadron's reformation was celebrated officially at a joint reformation parade with No. 19 Squadron on 15 June 2022, which was held at Alnwick Castle. No. 20 Squadron provides basic and advanced air battle management training to British Armed Forces personnel whose role it is to monitor, detect and identify all aircraft in and around UK airspace; and coordinate Quick Reaction Alert aircraft tasked by the UK or NATO.

== Aircraft operated ==
- Royal Aircraft Factory F.E.2B
- Bristol F.2 Fighter
- Westland Wapiti
- Hawker Audax
- Westland Lysander
- Hawker Hurricane
- Supermarine Spitfire
- Hawker Tempest
- de Havilland Vampire
- Canadair Sabre
- Hawker Hunter
- Hawker Siddeley Harrier
- SEPECAT Jaguar
- Panavia Tornado

== Heritage ==
The squadron's badge features in front of the rising sun, an eagle, wings elevated and perched on a sword. The rising sun represents the squadron's long association with Asia (the east where the sun rises). The eagle is used to represent the air force, the black eagle depicted being a species native to the uplands of India and able to stay airborne for extended periods. The sword is a talwar, a type of Indian curved sabre which relates to both the squadron’s links to India, and its cooperation with the army. The badge was approved by King George VI in June 1937.

The squadron's motto is Facta non verba (Latin for 'Deeds not Words').

== Battle honours ==
No. 20 Squadron has received the following battle honours. Those marked with an asterisk (*) may be emblazoned on the squadron standard.

- Western Front (1914–1918)
- Somme (1916)*
- Arras (1917)*
- Ypres (1917)*
- Somme (1918)*
- Lys (1918)
- Hindenburg Line
- Mahsud (1919–1920)
- Waziristan (1919–1925)
- Mohmand (1927)
- North-West Frontier (1930–1931)
- Mohmand (1933)
- North-West Frontier (1935–1939)
- North Burma (1943–1944)*
- Arakan (1943–1944)*
- Manipur (1944)*
- Burma (1944–1945)*
- Gulf (1991)

== See also ==
- List of Royal Air Force aircraft squadrons
