= List of World War I aces credited with 15–19 victories =

The term ace (now commonly flying ace) was first used by French newspapers during World War I, describing Adolphe Pégoud as l'as ('the ace'), after he downed five German aircraft. When aircraft began to shoot or force down other aircraft, systems to count "air victories" were subsequently developed. The American qualification of five victories eventually became the standard, even though other air services had previously used differing figures.

While "ace" status was most often won by fighter pilots, bomber and reconnaissance crews, and observers in two-seater aircraft such as the Bristol F.2b ("Bristol Fighter"), also destroyed enemy aircraft. If a two-seater aircraft destroyed an aircraft, both crew members were credited with a victory. Because pilots usually teamed with differing observer/gunners in two-seater aircraft, an observer might be an ace when his pilot was not, and vice versa. The few aces among combat aviators have historically accounted for the majority of air-to-air victories in military history.

Loss of records by mischance and the passage of time complicates reconstructing the actual count for given aces. The scores presented in the list cannot be definitive, but are based on itemized lists that are the best available sources of information. Aces are listed after verifying the date and location of combat, and the foe vanquished, for every victory accredited by an aviator's home air service using their own aerial victory standards. Those victories for which the evidence is unavailable or fragmentary have been excluded from the victory count.

== Aces ==
This along with the symbolic dagger †, indicates that the pilot was known to be either killed in action, missing in action, died of wounds, or killed in a flying accident during World War I.

Name	Country	Air service(s)	Victories	Notes
Horace Barton	South Africa	Royal Flying Corps	19	Distinguished Flying Cross with Bar.
Wilfred Beaver	Canada	Royal Flying Corps, Royal Air Force	19	Military Cross
Andrew Cowper	Australia	Royal Flying Corps	19	Military Cross with two Bars.
Christian Donhauser	German Empire	Luftstreitkräfte	19	Military Merit Cross, Iron Cross
Jacques Ehrlich	France	Aéronautique Militaire	19	Médaille militaire, Croix de Guerre
Arthur Bradfield Fairclough	Canada	Royal Flying Corps, Royal Air Force	19	Military Cross
Gerhard Fieseler	German Empire	Luftstreitkräfte	19	Military Merit Cross, Iron Cross
Henri Hay De Slade	France	Aéronautique Militaire	19	Légion d'honneur, Croix de Guerre with 14 Palmes, Belgian Croix de guerre, British Military Cross, Italian Croix de la Couronne
Cedric Howell	Australia	Royal Flying Corps	19	Distinguished Service Order, Military Cross, Distinguished Flying Cross
József Kiss†	Austria-Hungary	Luftfahrtruppen	19 (Note: Possibly 21.)	Top Hungarian ace. Medal for Bravery (1 Gold, 1 Silver)
Harold Albert Kullberg	United States	Royal Flying Corps, Royal Air Force	19	British Distinguished Flying Cross
Leslie Powell	United Kingdom	Royal Flying Corps	19	Military Cross with Bar.
Arthur Reed (aviator)†	South Africa	Royal Flying Corps	19	Distinguished Flying Cross with Bar.
Ellis Vair Reid†	Canada	Royal Naval Air Service	19	Distinguished Service Cross
Alan Wilkinson (aviator)	United Kingdom	Royal Flying Corps	19	Distinguished Service Order with Bar.
Kurt Wintgens†	German Empire	Luftstreitkräfte	19	First aerial victory ever with a synchronized machine gun. Pour le Mérite, Iron Cross
Alexander Zenzes	German Empire	Luftstreitkräfte	19	Iron Cross
Hartmuth Baldamus†	German Empire	Luftstreitkräfte	18	Royal House Order of Hohenzollern, Iron Cross
Bernard Barny De Romanet	France	Aéronautique Militaire	18	Légion d'honneur, Médaille militaire, Croix de Guerre with ten Palmes and three étoiles de vermeil
James Belgrave†	United Kingdom	Royal Flying Corps	18	Military Cross with Bar.
Franz Gräser	Austria-Hungary	Luftfahrtruppen	18	Order of Leopold, Order of the Iron Crown, Medal for Bravery
Franz Hemer	German Empire	Luftstreitkräfte	18	Royal House Order of Hohenzollern, Iron Cross
William C. Lambert	United States	Royal Flying Corps, Royal Air Force	18	British Distinguished Flying Cross
Frank Luke†	United States	US Army Air Service	18	Medal of Honor, Distinguished Flying Cross, Italian War Cross "The Balloon Buster"
George Chisholm MacKay	Canada	Royal Naval Air Service, Royal Air Force	18	Distinguished Flying Cross, Belgian Order of Leopold, French Légion d'honneur, French Croix de Guerre
William Molesworth	United Kingdom	Royal Flying Corps	18	Military Cross with Bar, Italian Medal for Military Valor.
Maurice Newnham	United Kingdom	Royal Flying Corps	18	Distinguished Flying Cross, French Croix de Guerre
Emil Schäpe	German Empire	Luftstreitkräfte	18	Iron Cross
John Todd	United Kingdom	Royal Flying Corps	18	Distinguished Flying Cross, Military Cross
John Lightfoot Trollope	United Kingdom	Royal Flying Corps	18	Military Cross with Bar
Ronald Bannerman	New Zealand	Royal Flying Corps	17	Distinguished Flying Cross
Fritz Beckhardt	German Empire	Luftstreitkräfte	17	Royal House Order of Hohenzollern, Iron Cross
Hans Böhning	German Empire	Luftstreitkräfte	17	Iron Cross
Walter Böning	German Empire	Luftstreitkräfte	17	Royal House Order of Hohenzollern, Iron Cross
Alfred Williams Carter	Canada	Royal Naval Air Service, Royal Air Force	17	Distinguished Flying Cross
Marziale Cerutti	Italy	Corpo Aeronautico Militare	17	
Carl Frederick Falkenberg	Canada	Royal Flying Corps, Royal Air Force	17	Distinguished Flying Cross with Bar, Air Force Cross
George Everard Gibbons	United Kingdom	Royal Flying Corps	17	Military Cross, Distinguished Flying Cross
Ernst Hess†	German Empire	Luftstreitkräfte	17	Royal House Order of Hohenzollern, Iron Cross
Fred Parkinson Holliday	Australia	Australian Flying Corps	17	Distinguished Service Order, Military Cross, Air Force Cross
August Iaccaci	United States	Royal Flying Corps, Royal Air Force	17	Distinguished Flying Cross
Paul Iaccaci	United States	Royal Flying Corps, Royal Air Force	17	Distinguished Flying Cross
Edward Grahame Johnstone	United Kingdom	Royal Flying Corps	17	Distinguished Service Cross
Rudolf Klimke†	German Empire	Luftstreitkräfte	17	Iron Cross
Reginald Makepeace†	United Kingdom	Royal Flying Corps	17	Military Cross
John Pinder	United Kingdom	Royal Flying Corps	17	Distinguished Flying Cross
Karl Plauth	German Empire	Luftstreitkräfte	17	Iron Cross
Ferruccio Ranza	Italy	Corpo Aeronautico Militare	17	Three Silver awards of Medal for Military Valor, Military Order of Savoy, French Croix de guerre and Belgian Croix de guerre, Serbian Star of Karageogevich
Franz Ray	German Empire	Luftstreitkräfte	17	
Hans Rolfes	German Empire	Luftstreitkräfte	17	Royal House Order of Hohenzollern, Iron Cross
Josef Schwendemann	German Empire	Luftstreitkräfte	17	Military Merit Cross
Edwin Swale	United Kingdom	Royal Naval Air Service, Royal Air Force	17	Distinguished Flying Cross
Edmund Tempest	United Kingdom	Royal Flying Corps	17	Military Cross, Distinguished Flying Cross
Walter Tyrrell†	United Kingdom	Royal Flying Corps	17	Military Cross
Owen Baldwin	United Kingdom	Royal Flying Corps	16	Distinguished Flying Cross, French Légion d'honneur, French Croix de Guerre
Gerald Gordon Bell	Canada	Royal Flying Corps, Royal Air Force	16	Distinguished Flying Cross, French Légion d'honneur, French Croix de Guerre
Eugen Bönsch	Austria-Hungary	Luftfahrtruppen	16	Medal for Bravery (3 Gold awards)
Ernst Bormann	German Empire	Luftstreitkräfte	16	Iron Cross First and Second Class, with Clasps. Knight's Cross and Oak Leaves for Iron Cross. Generalmajor in World War II.
Henry John Burden	Canada	Royal Flying Corps, Royal Air Force	16	Distinguished Service Order, Distinguished Flying Cross
Jean Chaput†	France	Aéronautique Militaire	16	Légion d'honneur, Médaille militaire, Croix de Guerre with 11 Palmes, Belgian Croix de guerre, British Military Cross
John Stanley Chick	United Kingdom	Royal Flying Corps, Royal Air Force	16	Military Cross Rose to Air Commodore in RAF
Eugene Coler	United States	Royal Flying Corps, Royal Air Force	16	British Distinguished Flying Cross
John Cowell†	United Kingdom	Royal Flying Corps	16	Distinguished Conduct Medal, Military Medal
Bruce Digby-Worsley	United Kingdom	Royal Flying Corps	16	
Stearne Tighe Edwards	Canada	Royal Naval Air Service, Royal Air Force	16	Distinguished Service Cross with Bar
Ernest Elton	United Kingdom	Royal Flying Corps	16	Distinguished Conduct Medal, Military Medal, Italian Medal for Military Valor
Stefan Fejes	Austria-Hungary	Luftfahrtruppen	16	Gold Medal for Bravery (three awards), 1st Class Silver Medal for Bravery (2 awards), 2nd Class Silver Medal for Bravery
Robert Foster	United Kingdom	Royal Flying Corps	16	Knight of the Order of the Bath, Order of the British Empire, Distinguished Flying Cross. Rose to Air Chief Marshal.
Robert Grosvenor	United Kingdom	Royal Flying Corps	16	Military Cross
Ludwig Hanstein†	German Empire	Luftstreitkräfte	16	Royal House Order of Hohenzollern
Allan Hepburn	Australia	Royal Flying Corps, Royal Air Force	16	Distinguished Flying Cross
Sidney Highwood	United Kingdom	Royal Flying Corps	16	Distinguished Flying Cross
Frank Johnson	United Kingdom	Royal Flying Corps	16	Distinguished Conduct Medal with Bar
Johannes Klein	German Empire	Luftstreitkräfte	16	Royal House Order of Hohenzollern, Iron Cross
Raoul Lufbery	France; United States	Aéronautique Militaire; US Army Air Service	16	French Légion d'honneur, Médaille militaire, and Croix de Guerre with ten Palmes, British Military Medal, Montenegrin Medal for Military Valor.
Karl Odebrett	German Empire	Luftstreitkräfte	16 (Note: Claimed, but unconfirmed, 5 more.)	Royal House Order of Hohenzollern, Iron Cross, Austro-Hungarian Medal for Bravery
Oliver Redgate	United Kingdom	Royal Flying Corps	16	Distinguished Flying Cross
Oren Rose	United States	Royal Flying Corps, Royal Air Force	16	Distinguished Flying Cross with Bar
Wilhelm Seitz	German Empire	Luftstreitkräfte	16	Iron Cross
Francis Smith	Australia	Australian Flying Corps	16	Military Cross, Distinguished Flying Cross
Elliott White Springs	United States	Royal Flying Corps, Royal Air Force, US Army Air Service	16	American Distinguished Service Cross, British Distinguished Flying Cross
David Stewart	United Kingdom	Royal Flying Corps	16	Military Cross with Bar, Distinguished Flying Cross
Christoffel Venter	South Africa	Royal Flying Corps	16	Order of the Bath, Distinguished Flying Cross with Bar. Rose to Major General.
Anthony Wall	United Kingdom	Royal Flying Corps	16	Military Cross with Bar
Hans Weiss†	German Empire	Luftstreitkräfte	16	Royal House Order of Hohenzollern, Iron Cross
Vasili Yanchenko	Russia	Imperial Army Air Service	16	Order of Saint George, Cross of Saint George (1st, 2nd, 3rd, and 4th Class), Order of Saint Vladimir, Order of Saint Anne, Order of the Star, Military Service Medal
Pavel Argeyev	Russia	Aéronautique Militaire, Imperial Army Air Service	15	French Légion d'honneur, French Croix de Guerre, Order of Saint George, Order of Saint Vladimir, Order of Saint Anne
Karl Bohnenkamp	German Empire	Luftstreitkräfte	15	Military Merit Cross
Lawrence Coombes	United Kingdom	Royal Naval Air Service, Royal Air Force	15	Distinguished Flying Cross
Cyril Crowe	United Kingdom	Royal Flying Corps, Royal Air Force	15	Military Cross, Distinguished Flying Cross
Charles Cudemore	United Kingdom	Royal Flying Corps, Royal Air Force	15	Military Cross, Distinguished Flying Cross
Ralph Curtis†	United Kingdom	Royal Flying Corps	15	
Ernest Deighton	United Kingdom	Royal Flying Corps, Royal Air Force	15	Distinguished Conduct Medal
Armand De Turenne	France	Aéronautique Militaire	15	Légion d'honneur, Croix de Guerre with 11 Palmes and an étoile de bronze, British Military Cross, Belgian Croix de guerre, Italian Croce di guerre
Albert Dossenbach	German Empire	Luftstreitkräfte	15	Pour le Mérite, Military Merit Cross, Royal House Order of Hohenzollern, Iron Cross
Rudolf Francke	German Empire	Luftstreitkräfte	15	Military Merit Cross
George Gates	United Kingdom	Royal Naval Air Service, Royal Air Force	15	Distinguished Flying Cross
James Alpheus Glen	Canada	Royal Naval Air Service, Royal Air Force	15	Distinguished Service Cross with Bar, French Croix de Guerre
Harry King Goode	United Kingdom	Royal Flying Corps, Royal Air Force	15	Distinguished Service Order, Distinguished Flying Cross
John Rutherford Gordon	Australia	Australian Flying Corps	15	Military Cross
John Edmund Greene†	Canada	Royal Naval Air Service, Royal Air Force	15	Distinguished Flying Cross
Albert Haussmann†	German Empire	Luftstreitkräfte	15	
Edwin Hayne	South Africa	Royal Naval Air Service, Royal Air Force	15	Distinguished Service Cross, Distinguished Flying Cross
Alois Heldmann	German Empire	Luftstreitkräfte	15	Royal House Order of Hohenzollern, Iron Cross
Frank Hobson	United Kingdom	Royal Flying Corps, Royal Air Force	15	Military Cross
Max Immelmann†	German Empire	Luftstreitkräfte	15< (Note: Involved in shooting down two final aircraft the day he was killed, but strict scoring gave the kills to other pilots.)	Pour le Mérite, Military Order of St. Henry, Royal House Order of Hohenzollern, Iron Cross; The Immelmann turn named after him.
John Jones	United Kingdom	Royal Flying Corps, Royal Air Force	15	Distinguished Flying Medal
Andrew Kiddie	South Africa	Royal Flying Corps, Royal Air Force	15	Distinguished Flying Cross, Belgian Croix de guerre
Otto Löffler	German Empire	Luftstreitkräfte	15	
Hans-Georg von der Marwitz	German Empire	Luftstreitkräfte	15	Royal House Order of Hohenzollern, Iron Cross
Harold Mellings†	United Kingdom	Royal Naval Air Service, Royal Air Force	15	Distinguished Service Cross with Bar, Distinguished Flying Cross, Greek Royal Order of the Redeemer.
Alfred Mills	United Kingdom	Royal Flying Corps, Royal Air Force	15	Distinguished Flying Cross
Edmund Nathanael†	German Empire	Luftstreitkräfte	15	Iron Cross
Wilhelm Neuenhofen	German Empire	Luftstreitkräfte	15	
Roy Cecil Phillipps	Australia	Australian Flying Corps	15	Military Cross with Bar, Distinguished Flying Cross
Viktor von Pressentin von Rautter†	German Empire	Luftstreitkräfte	15	Military Merit Cross, Iron Cross
Theodor Quandt	German Empire	Luftstreitkräfte	15	Royal House Order of Hohenzollern
Herbert Richardson	United Kingdom	Royal Flying Corps, Royal Air Force	15	Military Cross, Distinguished Flying Cross
Gilbert Sardier	France	Aéronautique Militaire	15	Légion d'honneur, Médaille militaire, Croix de Guerre with nine Palmes, an étoile de vermeil, and an étoile d'argent, British Military Cross
Hugh Saunders	South Africa	Royal Flying Corps, Royal Air Force	15	Order of the Bath, Order of the British Empire, Military Cross, Distinguished Flying Cross with Bar, Military Medal
Julius Schmidt	German Empire	Luftstreitkräfte	15	Military Order of St. Henry, Royal House Order of Hohenzollern, Iron Cross
Kurt Schneider†	German Empire	Luftstreitkräfte	15	Military Order of St. Henry, Iron Cross
Harold Stackard	United Kingdom	Royal Naval Air Service	15	
Paul Strähle	German Empire	Luftstreitkräfte	15	Royal House Order of Hohenzollern, Iron Cross
Ernst Strohschneider	Austria-Hungary	Luftfahrtruppen	15	Order of Leopold, Silver Military Merit Medal, Military Merit Cross (2 awards), Iron Cross
Frank Weare	United Kingdom	Royal Flying Corps, Royal Air Force	15	Military Cross
