= George S. L. Hayward =

English World War I aerial observer

George Searle Lomax Hayward
- Born: 1 November 1894; Tunbridge Wells, Kent, England
- Died: 16 August 1924 (aged 29); Digby, Lincolnshire, England
- Military career
- Allegiance: United Kingdom
- Branch: British Army; Royal Air Force
- Rank: Flying Officer
- Units: 3rd Hussars; Royal West Kent Regiment; No. 22 Squadron RFC/RAF
- Conflicts: World War I; Western Front
- Awards: Military Cross

Flying Officer George Searle Lomax Hayward MC (1 November 1894 – 16 August 1924) was an English World War I aerial observer credited with 24 victories. He served as an observer/gunner for fellow aces Frank Weare, Ernest Elton, and William Lewis Wells. Hayward scored the bulk of his wins, 22 of them, between 6 March and 22 April 1918, usually scoring two or three times in the same fight.

== World War I service ==
Hayward originally enlisted in the 3rd Hussars, becoming a lance corporal. On 28 September 1916 he was commissioned as a second lieutenant in the Royal West Kent Regiment. In late 1917 he transferred to the Royal Flying Corps, being appointed a flying officer (observer) on 6 December, with seniority from 23 October. Posted to No. 22 Squadron RFC, he scored twenty-four victories as an observer in the Bristol F.2 Fighter, between November 1917 and April 1918.

List of aerial victories
No.	Date	Opponent	Location	Pilot
1	29 November 1917	Two-seater	North-west of Lille	2nd Lieutenant W. G. Pudney
2	6 December 1917	Albatros D.V	Haubourdin	2nd Lieutenant W. G. Pudney
3	6 March 1918	Albatros D.V	Douai	Sergeant Ernest Elton
4	6 March 1918	Albatros D.V	South-east of Douai	Sergeant Ernest Elton
5	11 March 1918	Albatros D.V	Vendeville–Faches	Sergeant Ernest Elton
6	11 March 1918	Albatros D.V	Knokke	Sergeant Ernest Elton
7	13 March 1918	Pfalz D.III	South-west of Lille	Sergeant Ernest Elton
8	13 March 1918	Pfalz D.III	South-west of Lille	Sergeant Ernest Elton
9	16 March 1918	Pfalz D.III	Oignies	Lieutenant William Wells
10	16 March 1918	Pfalz D.III	Oignies	Lieutenant William Wells
11	16 March 1918	Albatros D.V	Beaumont	Lieutenant William Wells
12	18 March 1918	Albatros D.V	Carvin	2nd Lieutenant Frank Weare
13	24 March 1918	Albatros D.V	Chérisy	2nd Lieutenant Frank Weare
14	24 March 1918	Albatros D.V	Vis-en-Artois	2nd Lieutenant Frank Weare
15	26 March 1918	Pfalz D.III	East of Albert	2nd Lieutenant Frank Weare
16	26 March 1918	Pfalz D.III	East of Albert	2nd Lieutenant Frank Weare
17	29 March 1918	Albatros D.V	Guillaucourt	2nd Lieutenant Frank Weare
18	2 April 1918	Albatros D.V	Vauvillers	2nd Lieutenant Frank Weare
19	2 April 1918	Fokker Dr.I	Vauvillers	2nd Lieutenant Frank Weare
20	12 April 1918	Pfalz D.III	South-west of Sailly	2nd Lieutenant Frank Weare
21	12 April 1918	Pfalz D.III	South-west of Sailly	2nd Lieutenant Frank Weare
22	12 April 1918	Pfalz D.III	Sailly	2nd Lieutenant Frank Weare
23	22 April 1918	Albatros D.V	East of Merville	2nd Lieutenant Frank Weare
24	22 April 1918	Albatros D.V	East of Merville	2nd Lieutenant Frank Weare

In July 1918 he was awarded the Military Cross. His citation read:

Temporary Second Lieutenant George Searle Lomax Hayward, Royal West Kent Regiment, attached Royal Flying Corps.

For conspicuous gallantry and devotion to duty. On three separate occasions when engaged with large hostile formations, he has attacked and sent crashing to earth two hostile machines on each occasion. He has displayed consistent skill, courage and determination in dealing with hostile aircraft.

== Post-war career ==
Hayward left the Royal Air Force on 17 May 1919, when he was transferred to the unemployed list. However, on 24 October 1919 he was granted a short-service commission in the RAF as an observer officer.

By early 1920 he was in India surveying the main civil air route between Delhi and Karachi. On 1 December 1923 Hayward, by now a Flying Officer, was posted to the RAF Depot, pending assignment, and on 1 March 1924 he was posted to No. 2 Flying Training School at RAF Duxford.

=== Death ===
No.2 FTS moved to RAF Digby, Lincolnshire, in June 1924. There, on 15 August, Hayward was instructing Pilot Officer Charles Victor Breakey in an Avro 504K, when their aircraft suffered an engine failure and plunged into the ground. Both men died later that day from their injuries.

== Bibliography ==
- Guttman, Jon & Dempsey, Harry (2007). Bristol F2 Fighter Aces of World War I. Osprey Publishing. ISBN 978-1-84603-201-1.
