= Frank Weare =

British World War I flying ace

Frank Gerald Craven Weare
- Born: 15 June 1896; Southborough, Kent, England
- Died: 6 July 1971 (aged 75)
- Military career
- Allegiance: United Kingdom
- Branch: British Army; Royal Air Force
- Service years: 1915–1924
- Rank: Flight lieutenant
- Nickname: Weary
- Units: The Buffs (East Kent Regiment); No. 22 Squadron RFC/RAF
- Conflicts: World War I • Western Front
- Awards: Military Cross
- Other work: Company director

Flight Lieutenant Frank Gerald Craven Weare MC (15 June 1896 – 6 July 1971) was a British World War I flying ace credited with fifteen aerial victories in forty days.

== Early life and education ==
Weare was born in Southborough, Kent, the son of Frank and Mary L. Weare. His father ran the High Brooms Brick & Tile Company, which had been founded by his father, John Smith Weare, in 1885. In 1910 Weare was sent to Charterhouse School.

== World War I service ==
Weare attended the Royal Military College, Sandhurst as a "Gentlemen Cadet", and on 20 October 1915 received a commission as a second lieutenant in the York and Lancaster Regiment. However, this was later cancelled, and Weare was commissioned into The Buffs (East Kent Regiment) instead.

In 1917 Weare was seconded to the Royal Flying Corps and, on completion of his basic flight training, was appointed a flying officer on 11 July. On 1 September 1917 he was transferred to the General List with the temporary rank of lieutenant while serving in the RFC. On 24 December 1917 he was promoted to lieutenant, with seniority from 1 July.

He was appointed a flight commander with the temporary rank of captain in No. 22 Squadron RFC on 11 March 1918. Flying a Bristol F.2b two-seater fighter Weare gained his first victory two days later, on 13 March, with Second Lieutenant S. J. Hunter as his observer. He and Hunter gained another victory on 16 March, before Weare was paired with Lieutenant George Hayward. By the end of the month Weare and Hayward had gained six more victories. On 1 April 1918, the Army's Royal Flying Corps (RFC) and the Royal Naval Air Service (RNAS) were merged to form the Royal Air Force and Weare's unit became No. 22 Squadron RAF. The next day Weare and Hayward destroyed two more enemy aircraft, then three on 12 April, and two more on the 22nd, bring Weare's total to 15, and Hayward's to 24.

Weare was awarded the Military Cross, which was gazetted on 21 June 1918. His citation read:

Lieutenant (Temporary Captain) Frank Gerald Craven Weare, East Kent Regiment and R.F.C.

"For conspicuous gallantry and devotion to duty. In the course of eight days' operations he destroyed two enemy machines, drove down one out of control and enabled his observer to destroy two others. During an earlier engagement he carried out two valuable reconnaissances at a low altitude. He showed a splendid fighting spirit and displayed great skill and judgment in leading his formation."

=== List of aerial victories ===
Combat record
No.	Date/Time	Aircraft/ Serial No.	Opponent	Result	Location	Notes
No. 22 Squadron RFC
1	13 March 1918 @ 1615	Bristol F.2b (A7254)	Albatros D.V	Destroyed	Seclin–Houplines	Observer: Second Lieutenant S. J. Hunter
2	16 March 1918 @ 1155	Bristol F.2b (B1152)	Pfalz D.III	Destroyed	South-west of Esquerchin	Observer: Second Lieutenant S. J. Hunter
3	18 March 1918 @ 1015	Bristol F.2b (B1152)	Albatros D.V	Destroyed	Carvin	Observer: Lieutenant George Hayward
4	24 March 1918 @ 1115–1120	Bristol F.2b (C4828)	Albatros D.V	Destroyed	Chérisy	Observer: Lieutenant George Hayward
5	24 March 1918 @ 1115–1120	Bristol F.2b (C4828)	Albatros D.V	Destroyed	Vis-en-Artois	Observer: Lieutenant George Hayward
6	26 March 1918 @ 1245	Bristol F.2b (B1217)	Pfalz D.III	Destroyed	East of Albert	Observer: Lieutenant George Hayward
7	26 March 1918 @ 1245	Bristol F.2b (B1217)	Pfalz D.III	Out of control	East of Albert	Observer: Lieutenant George Hayward
8	29 March 1918 @ 1545	Bristol F.2b (B1164)	Albatros D.V	Out of control	Guillaucourt	Observer: Lieutenant George Hayward
No. 22 Squadron RAF
9	2 April 1918 @ 1645	Bristol F.2b (B1164)	Albatros D.V	Destroyed	Vauvillers	Observer: Lieutenant George Hayward
10	2 April 1918 @ 1645	Bristol F.2b (B1164)	Albatros D.V	Destroyed in flames	Vauvillers	Observer: Lieutenant George Hayward
11	12 April 1918 @ 1455–1500	Bristol F.2b (B1253)	Pfalz D.III	Destroyed	South-west of Sailly	Observer: Lieutenant George Hayward
12	12 April 1918 @ 1455–1500	Bristol F.2b (B1253)	Pfalz D.III	Destroyed	South-west of Sailly	Observer: Lieutenant George Hayward
13	12 April 1918 @ 1455–1500	Bristol F.2b (B1253)	Pfalz D.III	Destroyed	Sailly	Observer: Lieutenant George Hayward
14	22 April 1918 @ 0940	Bristol F.2b (B1253)	Albatros D.V	Out of control	East of Merville	Observer: Lieutenant George Hayward
15	22 April 1918 @ 0940	Bristol F.2b (B1253)	Albatros D.V	Out of control	East of Merville	Observer: Lieutenant George Hayward

== Post-war career ==
On 1 May 1919 Weare was again appointed a temporary captain, and on 1 August was granted a permanent commission in the Royal Air Force as a lieutenant, becoming a flying officer when the RAF adopted its own system of ranks soon after.

In July 1920, during the annual RAF Pageant, Weare took part in a cross-country race between six Avro 504 aircraft, taking an early lead, and eventually winning. On 1 January 1922 he was promoted to flight lieutenant.

On 6 August 1923 Weare was one of the sixteen competitors in the "Air League Challenge Cup", representing RAF Cranwell. The race took place over a triangular course of about 100 miles (160 km), beginning and ending at Waddon Aerodrome, with all competitors flying the Bristol F.2 Fighter. Other entrants included Wing Commander J. T. Babington, representing RAF Andover, Flying Officer G. W. Hemming (RAF Farnborough), Flying Officer L. Hamilton (RAF Kenley), Wing Commander A. S. Barratt (RAF Spitalgate) and Air Commodore H. C. T. Dowding (RAF Northolt). The eventual winner was Flight Lieutenant H. S. Shield, of RAF Eastchurch, with Air Commodore Dowding second, and Flight Lieutenant E. B. Rice (RAF Halton) third.

On 30 January 1924 Weare resigned his RAF commission, but was permitted to retain his rank.

Weare had become engaged to Eleanor Rachel Cherry-Downes in November 1923, and they were married at St Paul's Church, Knightsbridge, on 30 April 1924. They would go on to have four children. Weare became a director of the High Brooms Brick & Tile Company, eventually taking control after the death of his father in 1941. The company was finally wound up in the 1960s.
