= Edwin Swale =

RAF & RN officer (1899-1978)

- Born: 28 June 1899; Chesterfield, Derbyshire, England
- Died: 19 July 1978 (aged 79); Chesterfield, Derbyshire, England
- Burial place: Spital Cemetery, Chesterfield; 53°13′57″N 1°24′59″W
- Military career
- Allegiance: United Kingdom
- Branch: Royal Navy; Royal Air Force
- Service years: 1917–1919; 1939–1954
- Rank: Wing Commander
- Nickname: Eddie
- Units: No. 12 (Naval) Squadron; No. 10 (Naval) Squadron/210 Squadron RAF
- Conflicts: World War I • Western Front; World War II
- Awards: Order of the British Empire; Distinguished Flying Cross & Bar
- Other work: Businessman, Alderman, and Mayor of Chesterfield (1953)

Wing Commander Edwin Swale CBE, DFC*, JP (28 June 1899 – 19 July 1978) was an English First World War flying ace credited with 17 aerial victories. His victory list is notable because he scored 14 of his 17 wins against the premier German fighter of the war, the Fokker D.VII, and became the leading Sopwith Camel ace of No. 210 Squadron RAF.

== Early life and education ==
Swale was born in Chesterfield, Derbyshire, the younger son of Arthur Whiteley Swale and his wife Emmeline (née Furness), of Hady House, Chesterfield, and was educated at the Chesterfield Grammar School.

== World War I service ==
In August 1917, only a few weeks after his 18th birthday, Swale joined the Royal Naval Air Service as a probationary flight officer, after six-months with the Nottinghamshire Officer Training Corps. and having successfully completed his flight training, was appointed a temporary flight sub-lieutenant on 15 February 1918.

He was posted very briefly to No. 12 (Naval) Squadron, before joining No. 10 (Naval) Squadron on 21 March 1918 to fly a Sopwith Camel single-seat fighter. However, on 1 April 1918 the Royal Naval Air Service was merged with the Army's Royal Flying Corps (RFC) to form the Royal Air Force, and Swale's unit became No. 210 Squadron RAF.

Swale's first aerial victory came on 30 May 1918, destroying a Pfalz D.III fighter. On 5 June he destroyed an observation balloon, and on 17 June an Albatros D.V fighter. On 20 July he drove down out of control two Fokker D.VII fighters, and destroyed another on the 22nd. He accounted for three D.VIIs in August, and five in September, being appointed a flight commander with the acting rank of captain on the 5th. As commander of "A" Flight he shot down two more D.VIIs on 1 October, finally rounding off his score with his seventeenth and final victory on 8 October, by sending another down in flames. Swale was posted back to the Home Establishment on 21 October, just prior to the armistice.

On 2 November 1918 his award of the Distinguished Flying Cross was gazetted. His citation read:

Lieutenant Edwin Swale (Sea Patrol).

"A successful and skilful pilot who has destroyed three enemy machines and one kite balloon, and has, in addition, driven down four aeroplanes out of control. On the 15th of September he attacked one of five Fokker biplanes; this machine was driven down out of control, and, on attempting to land, crashed."

Just a month later, on 3 December, his award of a bar to his Distinguished Flying Cross was gazetted. The citation read:

Lieutenant (Acting Captain) Edwin Swale, DFC. (Sea Patrol, Flanders)

"A gallant and determined officer. On 1st October Capt. Swale led his patrol to attack eleven Fokker biplanes; in the engagement that ensued he drove down the leader, which crashed and caused a second machine to fall out of control. In addition to the foregoing, this officer has destroyed nine hostile 'planes and driven down five out of control."

Swale was transferred to the unemployed list on 5 February 1919. On April 11, 1918, while flying Sopwith Camel B3817, he crashed while making a forced-landing in bad weather in a field at Hazebrouck while on a low-level interdiction mission. He was unharmed. Then on September 17, 1918, his aircraft - Camel E4406 - was hit by German anti-aircraft over Ostend. Again, he was uninjured.

=== List of aerial victories ===
Combat record
No.	Date/Time	Aircraft/ Serial No.	Opponent	Result	Location
1	30 May 1918 @ 1130	Sopwith Camel (D3392)	Pfalz D.III	Destroyed	West of Armentières
2	5 June 1918 @ 1000	Sopwith Camel (D3392)	Balloon	Destroyed	Estaires
3	17 June 1918 @ 0800	Sopwith Camel (D9613)	Albatros D.V	Destroyed	South-east of Zillebeke Lake
4	20 July 1918 @ 0945	Sopwith Camel (D9613)	Fokker D.VII	Out of control	South-east of Ostend
5	20 July 1918 @ 0945	Sopwith Camel (D9613)	Fokker D.VII	Out of control	South-east of Ostend
6	22 July 1918 @ 1755	Sopwith Camel (D9613)	Fokker D.VII	Destroyed	South of Ostend
7	1 August 1918 @ 1925	Sopwith Camel (D9675)	Fokker D.VII	Out of control	North of Lille
8	11 August 1918 @ 0930	Sopwith Camel (D9675)	Fokker D.VII	Destroyed	West of Roeselare
9	15 August 1918 @ 1620	Sopwith Camel (D9675)	Fokker D.VII	Destroyed	South-east of Bruges
10	1 September 1918 @ 1830	Sopwith Camel (E4406)	Fokker D.VII	Out of control	East of Ypres
11	3 September 1918 @ 1830	Sopwith Camel (E4406)	Fokker D.VII	Destroyed	Kortrijk
12	6 September 1918 @ 1835	Sopwith Camel (E4406)	Fokker D.VII	Destroyed	West of Ostend
13	24 September 1918 @ 1440	Sopwith Camel (D3332)	Fokker D.VII	Destroyed	South of Sint-Pieters-Kapelle
14	29 September 1918 @ 0800	Sopwith Camel (F3116)	Fokker D.VII	Destroyed	Kortemark
15	1 October 1918 @ 1710–1715	Sopwith Camel (D3332)	Fokker D.VII	Destroyed	South-east of Roeselare
16	1 October 1918 @ 1710–1715	Sopwith Camel (D3332)	Fokker D.VII	Out of control	Roeselare
17	8 October 1918 @ 0920	Sopwith Camel (D3332)	Fokker D.VII	Destroyed in flames	4 miles (6.4 km) North-east of Roeselare

== Between the wars ==
After the war Swale returned to Chesterfield, joining the family clothing business. He served as an alderman on the Borough Council between 1927 and 1933, and was an instructor in the Derbyshire and Lancashire Gliding Club, and for a while held the club's altitude record of 7,000 feet (2,100 m). He also competed in the 1938 National Gliding Contests, flying a Grunau Baby.

== World War II service ==
During World War II, Swale returned to service in the Administrative and Special Duties Branch of the Royal Air Force Volunteer Reserve, being granted a commission "for the duration of hostilities" as a pilot officer on probation on 26 September 1939. He was promoted to flying officer on 14 February 1940, made an acting squadron leader on 1 January 1944, and was promoted to that rank on 15 July 1944. He served with the "Ultra" cryptanalysts who cracked the strategically important German Enigma machine code. He also served with the RAF Second Tactical Air Force. Swale received mentions in despatches on 14 June 1945 and 1 January 1946, by which time he was an acting wing commander.

== Post-war career ==
Swale returned to his business in Chesterfield. He served as President of the Old Cestrefeldian Society (alumni of Chesterfield Grammar School) in 1946, and served on the Borough Council between 1946 and 1977, being the Mayor of Chesterfield in 1953. (His father had held the same position in 1932).

He retained his interest in flying, competing as part of team flying an EoN Olympia in the National Gliding Contest in August 1949, and coming 10th. He also remained on the Emergency List of the Royal Air Force Volunteer Reserve, with the rank of squadron leader, until eventually relinquishing his commission on 24 August 1954, and retaining the rank of wing commander.

Swale was made an Officer of the Order of the British Empire (OBE) in the 1958 Birthday Honours, and a Commander of the Order of the British Empire (CBE) on the 1964 list. He was made an Honorary Freeman of the Borough of Chesterfield on 1 March 1966. j

The Secondary School at Old Whittington in Chesterfield was named after him before being renamed in the 1990s as Meadows Community School. Its school tie was a black background with a diagonal red and gold stripe. Its recent Ofsted rating was Good.

Edwin Swale died in 1978, and is buried alongside his wife and parents in the Spital Cemetery, Chesterfield.

== Personal life ==
His older brother Arthur Duncan Swale was killed in action on 5 October 1918 while serving in the 6th Battalion (attached 11th Battalion), Sherwood Foresters (Nottinghamshire and Derbyshire Regiment), and is buried in the Communal Cemetery Extension in Doingt, Somme, France.

Swale married Dorothy Asquith in 1921. Their son Duncan Swale also served in the Royal Air Force Volunteer Reserve during the Second World War, being commissioned from leading aircraftsman to pilot officer on 3 July 1942. He served in No. 107 Squadron, and was awarded the British Distinguished Flying Cross in December 1944 and the American Distinguished Flying Cross in June 1945, ending the war with the rank of flight lieutenant. Like his father he remained on the RAFVR post-war, serving until at least November 1954.

Their daughter Margaret Swale, also developed in interest in flying, being a member of the Derbyshire and Lancashire Gliding Club alongside her father. She was part of his team in the 1949 National Gliding Contest, and that year also took a leading part in the short film Wings For Pauline, shot at Great Hucklow.
