= Charles Rieseck Krauthoff =

American Brigadier General

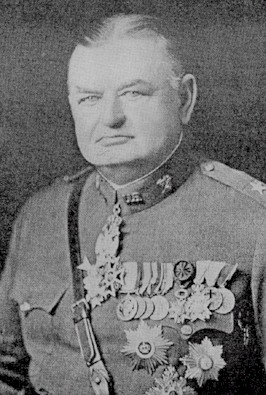
- US Army Quartermaster Hall of Fame, Ft. Lee, VA
- Born: October 6, 1863; St. Louis, Missouri, US
- Died: February 24, 1936 (aged 72); Washington, D.C., US
- Burial place: Arlington National Cemetery
- Spouse: Blanche Rowlinson Dienst (m. 1896-1921, her death)
- Military career
- Allegiance: United States
- Branch: United States Army
- Service years: 1884-1922
- Rank: Brigadier General
- Service number: 0-67
- Unit: U.S. Army Quartermaster Corps

Charles Rieseck Krauthoff (October 6, 1863 – February 24, 1936) was the depot commissary officer at the Presidio during the 1906 San Francisco earthquake and later an American brigadier general during World War I.

== Early life ==
Krauthoff was born on October 6, 1863, in St. Louis, Missouri, the son of Louis N. Krauthoff and Sophie (Rieseck) Krauthoff. After the death of his father, Krauthoff was raised and educated in Jefferson City and Kansas City. Intent on a military career, after completing his schooling, he joined the United States Army.

== Military career ==
Krauthoff enlisted as a private with Battery F of the Second Field Artillery on August 3, 1884. He was promoted to corporal, sergeant, and first sergeant. As a noncommissioned officer, he was eligible for the competitive examination for a commission, which he took in 1891.

He was commissioned as a second lieutenant in the 14th Infantry on April 26, 1891. He graduated from the Infantry and Cavalry School in 1898. He was promoted to first lieutenant on April 26, 1898.

On April 18, 1906, San Francisco shook violently from a 7.9 earthquake. Krauthoff was serving as the depot commissary officer at the Presidio at the time of the disaster. Under his supervision, food and supplies were distributed to over 30,000 refugees during the relief effort.

Krauthoff was promoted to brigadier general on October 1, 1918.

On July 15, 1919, he became assistant Quartermaster General.

He retired on December 7, 1922.

== Awards ==
His awards include the Army Distinguished Service Medal, the Medal for Bravery (Montenegro), Commander of the Order of the Crown (Belgium), Officer of the Legion of Honour (France), officer of the Order of the Crown (Romania), Officer of the Order of the White Eagle (Serbia), Officer of the Order of St. Sava (Yugoslavia), and Commander of the Order of Polonia Restituta (Poland).

Krauthoff was inducted in to the Quartermaster Hall of Fame in 2005.

== Personal ==
=== Family ===
In 1896, Krauthoff married Blanche Dienst in Topeka, Kansas. They had no children, and she died in 1921.

=== Death and burial ===
Krauthoff died in Washington, D.C., on February 24, 1936. He was buried at Arlington National Cemetery.
