= Janet and Anne Grahame Johnstone =

British twin sisters and illustrator duo

Janet and Anne Grahame Johnstone at work together.

Janet Johnstone (1 June 1928 – 20 January 1979) and Anne Grahame Johnstone (1 June 1928 – 25 May 1998) were English twin sisters and children's book illustrators best known for their delicate, detailed prolific artwork and for illustrating Dodie Smith's classic book The Hundred and One Dalmatians.

== Early life ==
The twins were born in Marylebone, London to Royal Navy acting-Captain Edward Grahame Johnstone and portraitist and costume designer Doris Zinkeisen. They attended Heathfield School in Ascot, Berkshire during World War II, their artistic bent nurtured both at home and at school. Later, they attended Saint Martin's School of Art in London, where they studied period clothing styles before moving to Woodbridge, Suffolk in 1966. The twins never married and lived with their mother until Janet's death in 1979 and Doris's death in 1991.

== Becoming popular children's illustrators ==
The Johnstone sisters' popularity took off in the early 1950s, when they were noticed by publishers and acquired a growing reputation as talented illustrators. They always worked together, passing drawings back and forth across their studio until both twins were satisfied with the final outcome. Janet specialized in animals and birds. Anne focused on the period costumes that so dominated their work. Because of their symbiotic collaboration, until the death of Janet in 1979, there was never a book illustrated under either one of their names alone.

The first important book the twins worked on was The Hundred and One Dalmatians by Dodie Smith, who was already a very successful playwright and author. In 1956 she invited them to illustrate her first children's book, and it was an immediate success, captivating parents and children alike.

The twins' further success with later Smith books, The Starlight Barking and The Midnight Kittens, made them the most widely recognized illustrators of children's books in England at the time. Their business association developed into an enduring friendship until Smith died in November 1990.

=== Work in early television ===
Although not widely remembered, the twins at an early stage of their career worked extensively in British television, during the formative years of children's programming. They produced a considerable amount of artwork for programmes including "Tai Lu", "Andy Pandy," and "The Flower Pot Men." These programmes were very popular with British children during the 1950s and 1960s.

=== Their prolific career ===
Over the course of their career together, the sisters illustrated more than 100 books. These included classic fairytales by Hans Christian Andersen, the Brothers Grimm, J. M. Barrie, Charles Kingsley, a series based on Biblical tales, Roger Lancelyn Green's Tales of the Greeks and Trojans (Purnell and Sons, London, 1963), as well as a large variety of rhyme and modern story-collections. Early commissions included Enid Blyton's Tales of Ancient Greece (1951), and new illustrations for a shocking old German children's morality book, Struwwelpeter (1950). The Johnstones illustrated many of Paul Gallico's magical children's stories, working on Manxmouse, The Man who was Magic, and Miracle in the Wilderness. Their most collectible book to date is Enid Blyton's 1979 Dean & Son book, the ‘De Luxe edition’ of The Enchanted Wood.

Most of their work was done designing Christmas cards and illustrating numbers of large, brightly coloured gift books, mainly published by Dean. Their full-page illustrations surrounding nursery rhymes, fairy tales or children's prayers were in the tradition of undemanding effusiveness set by older artists like Hilda Boswell, still hugely popular with the public though increasingly frowned on by critics.

Janet and Anne also illustrated many company logos and advertisements, including a wine label designed by the twins for their own brand of wine (Chateau Badingham). Their work was also featured in the British children's magazines Robin and Finding Out.

== Janet’s death ==
In 1979, Janet died as a result of smoke inhalation following a fire in the kitchen, leaving Anne devastated and alone for the first time in her life. Their brother Murray described them together as one and a half rather than two people. Anne found herself unexpectedly responsible for the entire business enterprise previously shared with her sister, and managed to honour all of their outstanding commissions. She had to master the techniques for drawing and painting animals, particularly horses, which had been the specialty of her sister. Eventually she became so adept that she was elected a Member of the Society of Equestrian Artists in 1998.

=== Later work ===
On her own in the 1980s, Anne produced many fine illustrations. Two particularly notable books she illustrated were the editions of Peter Pan and The Water Babies, published by Award Publications. Each year she also produced Christmas cards for Royles, which were very popular. Other projects included designs for limited edition Christmas jigsaw puzzles for the British game manufacturer Waddingtons, and two books she wrote and illustrated about Santa Claus. Over the years, she became an expert in 19th-century military uniforms and often worked as an heraldic artist through the College of Arms. Anne died of liver cancer in Badingham, Suffolk on 25 May 1998 at the age of 69. She continued to work until two days before her death.
