= Alfred Mills =

Alfred Mills may refer to:

- Alfred Mills (footballer) (1874–1929), English footballer
- Alfred Mills (flying ace) (1899–), Irish World War I flying ace

== See also ==
- Alfred Miles (disambiguation)
