= Solomon Clifford Joseph =

British flying ace

- Born: 29 April 1893; Birmingham, England
- Died: 21 March 1966 (aged 72); Birmingham, England
- Military career
- Allegiance: United Kingdom
- Branch: British Army; Royal Air Force
- Service years: 1917–1919
- Rank: Captain
- Units: No. 12 Squadron RNAS; No. 10 Squadron RNAS/No. 210 Squadron RAF
- Awards: Distinguished Flying Cross & Bar
- Other work: Businessman

Captain Solomon Clifford Joseph DFC* (29 April 1893 – 21 March 1966) was a British flying ace of the Royal Naval Air Service during World War I. He was credited with thirteen confirmed aerial victories.

Postwar, Joseph moved into engineering and manufacturing. He acquired components of New Imperial Motors upon its dissolution in 1939, and produced aircraft parts for the British war effort of World War II. After World War II, he turned his company's manufacturing to agricultural machinery.

== Early life ==
Solomon Clifford Joseph was born in Birmingham on 29 April 1893.

== World War I ==
Joseph joined the RNAS in August 1917. He trained as a pilot, receiving Royal Aero Club Aviator's Certificate No. 5475 on a Caudron biplane at the British Flying School at Vendôme, France, on 7 October, and was commissioned as a temporary flight sub-lieutenant on 2 December.

He was first assigned to No. 12 Squadron RNAS, but was transferred to No. 10 Squadron RNAS in February 1918 as a Sopwith Camel pilot. He scored his first aerial victory on 7 May 1918, and continued to string out a dozen wins stretching through 3 September 1918; he teamed up to share victories with such fellow aces as Alfred Williams Carter and Clement W. Payton in several cases. On 10 August he was appointed a flight commander, with its accompanying temporary promotion to captain. On 21 September, he was awarded the Distinguished Flying Cross. Three days later, he was wounded in action. He recovered in time to round off his victory string with a final win on 30 October 1918. Three days later, he was granted a Bar to his DFC in lieu of a second award. In the final analysis, Joseph had destroyed five enemy aircraft by himself, shared in destroying two others, drove three down out of control, and teamed up to drive another one down out of combat. He also was a balloon buster, being one of three pilots responsible for destroying a German observation balloon.

On 4 April 1919, Joseph was transferred to the Royal Air Force's unemployed list.

== Postwar career ==
Joseph returned to Birmingham to pursue a career in the engineering sector. On 17 November 1925 the partnership between Joseph and two others in the Tyseley Munitions Works, operating as breakers down of service ammunition and fuses, was dissolved. In early 1939 Simpson bought the assets of the bankrupt New Imperial Motors motorcycle company, which become part of his Clifford Aero & Auto Ltd. group, and produced components for Lancaster and Spitfire aircraft during the war. Post war, under the name of Clifford Cultivators Ltd., he produced rotary cultivators from 1946 to 1959, as well as hand and power pumps, electric washing machines, and fork lift trucks, while his company Clifford Covering Ltd. manufactured steering wheels.

Clifford Aero & Auto was wound up in 1976.

== Honours and awards ==
Distinguished Flying Cross
Lieutenant Solomon Clifford Joseph (Sea Patrol).

"A gallant pilot who has accounted for eight enemy aircraft within the past four months. On many occasions the enemy were numerically superior to Lieutenant Joseph's patrol, but this did not prevent his attaining success."

Bar to the Distinguished Flying Cross
Lieutenant (Temporary Captain) Solomon Clifford Joseph, DFC, Sea Patrol.

"A very gallant and skilful officer. Helped his formation under a large force of enemy aircraft with a view to inducing them to descend to attack him. In this ruse de guerre he was successful, and, in accordance with arrangements previously made, another formation of our machines then appeared on the scene, and a combined attack was made on the enemy, resulting in the destruction of four aeroplanes and three more being brought down completely out of control. Since the award of the Distinguished Flying Cross was conferred on this officer less than two months ago he has personally destroyed one enemy machine, brought down another out of control, and has helped to destroy a third. Captain Joseph was wounded on the occasion of the combined attack.
