= Vinko Šamarlić =

Bosnian army officer

- Born: 8 March 1964; Ozimica, Žepče, SFRY
- Died: 8 June 1992 (aged 28); Sarajevo, Republic of Bosnia and Herzegovina
- Children: 1
- Military career
- Allegiance: Republic of Bosnia and Herzegovina
- Branch: Army of the Republic of Bosnia and Herzegovina
- Rank: Captain
- Unit: Special Unit of MUP RBiH
- Conflicts: Bosnian War; Siege of Sarajevo †
- Awards: Golden Police Star; Medal for Bravery; Order of the Golden Crest with Swords

Vinko Šamarlić (March 8, 1964 – June 8, 1992) was a Bosnian police special unit member and an officer in the Army of the Republic of Bosnia and Herzegovina. He was also successful judoka. He was posthumously awarded the Golden Police Star, the Medal for Bravery, and the Order of the Golden Crest with Swords, after he died in the Battle of Hrasno, during the siege of Sarajevo in the Bosnian War.

== Biography ==
Vinko Šamarlić was born on March 8, 1964, in Ozimica near Žepče. After finishing elementary school in Zavidovići, he went to Sarajevo, where he attended the Police High School. After finishing school, he was first employed as a policeman, and in 1985 he joined the Special Unit, where he became the commander of a combat unit with the rank of captain. In parallel with this, he was a prominent judoka of the Sarajevo Judo Club Željezničar. He won numerous medals and became a member of the Bosnian national team.

At the onset of the Bosnian War, he had met the Olympic qualification standard to compete in the 1992 Olympic Games in Barcelona. As a member of the special unit of the Ministry of the Internal Affairs of the Republic of Bosnia and Herzegovina, he died in the battle of Hrasno on June 8, 1992, the day before the departure of the team to the Olympic Games in Barcelona, where he was supposed to carry the flag of Bosnia and Herzegovina.

== Orders and medals ==
He was posthumously awarded the "Golden Police Star", the "Medal for Bravery" and the "Order of the Golden Crest with Swords". In his memory, a street in Ilidža near Sarajevo bears his name, and every year in his memory the international Vinko Šamarlić Memorial Judo Tournament is held in Sarajevo.
