= Doris Zinkeisen =

Scottish designer and painter (1897–1991)

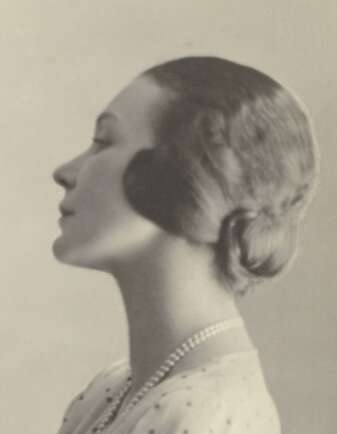
- Doris Zinkeisen in 1929
- Born: Doris Clare Zinkeisen; 31 July 1897; Rosneath, Gare Loch, Scotland
- Died: 3 January 1991 (aged 93); Badingham, Suffolk, England
- Known for: Stage design, Costume design, Painting, Commercial art
- Spouse: Edward Grahame Johnstone (m. 1927; died 1946)
- Children: 3

Doris Clare Zinkeisen (31 July 1897 – 3 January 1991) was a Scottish theatrical stage and costume designer, painter, commercial artist, and writer. She was best known for her work in theatrical design.

== Early life ==
Doris Zinkeisen was born in Clynder House in Rosneath, Argyll, Scotland. Her parents were Welsh-born Clare Bolton-Charles and Victor Zinkeisen, a shipper, manufacturer and yarn merchant and amateur artist from Glasgow. Her father was Scottish-born, but both of his parents had emigrated from Altenburg in Thuringia in around 1859 and had settled in Scotland. She had a younger sister, Anna Zinkeisen, who also became an artist. The family left Scotland and moved to Pinner, near Harrow in 1909. Zinkeisen attended the Harrow School of Art for four years and won a scholarship to the Royal Academy Schools in 1917 together with her sister Anna. During World War I Zinkeisen served in a Voluntary Aid Detachment at a hospital in Northwood, Middlesex.

== Career ==
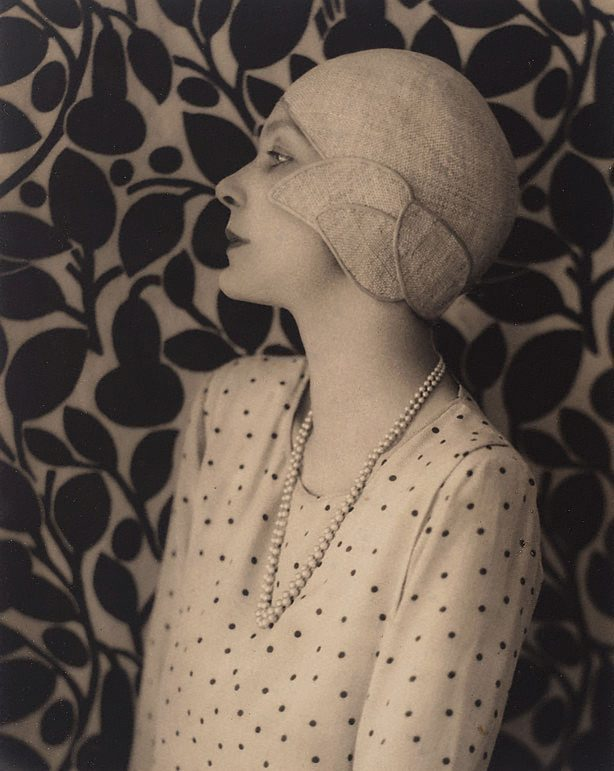
Doris Zinkeisen: New Idea portrait with leaf background (1929) by Harold Cazneaux

Zinkeisen shared a studio in London with her sister during the 1920s and 1930s from where she embarked on her career as a painter, commercial artist, and theatrical designer.

=== Painting and commercial art ===
Zinkeisen's realist style made her popular as a portraitist and she became a well-known society painter The subject matter of her paintings, society portraiture, equestrian portraiture, and scenes from the parks of London and Paris reflect the lifestyle of the upper class at the time. An early success was her 1925 portrait of the actor Elsa Lanchester.

She also worked widely in other media as an illustrator and commercial artist including producing advertising posters for several British mainline railway companies and murals for the RMS Queen Mary. A 1939 poster for the London Underground, At the Theatre, was printed but never issued due to the start of World War II.

In 1944, Doris and her sister Anna were commissioned by United Steel Companies (USC) to produce twelve paintings that were reproduced in the trade and technical press in Britain, Canada, Australia and South Africa. The images were subsequently collated in a book, This Present Age, published in 1946.

==== Railway posters ====
Zinkeisen produced a number of posters for London and North Eastern Railway (LNER), Southern Railway (SR), and the London, Midland and Scottish Railway (LMS) in the 1930s. The posters often featured historical themes and included:

- Berwick-upon-Tweed by LNER (1930) which shows Isabella MacDuff, Countess of Buchan being punished by Edward I for crowning Robert the Bruce at Scone in 1306,
- Cambridge it's Quicker by Rail (1930) for LNER that shows Queen Elizabeth I visiting Queens College in 1564,
- Durham by LNER (1932) based on the legend of the dun cow shows pilgrims following a milkmaid with Durham Cathedral in the background,
- To York – Dick Turpin's Ride (1934) for LNER showing the eighteenth-century highwayman, Dick Turpin riding to York on his horse Black Bess with York Minster in the background,
- Western Highlands – Rob Roy (1934) for LNER/LMS showing Rob Roy standing on a mountain,
- Scarborough, In Grandmother's Day (1935) for LNER showing people in Scarborough on the spa bandstand in Victorian dress, with the castle and sea in the background,
- Coronation (1937) for LNER showing the Coronation, the locomotive built by Timothy Hackworth in 1831 in honour of the coronation of King William IV,
- What to see from the windows of the Atlantic Coast Express (1937), a guidebook produced for SR with illustrations,
- The Coronation (1937) with the text "designed by Sir Nigel Gresley, Chief Mechanical Engineer, LNER, in honour of the coronation of King George VI. Kings Cross – Edinburgh in 6 hours" showing the Coronation passing through the countryside,
- Captain Cook at Whitby (c. 1937) for LNER showing Captain Cook and two Royal Navy officers in Whitby harbour with St Mary's Church and Whitby Abbey in the background. The poster's text says "His voyages round the world for making new discoveries were undertaken in the Endeavour in 1768 and the Resolution in 1772. Both these ships were built at Whitby. It's quicker by rail. London and North Eastern Railway."
- Scotland by East Coast Route – LNER with the text "The articles of union between england & scotland were secretly signed in a cellar in high Street edinburgh 1706".

==== RMS Queen Mary ====
In 1935, John Brown and Company Shipbuilders of Clydebank commissioned both of the Zinkeisen sisters to paint the murals in the Verandah Grill, a restaurant and night-club on the ocean liner the RMS Queen Mary. The murals, on the theme of entertainment, depicted circus and theatre scenes and can still be seen on the ship, now permanently moored in Long Beach, California. Zinkeisen was also involved in planning the interior decoration which featured a parquet dance floor surrounded by black Wilton carpets, star-studded red velvet curtains and a sweeping illuminated balustrade whose colours changed in time with the music. Writing in Vogue in 1936, Cecil Beaton described the Verandah Grill as 'By far the prettiest room on any ship – becomingly lit, gay in colour and obviously so successful that it would be crowded if twice its present size'. The largest mural was damaged during World War II by gunnery officers tacking charts to the poster board covering the mural. After the war, Zinkeisen restored the mural and reportedly painted a mouse in the mural so there would always be a mouse on the Queen Mary, a dig at Cunard, which prided itself on having no rodents on their ships. Both sisters also contributed murals to the RMS Queen Elizabeth in 1940.

==== Exhibitions and awards ====
Zinkeisen exhibited at the Royal Academy in 1929, at the Royal Society of Portrait Painters in London and in Paris and the United States. She received Bronze (1929), Silver (1930) and Gold (1934) Paris Salon medals for her work. By 1929 she had been elected a member of the Royal Institute of Oil Painters (ROI).

=== Stage and costume design ===
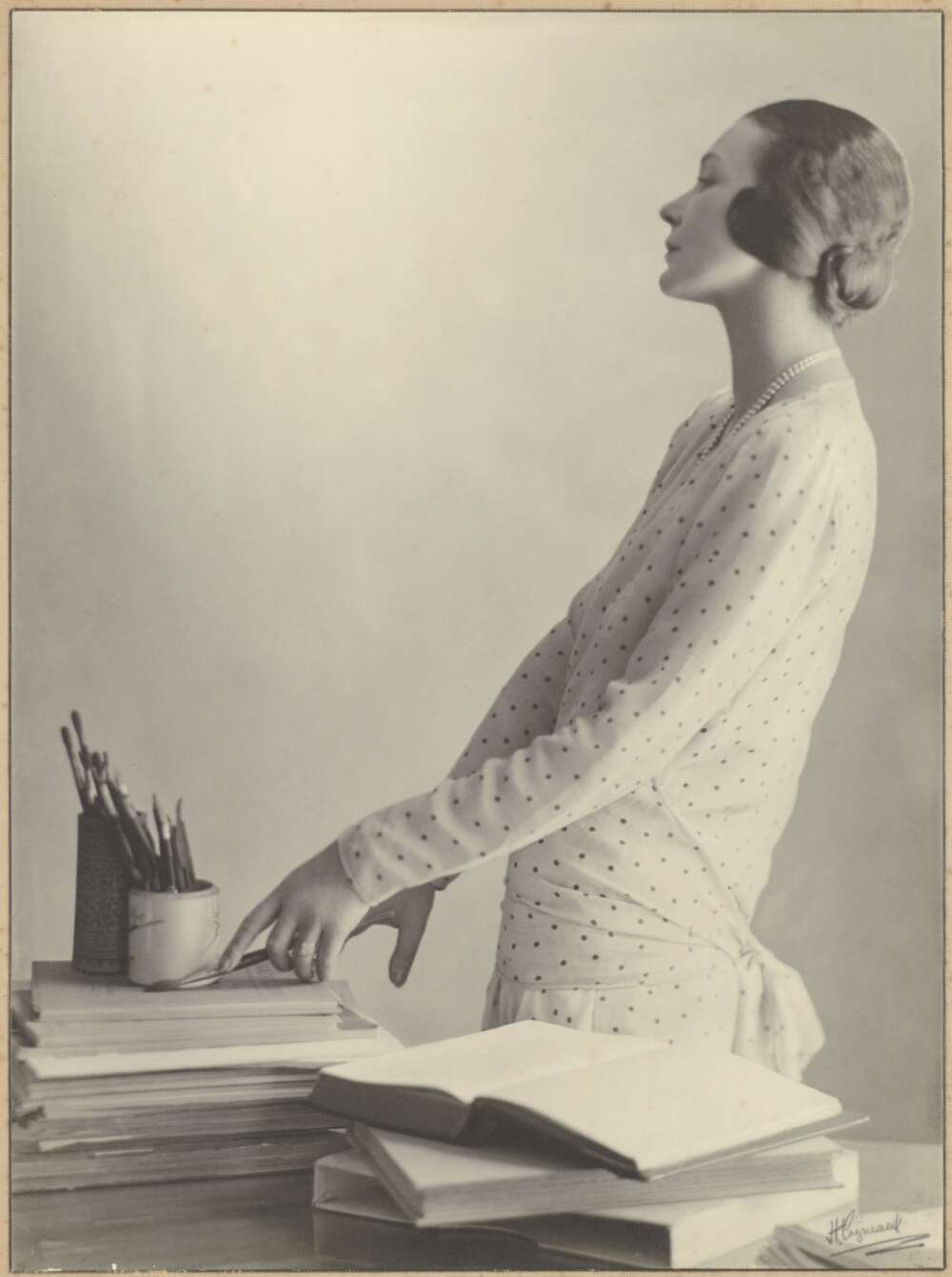
Doris Zinkeisen with her brushes (1929) by Harold Cazneaux

Zinkeisen was a successful stage and costume designer for plays and films. Despite her success as a painter and commercial artist she was best known as a theatrical designer.

She started to work in stage design as soon as she completed her studies at the Royal Academy. Her first job was working for the actor-manager Nigel Playfair. Playfair wanted Zinkeisen to sing in the productions, but Zinkeisen insisted on remaining behind the scenes. One of the first plays she worked on was Clifford Bax and Playfair's 1923 adaptation of The Insect Play by Karel and Josef Čapek. The play ran for 42 performances in May and June 1923 at the Regent Theatre in London. Claude Rains played three roles and the production was the professional debut for John Gielgud. Rains described Zinkeisen as "a stunning women".

Zinkeisen became the chief stage and costume designer for Charles B. Cochran's popular London revues. At some point she either inherited from Cochran or was gifted by him two paintings by Édouard Vuillard, namely the side panels of The Grand Teddy tea-rooms paintings. This provenance was documented in season 3, episode 1 of Fake or Fortune?. Cochran described Zinkeisen's work in an article published in The Studio magazine in 1927.

Miss Doris Zinkeisen seems to me to follow the best traditions of English theatrical decoration... She can now create costumes for all moods and times, and capture with equal facility the acid fervour of puritanism or the sweet lyricism of a faun... this young decorator, at her early age is, in my opinion, in the front rank of British designers.

— Charles B. Cochran, The Studio (1927)

In 1928, Zinkeisen designed the costumes for This Year of Grace by Noël Coward (also referred to as "Cochran's Revue" or "Cochran's 1928 Revue") at the London Pavilion. In 1933, Zinkeison designed the decor and costumes for Cochran's production of Cole Porter's musical Nymph Errant at the Adelphi Theatre in London. The décolletage formed by the low cut design of one of the costumes resulted in a strike by the chorus against the perceived indecency of the costume. Theatre manager C. B. Cochran was compelled to have the waistcoat altered to fill up the gap with gauze. In 1934, she designed the costumes for the Broadway musical The Great Waltz at the Center Theatre, together with Marion Claire, Marie Burke and Guy Robertson. In 1935, she designed the costumes and sets for Stop Press, the retitled London based version of the As Thousands Cheer revue by Moss Hart and Irving Berlin at the Adelphi Theatre. After the Blitz, during the Second World War, she designed costumes and sets for the Old Vic Company productions of Arms and the Man and Richard III with Margaret Leighton, Ralph Richardson, Sybil Thorndike, Joyce Redman and Laurence Olivier at the New Theatre.

Zinkeisen was a costume designer on a number of Herbert Wilcox films that starred Anna Neagle, including the film version of Noël Coward's operetta Bitter Sweet (1933), The Little Damozel, which included a nearly transparent dress that was subsequently used by Neagle in several publicity photographs and public appearances, Nell Gwyn (1934), The Queen's Affair (1934), Peg of Old Drury (1935), and the screen biography of Queen Victoria, Victoria the Great, together with its sequel, Sixty Glorious Years. Wilcox's 1932 film The Blue Danube was based on a short story by Zinkeisen. British-born director James Whale specifically requested Zinkeisen to design the costumes for the only American film she ever worked on, the 1936 screen version of the musical Show Boat. It remains today the most popular and highly regarded film that Zinkeisen worked on. In 1938 she wrote Designing for the Stage, a book regarded by Sue Harper, Professor of Film History, as an "influential innovation". According to Harper, Zinkeisen described how she "valued visual flair and 'fantastic treatment' above all", that she thought theatrical and film performances should be led by the mise en scène and that audiences were unconsciously able to "decode complex visual details". In 1955, Zinkeisen created Laurence Olivier's make-up for the film version of Richard III.

=== World War II, nurse and war artist ===
Human Laundry, Belsen April 1945, oil, Imperial War Museum

During World War II, Zinkeisen joined the St John Ambulance Brigade and worked as a nurse in London helping wartime Blitz casualties having first trained as a Voluntary Aid Detachment (VAD) nurse during World War I. She worked in the casualty department in St Mary's Hospital, Paddington. Zinkeisen worked in the casualty department in the mornings and painted in the afternoons, recording the events of the day. Following the liberation of Europe in 1945, Zinkeisen was commissioned by the War Artists' Advisory Committee as a war artist for the North West Europe Commission of the Joint War Organisation of the British Red Cross Society and the Order of St John (JWO). As the organisation's staff and resources moved into newly liberated areas, Zinkeisen's role as a war artist was to record the commission's activities. Based in Brussels at the commission's headquarters she recorded the commission's post-war relief work in north west Europe including the rehabilitation and repatriation of prisoners of war and civilian internees. Zinkeisen traveled by lorry or by air (from a nearby RAF base) throughout north-west Europe making sketches which she brought back to her studio in the commission's headquarters for further work.

Her work as a war artist included three days at the Bergen-Belsen concentration camp in April 1945, immediately after its liberation. Zinkeisen was one of a small number of artists who produced pictures of Bergen-Belsen in the months following its liberation. The other artists there included Leslie Cole, Mary Kessell, Sergeant Eric Taylor (one of the camp's liberators), Edgar Ainsworth, and Mervyn Peake. Her painting Human Laundry shows German orderlies washing camp inmates before they go to hospital. Thomas Sutcliffe, columnist for The Independent described the painting as "flatly representational", "as uninflected as a travel poster", showing "brutalisers obliged to become carers, victims turned to patients". By the time Zinkeisen had become a war artist her palette had already darkened from the colours of her society paintings. Her war paintings use muted greys, browns, and ochres like contemporaries such as Eric Ravilious and Stanley Spencer.

Zinkeisen wrote to her husband while she was at Belsen. Her son, Murray Johnstone, described the letters:

They are truly heartrending and reflect the agony she endured while doing her work as a war artist. She always told us that the sight was awful, but the smell she could never forget. She had nightmares for the rest of her life.

— Murray Johnstone

Paintings from Zinkeisen's time as a war artist are held by the Red Cross museum and archives, the museum of the Order of St John and the Imperial War Museum.

=== After the war ===
Her work was part of the painting event in the art competition at the 1948 Summer Olympics. After the war, Zinkeisen continued to work in London as a theatrical designer and held occasional exhibitions of her paintings. She designed the cover of a special edition of Everybody's Magazine to celebrate the coronation of Queen Elizabeth II in June 1953. In 1954, Zinkeisen designed the scenery and costumes for Noël Coward's musical, After the Ball, based on Oscar Wilde's play, Lady Windermere's Fan, and the Prince Littler directed play, The Little Glass Clock, written by Hugh Mills.

== Portraits by Harold Cazneaux ==
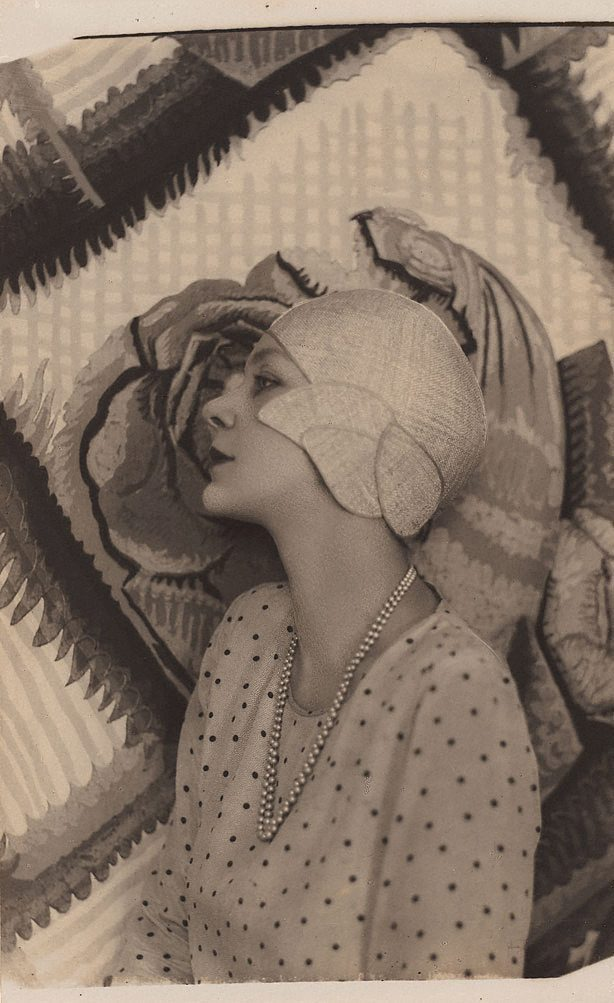
Doris Zinkeisen: New Idea portrait with patterned background (1929) by Harold Cazneaux

Harold Cazneaux produced three photographic portraits of Zinkeisen in 1929 in his role as chief photographer for The Home magazine; Doris Zinkeisen: New Idea portrait with patterned background, Doris Zinkeisen: New Idea portrait with leaf background, and Doris Zinkeisen with her brushes.

Doris Zinkeisen: New Idea portrait with leaf background was the first photographic cover for The Home that was launched in Sydney in 1920 and modelled on the American magazines Vanity Fair and House & Garden. Zinkeisen was said to have epitomised the "New Feminine Beauty" described by The Home in 1929 as "stark simplicity of line, of corners, angles, slimness, sharpness ... twenty years ago we were born curvy and now we are born straight." The leaf background was painted by the Australian artist Adrian Feint. Prints of these photographs are held by the National Library of Australia, National Gallery of Australia, and the Art Gallery of New South Wales.

== Personal life ==
In 1922, while working with Nigel Playfair, Zinkeisen met James Whale. The two were considered a couple for some two years, although later Whale lived in the United States as an openly gay man. The couple was reportedly engaged in 1924 but by 1925 the engagement was off. Zinkeisen married naval officer Edward Grahame Johnstone in 1927 and had twin daughters in June 1928, the children's book illustrators Janet and Anne Grahame Johnstone and a son, Murray Johnstone. Zinkeisen was a fine horsewoman and won the Moscow Cup at the International Horse Show in 1934.

Grahame Johnstone died in 1946 and Zinkeisen's twin girls then lived with her, with them all moving to Suffolk in 1966. Zinkeisen outlived her daughter Janet who died in an accident in 1979. Doris Zinkeisen died on 3 January 1991, in Badingham in Suffolk, aged 93.

== Books ==
- Zinkeisen, Doris (1938). Designing for the Stage. The Studio.
- Priestley, J. B.; Doris Zinkeisen (1948). The high toby: a play for the toy theatre (with scenery and characters by Doris Zinkeisen). Penguin Books.
