= Clement W. Payton =

British World War I flying ace

Clement Wattson Payton
- Born: 13 April 1897; Walsall, Staffordshire, England
- Died: 2 October 1918 (aged 21) † near Courtrai, Belgium
- Burial place: Harelbeke New British Cemetery, Belgium; 50°51′34″N 3°19′28″E
- Military career
- Allegiance: United Kingdom
- Branch: British Army; Royal Air Force
- Service years: 1917–1918
- Rank: Lieutenant
- Unit: No. 210 Squadron RAF
- Conflicts: World War I • Western Front
- Awards: Distinguished Flying Cross; Croix de guerre (Belgium)

Lieutenant Clement Wattson Payton DFC (13 April 1897 – 2 October 1918) was an English World War I flying ace credited with 11 official victories.

== Early life ==
Payton was born in Walsall, Staffordshire, the second of ten children of The Reverend Joseph Wattson Payton (b. 1861), vicar of Calton, Staffordshire, and his wife Elizabeth Croyden (née Tildesley) (1869–1943). His older brother, Corporal Frederick Thomas Croydon Payton, 5th Battalion, Special Brigade, Royal Engineers, was killed in action on 1 July 1916, and is buried in the Carnoy Military Cemetery, Somme, France.

== World War I ==
Payton joined the Royal Flying Corps as a cadet, and was commissioned as a temporary second lieutenant (on probation) on 17 November 1917. On 4 February 1918 he was granted Royal Aero Club Aviator's Certificate No. 5703 and also confirmed in his rank.

Payton was posted to No. 210 Squadron RAF as a Sopwith Camel fighter pilot in France in April 1918. His first success came on 20 May, when he drove down a German Albatros D.V fighter out of control over Menen, Belgium. The next day, with squadron mates Solomon Clifford Joseph and Albert Leslie Jones, he destroyed a German observation balloon at Pont Riquen. On 26 May, another Albatros D.V fell under his guns. The following day, he and Lawrence Coombes, drove down a Pfalz D.III fighter over Bailleul.

On 1 June 1918 he and Coombes shared in the destruction of a German two-seater reconnaissance aircraft, and Payton joined Coombes as an ace. On 15 June, Payton drove down an Albatros D.V out of action. Payton did not score again until 11 August 1918, when he began a string of five victories over Germany's new fighter, the Fokker D.VII, including a shared win with Ivan Couper Sanderson. The last of these wins, on 1 October 1918, left Payton with a tally of one balloon and two enemy aircraft destroyed (shared), and five enemy aircraft destroyed, and three driven down out of control solo.

Clement Wattson Payton was killed in action on 2 October 1918 after winning the Distinguished Flying Cross. He was shot down by ground fire while bombing an enemy supply train in the vicinity of Courtrai. He is buried in Plot II. B. 6, Harelbeke New British Cemetery, Belgium.

== Awards and citations ==
His Distinguished Flying Cross was gazetted two months after his death, on 3 December 1918. His citation read:

Lieutenant Clement Wattson Payton.

"A gallant and skilful pilot who has himself destroyed two enemy machines and driven down two out of control. Assisted by other pilots, he has also accounted for four others. On 23 August, in a bombing raid, one of our machines, compelled to descend owing to engine trouble, was heavily engaged by anti-aircraft fire. Observing this, Lt. Payton, with great courage, attacked the hostile batteries at a very low altitude, silencing several of them.

He was also posthumously awarded the Belgian Croix de guerre on 15 July 1919.
