= Walter Tyrrell =

British First WWI flying ace (1898–1918)

Walter Alexander Tyrrell
- Born: 23 August 1898; Belfast, Ireland
- Died: 9 June 1918 (aged 19); Oise, France
- Burial place: Beauvais Communal Cemetery, Beauvais, France; 49°26′25″N 2°05′12″E
- Military career
- Allegiance: United Kingdom
- Branch: Royal Navy; British Army; Royal Air Force
- Service years: 1914–1915; 1917–1918
- Rank: Captain
- Nickname: Bing
- Units: Royal Naval Armoured Car Division; No. 32 Squadron RFC/RAF
- Conflicts: World War I • Western Front
- Awards: Military Cross

Captain Walter Alexander Tyrrell MC (23 August 1898 – 9 June 1918) was a British First World War flying ace credited with seventeen aerial victories.

== Early life and background ==
Tyrrell was born in Belfast, one of six sons of John Tyrrell, a merchant, alderman and justice of the peace, who was the High Sheriff of Belfast in 1914, and his wife Jeanie (née Todd). The family resided at Fairview Buildings, Crumlin Road. He was educated at the Royal Belfast Academical Institution and the Belfast Municipal Technical Institute.

== World War I ==
Tyrrell joined the Royal Navy, serving in the Royal Naval Air Service's Armoured Car Division as a petty officer from 26 December 1914 until 24 November 1915, under Commander Oliver Locker-Lampson. He spent eight months in Belgium and France, but was discharged after an accident, when an armoured car crushed his foot. He returned to Belfast where he was a member of the Queen's University Belfast Officers' Training Corps and worked as an apprentice motor engineer.

Tyrrell joined the Royal Flying Corps as an officer cadet at Farnborough on 4 April 1917, and was commissioned as a temporary second lieutenant (on probation) on 21 June. On 30 August 1917 he was appointed a flying officer and confirmed in his rank.

He was posted to No. 32 Squadron RFC to fly the Airco DH.5 single-seat fighter, and scored five victories (four shared) between 30 October and 5 December 1917. In early 1918 Tyrrell's squadron was re-equipped with the S.E.5a fighter. On 21 March the Germans launched their Spring Offensive on the Somme Front, and on 7 April Tyrrell claimed three enemy fighters shot down over Lamotte. On 10 April No. 32 Squadron RAF (Note: The Army's Royal Flying Corps (RFC) and the Royal Naval Air Service (RNAS) were merged to form the Royal Air Force on 1 April 1918.) was assigned to operations further north over the Lys Front, where Tyrrell gained two more victories, on 11 and 12 April.

No. 32 Squadron was then tasked with flying as bomber escorts, and on 3 May Tyrrell drove down two Fokker Dr.I's over Frelinghien, and forced down and captured an LVG reconnaissance aircraft near Poperinghe. (Note: This action featured prominently in his citation for the Military Cross.) Early on 8 May the squadron encountered a large formation of Pfalz D.III fighters, shooting down six, of which Tyrrell claimed one. On 18 May 1918 Tyrrell was appointed a flight commander with the temporary rank of captain, and commanded "B" flight.

On 29 May, following a request from the French for air reinforcements, No. 32 Squadron moved south to Fouquerolles. Early on 6 June Tyrrell and Lieutenant J. W. Trusler shared in sending a Pfalz D.III down in flames, and later the same day Tyrrell accounted for two Fokker D.VII fighters, bringing his total to seventeen, making him the highest scoring ace in his squadron, and the fourth highest Irish-born ace.

On 9 June the Germans launched their offensive along the Matz River, and No. 32 Squadron was engaged in ground attack missions. During one of these Tyrrell was killed when his aircraft was shot down by anti-aircraft fire. He is buried in the Communal Cemetery at Beauvais.

On 20 June 1918, only 11 days later, his older brother John Marcus Tyrrell, of the Royal Irish Fusiliers, attached Royal Air Force, was also killed in action. Both men are commemorated on the Queen's University War Memorial in Belfast, and on the Bangor War Memorial, County Down. The settlement of the two brothers' estates prompted a question in Parliament. His oldest brother William Tyrrell (RAF officer) was a rugby player and also served as an army doctor, becoming highly decorated with the Distinguished Service Order and Bar, the Military Cross and the Belgian Croix de Guerre. He would later join the same service in 1920 in which his two brothers were killed in action, and served through the Second World War.

== Awards and citation ==
Tyrrell's award of the Military Cross was gazetted posthumously on 13 September 1918. His citation read:

Temporary Second Lieutenant Walter Alexander Tyrrell, General List, attached Royal Air Force.

"For conspicuous gallantry and devotion to duty. On one day this officer attacked two enemy triplanes, destroying one and driving down the other out of control. After this he was attacked by two other machines, one of which he forced to land, taking the occupants prisoners. On various other occasions he has destroyed or driven down out of control enemy machines."

== List of aerial victories ==
List of aerial victories
No.	Date and time	Aircraft	Opponent	Result	Location	Notes
1	30 October 1917 at 0845–0925	Airco DH.5	Albatros D.V	Destroyed	Passchendaele	Shared with Captain William Raymond Fish.
2	11 November 1917 at 15:50	DH.5	Albatros D.V	Out of control	Poelcapelle	
3	13 November 1917 at 15:30	DH.5	Type C	Out of control	South-east of Houthoulst Forest	Shared with Captain William Raymond Fish and Second Lieutenants H. C. Leese & A. L. Cuffe.
4	20 November 1917 at 08:00	DH.5	Albatros C	Destroyed in flames	Passchendaele	Shared with Lieutenant Arthur Claydon and Second Lieutenant A. L. Cuffe.
5	5 December 1917 at 08:55	DH.5	Type C	Out of control	Becelaere	Shared with Captain William Pearson.
6	7 April 1918 at 11:15–11:30	S.E.5a	Fokker Dr.I	Destroyed	North-east of Lamotte	
7	7 April 1918 at 11:15–11:30	S.E.5a	Albatros D.V	Destroyed	North-east of Lamotte	
8	7 April 1918 at 11:15–11:30	S.E.5a	Albatros D.V	Out of control	North-east of Lamotte	
9	11 April 1918 at 19:30	S.E.5a	AGO C	Destroyed in flames	North-east of Bray	
10	12 April 1918 at 12:10	S.E.5a	Pfalz D.III	Out of control	West of Steenwerck	
11	3 May 1918 at 12:20-12:35	S.E.5a	Fokker Dr.I	Out of control	Frelinghien	
12	3 May 1918 at 12:20-12:35	S.E.5a	Fokker Dr.I	Out of control	Frelinghien	
13	3 May 1918 at 12:20-12:35	S.E.5a	LVG C	Captured	1 mile (1.6 km) west-south-west of Poperinghe	
14	8 May 1918 at 09:40	S.E.5a	Pfalz D.III	Destroyed	Sailly-en-Ostrevent	
15	6 June 1918 at 05:50	S.E.5a	Pfalz D.III	Destroyed in flames	Romagnies	Shared with Lieutenant J. W. Trusler.
16	6 June 1918 at 18:45–18:50	S.E.5a	Fokker D.VII	Destroyed in flames	Montdidier	
17	6 June 1918 at 18:45–18:50	S.E.5a	Fokker D.VII	Out of control	Montdidier	
