= Finding Out =

Defunct British educational weekly magazine

Finding Out: The modern magazine for young people everywhere was a British weekly educational magazine for children. Its readership was worldwide, but mainly in Britain and the Commonwealth. First published in 1962 by Purnell and Sons Ltd, for several years it was a competitor to Look and Learn. In 1967, the two publications amalgamated. Prior to the amalgamation, it appeared every week for 240 issues, the first 72 being numbered 1 to 72, and from then on volume 7 to 20, each volume having 12 issues. It initially sold for 1s 6d, eventually rising to 2s 6d. Readers could buy binders for each volume.

Topics covered included maths, science, history, geography and French language, and each issue included a short story. It was noted for its illustrations, which were by some of the top book illustrators of the day, Angus McBride being the foremost and also including Janet and Anne Grahame Johnstone. Later issues included one or two photos.

The publication generally didn't include free gifts. However, one exception to this was a set of four reproductions of famous paintings issued around 1964. These were approximately 11 cm × 16 cm and came complete with frames folded out of cardboard. The paintings were:

- "Mares and Foals" by George Stubbs
- "The Hay Wain" by John Constable
- "The Fighting Temeraire" by J. M. W. Turner
- "The Grand Canal" by Canaletto.

They were issued one per week. The frames included tabs through which pins could be pushed to fix the picture on a wall. It was possible to hang them up either in "portrait" or "landscape" format. All four pictures were in "landscape" format, so maybe a further issue was planned which never materialized.
