= Alfred Miles =

Alfred Miles may refer to:

- Alfred Henry Miles (1848–1929), English author, editor, anthologist, journalist, composer, and lecturer
- Alf Miles (1884–1926), English footballer
- Alfred Hart Miles, US Navy officer, lyricist of the US Naval Academy fight song "Anchors Aweigh"
- Alfred Miles (GC) (1899–1989), able seaman aboard HMS Saltash (J62) and George Cross recipient
- Alfred B. Miles (1888–1962), biology and physiology professor and American football, basketball, and baseball coach

== See also ==
- Alfred Mills (disambiguation)
