= Edward Grahame Johnstone =

British flying ace (1899–1946)

- Born: 6 May 1899; Tooting, London, England
- Died: 19 April 1946 (aged 46); Paddington, London, England
- Spouse: Doris Zinkeisen (m. 1927)
- Relatives: Janet and Anne Grahame Johnstone (daughters)
- Military career
- Allegiance: United Kingdom
- Branch: Royal Navy; Royal Air Force
- Service years: 1917–1919; 1939–1945
- Rank: Lieutenant
- Units: No. 12 Squadron RNAS; No. 208 Squadron RAF
- Conflicts: World War I; Western Front; World War II
- Awards: Distinguished Service Cross

Lieutenant Edward Grahame Johnstone (6 May 1899 – 19 April 1946) was a British World War I flying ace credited with 17 aerial victories.

== Biography ==
He was born in Tooting, London, England, the son of Edward Henderson Johnstone and Stella Johnstone (née Fraser).

=== First World War ===
Johnstone joined the Royal Naval Air Service on his 18th birthday, 6 May 1917. After training with No. 12 Naval Squadron as a temporary probationary flight officer, he was commissioned as a temporary flight sub-lieutenant on 19 August 1917.

He was assigned to fly Sopwith Camels in No. 8 Naval Squadron (which later became No. 208 Squadron RAF). He scored his first triumph on 6 December 1917, followed by 16 more over the next eight months. His final tally was four enemy aircraft destroyed, three of which were shared with other British pilots, and thirteen driven down out of control, eight of which were shared, most frequently with William Jordon and Pruett Dennett.

Johnstone was transferred to the unemployed list of the RAF on 11 April 1919.

=== Inter-war life and family ===
During the 1920s Johnstone travelled throughout Asia, while working for Johnnie Walker. In 1927 he married the artist and designer Doris Clare Zinkeisen (1898–1991) in Marylebone, London. They had twin daughters Janet and Anne in 1928, and a son, Murray.

=== Second World War ===
During the Second World War Johnstone returned to the Royal Navy, serving as a lieutenant in the Royal Naval Volunteer Reserve from December 1939. By August 1943 he had been appointed an acting-commander, and by July 1945 was a temporary acting captain, posted to HMS Vulture, the Royal Naval Air Station at St. Merryn, Cornwall.

Johnstone died in Paddington on 19 April 1946.

== Awards and citations ==
Distinguished Service Cross
Flight Sub-Lieutenant Edward Grahame Johnstone, RNAS.

"For the pluck and determination shown by him in engaging enemy aircraft. On the 19th January, 1918, he attacked five Albatross scouts, and engaged one, nose on, opening fire at 75 yards range. The enemy aircraft turned on its side and spun. He followed, and engaged again at 30 yards range. The enemy aircraft went down completely out of control. Later in the day, in a general engagement with fourteen Albatross scouts, he followed one down to 8,000 feet, firing all the time. This is confirmed by other pilots of the patrol to have fallen completely out of control. On several other occasions he has destroyed enemy machines or brought them down completely out of control."
