= William Lewis Wells =

British World War I flying ace

- Born: 1895; Hounslow, Middlesex, England
- Died: 6 May 1918 (aged 22–23)
- Burial place: St. Sever Cemetery, Rouen, France; 49°24′34″N 1°03′54″E
- Military career
- Allegiance: United Kingdom
- Branch: British Army; Royal Air Force
- Service years: 1914–1918
- Rank: Captain
- Units: London Regiment; Middlesex Regiment; No. 22 Squadron RFC; No. 48 Squadron RFC
- Awards: Military Cross & bar

Captain William Lewis Wells MC & Bar (1895 – 6 May 1918) was a British World War I flying ace credited with ten aerial victories. His exceptional valour twice won him the Military Cross.

== Early life ==
Wells was born in Hounslow, Middlesex, England. He was appointed a Temporary Boy Clerk in the General Post Office on 8 March 1911.

== World War I ==
Wells served as a private in the 8th (City of London) Battalion, The London Regiment (Post Office Rifles), until commissioned a second lieutenant in the Middlesex Regiment on 25 March 1915.

On 22 September 1916 he was appointed a flying officer, seconded to the Royal Flying Corps. He was promoted to lieutenant in the RFC on 1 February 1917, but had to wait until 23 June before receiving the same step up in his regiment.

By early 1918, he had been posted to No. 22 Squadron to fly a Bristol F.2 Fighter two-seater. He scored his first aerial victory on 25 January 1918. By 16 March, he had run his score to six. On 19 March 1918 he was appointed a flight commander with the temporary rank of captain in No. 48 Squadron, and he scored his seventh victory with them on 21 March 1918. Two days later, he rounded out his score list with a triple triumph.

His exploits twice won him the Military Cross. On 13 May 1918, his first MC was gazetted:

"On four occasions during three months, he has been engaged with superior enemy formations, and has brought down completely out of control five hostile machines and sent down one other crashing to earth. He has displayed the greatest gallantry, courage, and determination in dealing with enemy aircraft."

His second award came as a Bar to his MC, and was gazetted 22 June 1918. Note that it was not granted solely for his air-to-air combat:

"He frequently attacked enemy troops and transport with bombs and machine-gun fire during operations, often flying at a very low altitude under heavy fire. While attacking enemy troops from a height of 150 feet he was severely wounded, but succeeded in bringing his observer and machine back safely. He has destroyed five enemy machines and driven down five others out of control, and has always set an example of courage and determination to the flight which he has commanded."

However, Wells never got to read the praise for his gallantry as he died from wounds sustained in action one week before his first award, on 6 May 1918. He was buried in the officers section, plot B. 4. 25, St. Sever Cemetery, Rouen, France.

== List of aerial victories ==
Combat record
No.	Date/Time	Aircraft/ Serial No.	Opponent	Result	Location	Notes
No. 22 Squadron RFC
1	25 January 1918 @ 1340 hours	Bristol F.2 Fighter (A2736)	Albatros D.III fighter	Driven down out of control	Southwest of Lille, France	Observer/gunner: Hugh Fitzgerald Moore
2	18 February 1918 @ 1400 hours	Bristol F.2 Fighter (A7251)	German reconnaissance aircraft	Driven down out of control	Seclin, France	Observer/gunner: Hugh Fitzgerald Moore
3	13 March 1918 @ 1630 hours	Bristol F.2 Fighter (A7286)	Albatros D.V fighter	Destroyed	West of Emmerin, France	Observer/gunner: Edward George Herbert Caradoc Williams
4	16 March 1918 @ 1045–1115 hours	Bristol F.2 Fighter (C4808)	Pfalz D.III fighter	Driven down out of control	Oignies, France	Observer/gunner: George S. L. Hayward
5	16 March 1918 @ 1045–1115 hours	Bristol F.2 Fighter (C4808)	Pfalz D.III fighter	Driven down out of control	Oignies, France	Observer/gunner: George S. L. Hayward
6	16 March 1918 @ 1045–1115 hours	Bristol F.2 Fighter (C4808)	Pfalz D.III fighter	Destroyed	Beaumont, France	Observer/gunner: George S. L. Hayward
No. 48 Squadron RFC
7	21 March 1918 @ 1420 hours	Bristol F.2 Fighter (C4707)	Pfalz D.III fighter	Destroyed	Southwest of Honnecourt	Observer/gunner: Walter Beales
8	23 March 1918 @ 1124 hours	Bristol F.2 Fighter (C4707)	LVG reconnaissance aircraft	Destroyed	Northwest of Hem, France	Observer/gunner: Walter Beales. Shared with Lieutenant Andrew Cowper.
9	23 March 1918 @ 1625 hours	Bristol F.2 Fighter (C4707)	LVG reconnaissance aircraft	Destroyed	Matigny, France	Observer/gunner: Walter Beales
10	23 March 1918 @ 1625 hours	Bristol F.2 Fighter (C4707)	Pfalz D.III fighter	Destroyed	Matigny, France	Observer/gunner: Walter Beales

== See also ==
- Aerial victory standards of World War I
