= Edmund Tempest =

British flying ace (1894–1921)

Edmund Roger Tempest
- Born: 30 October 1894; Ackworth, Yorkshire, England
- Died: 17 December 1921 (aged 27); Baghdad, Iraq
- Burial place: North Gate War Cemetery, Baghdad
- Military career
- Allegiance: United Kingdom
- Branch: British Army; Royal Air Force
- Service years: 1914–1921
- Rank: Flight Lieutenant
- Units: King's Own Yorkshire Light Infantry; No. 6 Squadron RFC; No. 15 Squadron RFC; No. 29 Squadron RFC; No. 64 Squadron RFC/RAF; No. 216 Squadron RAF
- Conflicts: World War I • Western Front
- Awards: Military Cross; Distinguished Flying Cross

Flight Lieutenant Edmund Roger Tempest MC, DFC (30 October 1894 – 17 December 1921) was a British First World War flying ace credited with 17 aerial victories.

== Early life and family background ==
Edmund Tempest was born at the family estate of Ackworth Grange, in Ackworth, Yorkshire, the son of Wilfrid Francis Tempest, a member of the notable recusant Tempest family, and his second wife Florence Helen O'Rourke. (Wilfrid had a total of 15 children from two marriages). Tempest was educated at The Oratory School in Edgbaston. In 1912 he and his brother, Wulstan Joseph Tempest, moved to Perdue, Saskatchewan, to farm, but returned to England to enlist on the outbreak of the war.

== World War I ==
Tempest was commissioned as a temporary second lieutenant on 30 November 1914, to serve in the King's Own Yorkshire Light Infantry. On 18 August 1915 he was granted Royal Aero Club Aviators' Certificate No. 1604 after soloing a Maurice Farman biplane at the Military School in Birmingham, and on 3 November he was appointed a flying officer in the Royal Flying Corps, transferred to the General List.

He served in No. 6, No. 15, and No. 29 Squadrons, receiving promotion to lieutenant on 1 April 1916. He was posted to No. 64 Squadron in July 1917, being appointed a flight commander with the acting rank of captain on the 30th.

Tempest gained his first aerial victory on 30 November 1917 flying an Airco DH.5 single-seat fighter, by driving down out of control an Albatros D.V. His squadron was re-equipped with the S.E.5a fighter in early 1918, and Tempest shot down five enemy aircraft in March. On 1 April 1918, the Royal Flying Corps was merged with the Royal Naval Air Service to form the Royal Air Force, and his unit became No. 64 Squadron RAF. Tempest destroyed two more aircraft that month, then two more in May, also being awarded the Military Cross on the 13th. He accounted for one enemy aircraft in June, and another in July, and finally five in August, before being posted back to England, where on 2 November he was awarded the Distinguished Flying Cross.

Of his brothers, Major Wilfred Norman Tempest, 2nd Battalion (attached 9th Battalion), King's Own Yorkshire Light Infantry, was killed in action on 26 September 1916, and is commemorated on the Thiepval Memorial, while Major Wulstan Joseph Tempest also served in the KOYLI and Royal Flying Corps, shooting down Zeppelin L.31 over Potters Bar on 1 October 1916 while serving in No. 39 (Home Defence) Squadron. He was subsequently awarded the Military Cross and the Distinguished Service Order.

== List of aerial victories ==
Combat record
| No. | Date/Time | Aircraft/ Serial No. | Opponent | Result | Location | Notes |
|---|---|---|---|---|---|---|
| 1 | 30 November 1917 @ 1520 | D.H.5 (A9507) | Albatros D.V | Out of control | North-west of Bourlon Wood | |
| 2 | 8 March 1918 @ 1230 | S.E.5a | Albatros D.V | Destroyed | Graincourt | |
| 3 | 17 March 1918 @ 1130–1135 | S.E.5a | Pfalz D.III | Destroyed | Douai | |
| 4 | 17 March 1918 @ 1130–1135 | S.E.5a | Pfalz D.III | Out of control | Biache | Shared with Lieutenants J. F. T. Barrett & Charles Bissonette, and Second Lieutenants C. B. Stringer & K. G. P. Hendrie. |
| 5 | 18 March 1918 @ 1235 | S.E.5a | Albatros D.V | Out of control | Cambrai | |
| 6 | 22 March 1918 @ 1745 | S.E.5a (C5392) | Pfalz D.III | Destroyed | Pronville | |
| 7 | 2 April 1918 @ 1835 | S.E.5a (B74) | Albatros D.V | Destroyed in flames | Ervillers | |
| 8 | 23 April 1918 @ 1835 | S.E.5a (B74) | Albatros D.V | Destroyed | Boiry-Notre-Dame | |
| 9 | 3 May 1918 @ 1645 | S.E.5a (B74) | Pfalz D.III | Destroyed | Vitry-en-Artois | |
| 10 | 31 May 1918 @ 0625 | S.E.5a (C1860) | Albatros D.V | Destroyed | North-west of Steenwerck | |
| 11 | 12 June 1918 @ 1230 | S.E.5a (B74) | Albatros C | Destroyed in flames | Festubert | |
| 12 | 20 July 1918 @ 0925 | S.E.5a | Rumpler C | Destroyed | Drocourt | Shared with Captain Philip Burge and Lieutenant W. R. Henderson. |
| 13 | 10 August 1918 @ 0840 | S.E.5a (B74) | Fokker D.VII | Destroyed | Roye | |
| 14 | 11 August 1918 @ 0815 | S.E.5a (B74) | Fokker D.VII | Out of control | Roye | Shared with Captains T. St. P. Bunbury, A. F. Buck, & Charles Cudemore, and Lieutenants Thomas Rose & G. L. Wood. |
| 15 | 11 August 1918 @ 1515 | S.E.5a (B74) | Fokker D.VII | Destroyed | Roye | |
| 16 | 12 August 1918 @ 0715 | S.E.5a | Fokker D.VII | Destroyed | Chaulnes | |
| 17 | 14 August 1918 @ 0910 | S.E.5a | Type C | Out of control | North of Roye | Shared with Lieutenants Thomas Rose & G. L. Wood. |

== Post-war career and death ==
Tempest remained in the RAF after the war, being granted a permanent commission with the rank of captain on 1 August 1919. On 17 December 1921 his Airco DH.10 Amiens crashed on takeoff at an aerodrome in West Baghdad and died as a result of his injuries. Flt/Lt Tempest was serving with 6 Squadron RAF at the time of his death (not 216 Sqn as is often seen to be reported) and his name is on the 6 Squadron Roll of Honour in the history room at RAF Lossiemouth in Scotland. However, he was flying a 216 Squadron aircraft which was attached to 30 Squadron at that time. He was attempting to carry out a mail run from Baghdad to Cairo on behalf of the regular pilot who was in hospital. He is buried in North Gate War Cemetery, Baghdad Plot 23 Row M Grave 4.

== Honours and awards ==
Military Cross
Temporary Captain Edmund Roger Tempest, General List and Royal Flying Corps.

"For conspicuous gallantry and devotion to duty. He attacked a formation of seven enemy machines, firing on one from a distance of a few feet and destroying it. On another occasion with his patrol he engaged thirteen enemy machines. Though both his guns were out of action, he continued fighting for fifteen minutes in order to enable the rest of his patrol to keep up the fight. Having driven off the enemy, he brought his patrol back safely. He showed splendid courage and initiative."

Distinguished Flying Cross
Captain Edmund Roger Tempest, MC.

"Since March last this officer has destroyed nine enemy machines. A daring and most capable officer, who never hesitates to engage the enemy. By brilliant leadership he achieves success with the minimum of loss.
