= Guillaucourt station =

Railway station in Guillaucourt, France

Guillaucourt

General information
- Location: Place de la Gare; Guillaucourt
- Coordinates: 49°50′42″N 2°38′5″E
- Owner: RFF/SNCF
- Line: Amiens–Laon railway

Other information
- Station code: 87313452
Location

Guillaucourt is a former railway station located in the commune of Guillaucourt in the Somme department, France. The station was served by TER Picardie trains from Amiens to Saint-Quentin.

== See also ==
- List of SNCF stations in Hauts-de-France
