= Alfred Mills (flying ace) =

British flying ace of World War I

Alfred Stanley Mills
- Born: 26 June 1899; Belfast, Ireland
- Died: Unknown
- Military career
- Allegiance: United Kingdom
- Branch: British Army; Royal Air Force
- Rank: Lieutenant
- Unit: No. 20 Squadron RAF
- Awards: Distinguished Flying Cross

Lieutenant Alfred Stanley Mills (born 26 June 1899 – date of death unknown) was a World War I flying ace credited with 15 aerial victories.

Mills graduated from Campbell College, Belfast before joining the service. In 1916, he was received at Somerville Hospital in Oxford. After being assigned to No. 20 Squadron RAF as an observer gunner, he won his first dogfight by setting afire a Fokker Dr.I on 9 May 1918. In the end of May, he had eight wins to his credit. On 2 July he was awarded the Distinguished Flying Cross. He tallied only a single kill in July, on the 24th. His last six victories came in September 1918. In summary, only three of his victories were the "soft" out of control sort, and all but two were over enemy fighter aircraft.

Mills won nine times while being piloted by Captain Thomas Middleton, and three while Lieutenant Paul Iaccaci was at the helm.

== Honours and awards ==
Distinguished Flying Cross
Second Lieutenant (Honorary Lieutenant) Alfred Mills.

"A capable and gallant observer who has been very successful in destroying enemy machines by reason of excellent marksmanship. He has accounted for many enemy aircraft in a short period of time, and has generally fought against larger formations than his own".

Mills was deprived of his Distinguished Flying Cross on account of being sentenced to imprisonment for theft. His service record quotes from the Daily Express of 11 October 1924.
