= Lawrence Coombes =

British engineer

Lawrence Percival Coombes
- Born: 9 April 1899; Madras, India
- Died: 2 June 1988 (aged 89); Melbourne, Australia
- Military career
- Allegiance: United Kingdom
- Branch: Royal Navy; Royal Air Force
- Service years: 1917–1919
- Rank: Captain
- Units: No. 12 Squadron RNAS; No. 10 Squadron RNAS/No. 210 Squadron RAF
- Conflicts: World War I
- Awards: Distinguished Flying Cross; Commander of the Order of the British Empire
- Other work: Aeronautical engineer

Lawrence Percival Coombes CBE, DFC (9 April 1899 – 3 June 1988) was a British-Australian aeronautical engineer who served as the first Chief Superintendent of the Australian Aeronautical Research Laboratories from 1938 until 1964. He had previously worked at the Royal Aircraft Establishment from 1924, and during World War I had served as a pilot in the Royal Naval Air Service and Royal Air Force, becoming a flying ace credited with 15 aerial victories.

== Early life and education ==
Coombes was born in Madras, India, and educated in London. From 1915 he studied engineering at the City and Guilds College in London, but in July 1917 he took leave of absence from his studies in order to enlist in the Royal Naval Air Service.

== Military career ==
Coombes was assigned to HMS President on 22 July 1917 as a probationary flight officer, and attended the training schools at Air Stations Chingford and Cranwell, before being awarded his Royal Aero Club Aviator's Certificate at Air Station Fairlop on 20 September.

He was promoted to flight sub-lieutenant on 28 September, and posted to HMS Daedalus in November. Coombes was eventually sent to France, and was initially assigned to No. 12 Naval Squadron based at Air Station Dunkirk from 11 January 1918, but was reassigned to No. 10 Naval Squadron two weeks later. Flying the Sopwith Camel, Coombes gained his first aerial victory on 24 March, destroying an Albatros D.V over Menin-Roulers. By the time of his second victory on 9 April (another D.V destroyed north of La Bassée), the Royal Naval Air Service had been merged with the Army's Royal Flying Corps to form the Royal Air Force, and No. 10 Naval Squadron had been renamed No. 210 Squadron RAF. Coombes drove down three more enemy aircraft in May, and on 12 June he was appointed acting-captain while serving as a flight commander. In June and July he was credited with shooting down ten more aircraft, bringing his total number of victories to fifteen.

Coombes was awarded the Distinguished Flying Cross (DFC) on 3 August, then returned to England to spend the rest of the war serving as an instructor at No. 204 Training Depot Station at RAF Eastchurch.

Coombes left the RAF on 17 April 1919, and spent the rest of the summer barnstorming around the north of England in surplus B.E.2's with Charles Kingsford Smith before returning to City and Guilds College, to finally receive his Engineering degree in mid-1920.

== Engineering career ==
After four years working for C. A. Parsons & Co. in Newcastle upon Tyne, Coombes joined the Royal Aircraft Establishment as a Scientific Officer in the Aerodynamics Department. A year later, in 1925, he moved to the Marine Aircraft Experimental Establishment at Felixstowe, where he also acted as a technical advisor to the RAF's High Speed Flight, competing for the 1927 Schneider Trophy.

Coombes remained a member of the Reserve of Air Force Officers (RAFO), being promoted to flying officer on 29 May 1923, but eventually relinquished his commission on 29 May 1926.

In 1930, he returned to the Royal Aircraft Establishment where he was in charge of the Seaplane Tank. In 1938 Coombes emigrated to Melbourne, Australia, after being appointed the first Chief Superintendent of the Aeronautical Research Laboratories (ARL). In 1949 ARL was transferred to the Research and Development Branch of the Department of Supply, becoming one of the Defence Science Laboratories. In 1960, while serving as an advisor for the United Nations, Coombes helped India establish its first Aeronautical Research Laboratory.

Coombes retired in 1964, and in June was made a Commander of the Order of the British Empire "for services to aviation".

Coombes died in Melbourne on 3 June 1988.

== Personal life ==
On 6 April 1926 he married Annie Marie ("Nancy") Lee, and they had two daughters; Shirley Ruth (b. 1928) and Josephine (b. 1932).

== Honours and awards ==
Other awards and honours presented to Coombes include:

- Freeman of the City of London for war services (1918)
- Fellow of the Royal Aeronautical Society (1945)
- Fellow of the Institute of Aeronautical Sciences (1953)
- Fellow of the City and Guilds Institute (1953)
- Lawrence Hargrave Memorial Medal (1957)
- Kingsford-Smith Memorial Medal (1962)
- Kernot Medal, University of Melbourne (1968)
- Doctor of Engineering, Honoris Causa, Monash University (1975)
- Fellow of Australian Academy of Technological Sciences (1975)
