= August Thayer Jaccaci =

American WWI flying ace

August Thayer Iaccaci, Sr.
- Born: 6 June 1893; Hingham, Massachusetts
- Died: 30 April 1980 (aged 86); Madison, Connecticut
- Relatives: Paul Thayer Iaccaci (brother)
- Military career
- Allegiance: United States
- Branch: Royal Flying Corps
- Rank: Captain
- Units: No. 20 Squadron RAF; No. 48 Squadron RAF
- Conflicts: World War I
- Awards: Distinguished Flying Cross

Captain August Thayer Iaccaci, Sr. (6 June 1893 – 30 April 1980) was a US-born World War I flying ace who, together with his gunners, was credited with 17 aerial victories.

== Biography ==
He was born to Augusto Florian Iaccaci (1857–1930) and Mabel Thayer on 6 June 1893 in Hingham, Massachusetts. He had a brother, Paul Thayer Iaccaci. He attended Princeton University, while his brother attended Harvard University.

He worked for H. K. McCann Co. until he went to Canada and joined the Royal Flying Corps along with his older brother Paul in 1917. They both were assigned to No. 20 Squadron in Calais, France to pilot Bristol F.2 Fighters.

He scored his first victory on 19 May 1918, over a Pfalz D.III fighter; on 31 May, he became an ace with his fourth and fifth wins; coincidentally, his brother matched his feat with his fourth and fifth victories on the same day. By September, he ran his total to 11 destroyed, 5 (and 1 shared) "out of control". His score of 17 equaled his brother's. His usual observer was Sgt. Arthur Ernest Newland, an ace in his own right. With the exception of one reconnaissance two-seater, August Iaccaci triumphed over German fighter planes and pilots. He was then appointed a flight commander with No. 48 Squadron in October. Late that month, an eye wound hospitalized him in Britain for the remainder of the war.

He returned home to New York City on 9 May 1919 aboard the RMS Baltic. His father died on 22 July 1930 at Châteauneuf-Grasse in France and named his son as his heir.

He married and had a son, August Thayer Jaccaci, Jr.

He died on 30 August 1980 in Madison, Connecticut of natural causes.

== Honors and awards ==
Distinguished Flying Cross

Lieut. August Thayer Iaccaci. This officer has taken part in many engagements, and he and his observer have been most successful in destroying enemy machines. A resolute and skilful airman.

== See also ==
- List of World War I flying aces from the United States
