= Spital, Derbyshire =

Area in Chesterfield, Derbyshire, UK

Spital is a suburb of the town of Chesterfield in the Borough of Chesterfield, Derbyshire, England. It is situated towards the east of Chesterfield town centre. The main road here is Spital Lane. With new estates being built, businesses include the Co-op, formerly the Spital Pub and Willbond(formally, Spital Tile Co.). Spital also has 2 parks one located at the top of Valley Road the other is along Spital Lane heading towards Calow Lane. Spital also has a cemetery. The Cemetery being one of the oldest walled garden cemeteries in Derbyshire.

== Spital Cemetery ==
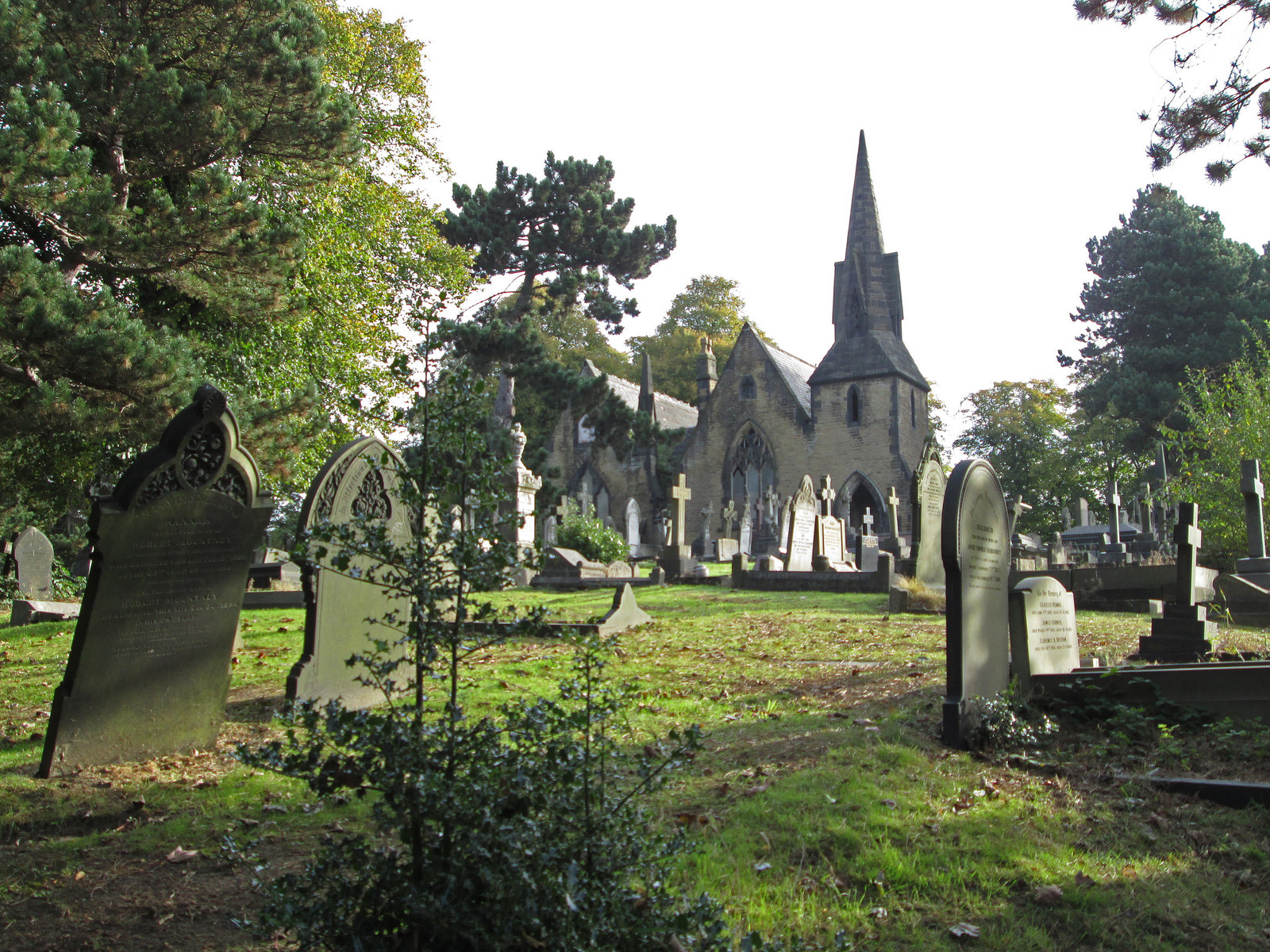
Spital Cemetery Chapel - from west

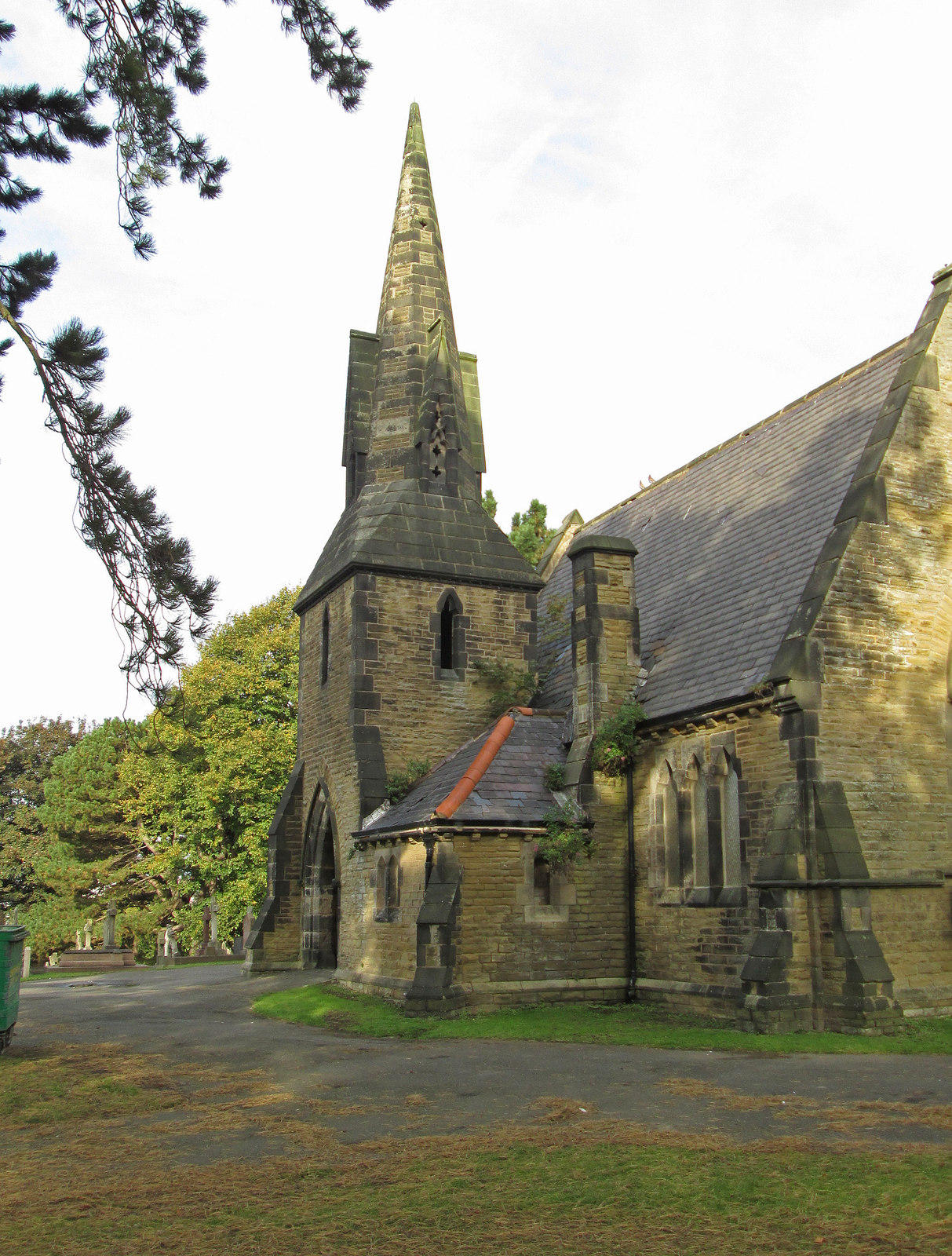
Spital Cemetery Chapel - from south-east

Situated three quarters of a mile from the town centre, Spital Cemetery was in 1857 the first public cemetery to be opened in Chesterfield to serve the local communities of Chesterfield and Tapton. The cemetery provides approximately 10.5 acres (4.25 hectares) of burial space. There are two entrances, both off the A632 road at Hady Hill.

The lodge at the lower of the two entrances on Hady Hill is a Grade II listed building.

The 19th century saw a huge cemetery building programme in response to population growth and an increase in the demands of non-Anglican denominations. The majority were laid out on a garden plan with a cemetery chapel at their heart, and these (like Spital Church and Chapel) were divided to provide Anglican and Nonconformist accommodation.

The church and chapel are Grade II listed, but are no longer used for burial services. The chapel has two aspires, one in the form of an obelisk and the other a broach spire above the entrance porch. It has deteriorating masonry and water penetration exacerbated by lead theft from the valleys in the roof. Take a stroll around the old graves and read the head stones. Also you will find a lot of head stones laid down because they have become unstable in the 100 or so years they have been there, also respect the graves, keep pets on a lead whilst in the cemetery, dotted around the cemetery are bins for you to put your pets waste in. At the bottom of the cemetery to the right of the bottom entrance near the Lodge is still an active burial ground for residents who have passed.

In 2012, the cemetery church and chapel were featured in the annual catalogue of buildings at risk published by the conservation charity, "SAVE Britain's Heritage". Each year, this heritage group shines a spotlight on 100 or so historic buildings in need of repair throughout England and Wales. The building is owned by a private individual who is hoping to convert it into a dwelling.
