= Sailly, Ardennes =

Sailly
- Commune
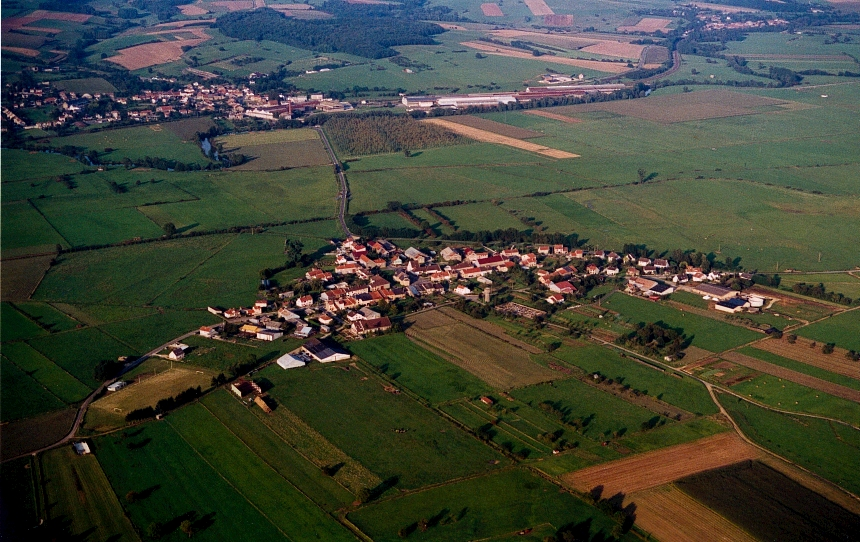
- An aerial view of Sailly

- Coat of arms
- Location of Sailly
- Location within France Location within Grand Est
- Coordinates: 49°36′43″N 5°10′33″E
- Country: France
- Region: Grand Est
- Department: Ardennes
- Arrondissement: Sedan
- Canton: Carignan

Government
  - Mayor (2020–2026): Jérôme Prudhomme
- Area^{1}: 12.8 km^{2} (4.9 sq mi)
- Elevation: 168 m (551 ft)
- Highest elevation: 343 m (1,125 ft)
- Lowest elevation: 162 m (531 ft)
- Population (2023): 249
  - Density: 19.5/km^{2} (50.4/sq mi)
- Time zone: UTC+01:00 (CET)
  - Summer (DST): UTC+02:00 (CEST)
- INSEE/Postal code: 08376 /08110
- ^{1} French Land Register data, which excludes lakes, ponds, glaciers > 1 km^{2} (0.386 sq mi or 247 acres) and river estuaries.

Sailly is a commune in the Ardennes department in northern France.

== Population ==
Historical population
Year	Pop.	±% p.a.
1968	355	—
1975	296	−2.56%
1982	281	−0.74%
1990	245	−1.70%
1999	223	−1.04%
2007	207	−0.93%
2012	268	+5.30%
2017	253	−1.15%
2023	249	−0.27%
Source: INSEE

== See also ==
- Communes of the Ardennes department
