= Paul Thayer Iaccaci =

American WWI flying ace (1890-1965)

- Paul Thayer Iaccaci. 1918
- Born: 26 July 1890; Paris, France
- Died: August 8, 1965 (aged 75); Darien, Connecticut, United States
- Relatives: August Thayer Jaccaci (brother)
- Military career
- Allegiance: United States
- Branch: Royal Flying Corps
- Rank: Lieutenant
- Unit: No. 20 Squadron RAF
- Conflicts: World War I
- Awards: Distinguished Flying Cross

Captain Paul Thayer Iaccaci (pronounced ya-catchy 26 July 1890 – 8 August 1965) was a World War I flying ace credited with 17 aerial victories.

== Biography ==
He was born to Auguste Florian Iaccaci (1857-1930) and Mabel Thayer on 26 July 1890. His brother was August Thayer Jaccaci.

He attended Harvard College from 1909 to 1911. From June 1913 to December 1916 he and his younger brother August served with the 7th Regiment N.Y.N.G; they both went to Canada and joined the Royal Flying Corps in 1917. They both were assigned to No. 20 Squadron in Calais, France to pilot Bristol F.2 Fighters. He scored his first victory on 18 May 1918, over a Fokker Dr.I fighter. On 31 May, he became an ace with his fourth and fifth wins; August coincidentally recorded his fourth and fifth the same day. By September, he had run his total to 17, the same score as his brother. He triumphed over only German fighter planes and pilots.

He married Marie L. and they divorced on 12 April 1938 in Garland, Arkansas. He later married Hope Norton (1903-1999), she was previously married to George E. Stevens. They had a daughter, Thayer Iaccaci Craw.

He died on 8 August 1965 in Darien, Connecticut.

== Honors and awards ==
Distinguished Flying Cross (DFC)

Lieut. Paul Thayer Iaccaci. A bold and successful fighter, who on four offensive patrols has accounted for six enemy aeroplanes: two he shot down himself, and four were destroyed with the assistance of his observer. In these several encounters the formation in which, Lieut. laccaci was serving was engaged against heavy odds.

== See also ==
- List of World War I flying aces from the United States
