= Guillaucourt =

- Commune
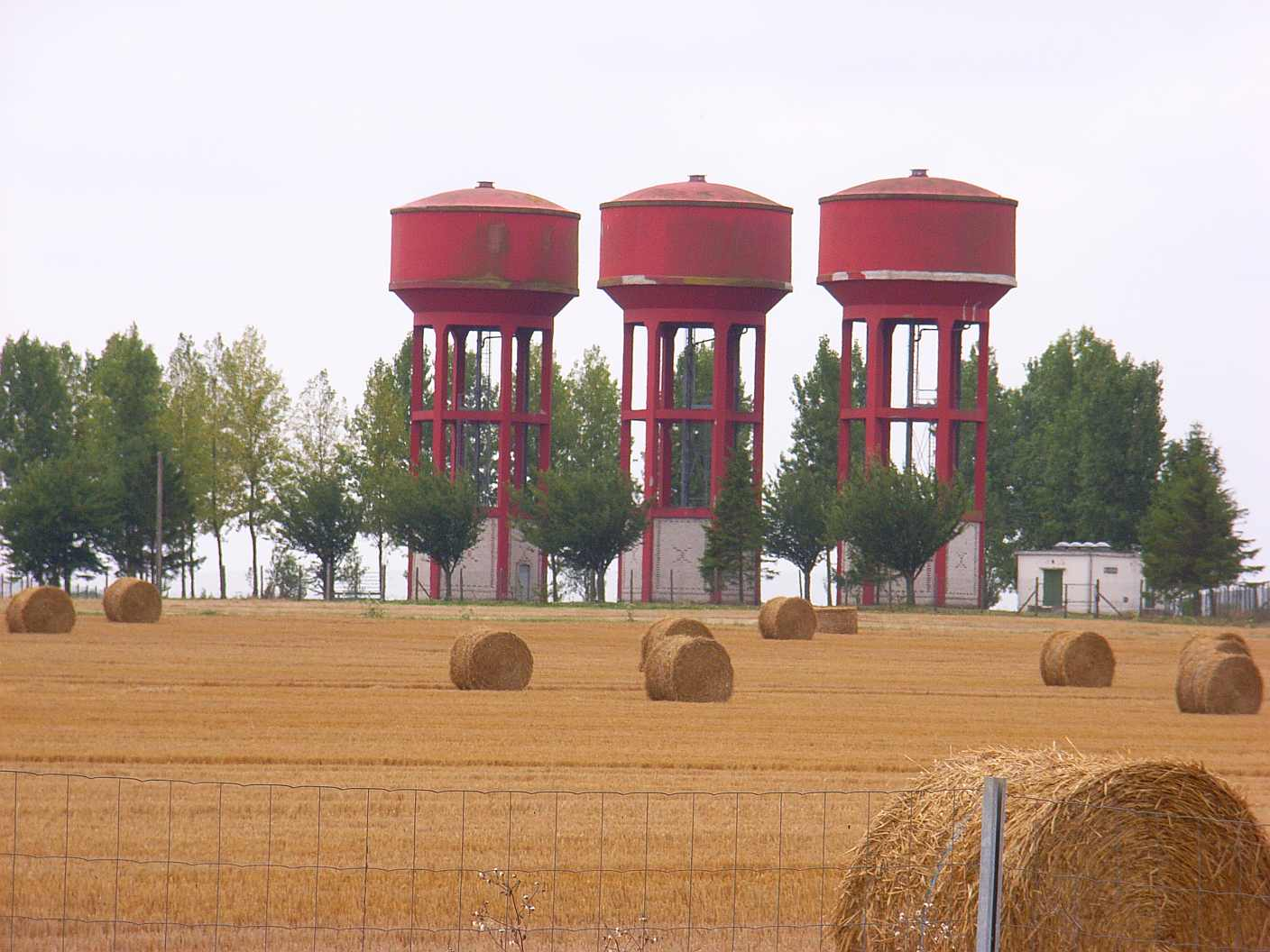
- Water towers in Guillaucourt
- Location of Guillaucourt
- Location within France Location within Hauts-de-France
- Coordinates: 49°50′34″N 2°37′56″E
- Country: France
- Region: Hauts-de-France
- Department: Somme
- Arrondissement: Péronne
- Canton: Moreuil
- Intercommunality: CC Terre de Picardie

Government
  - Mayor (2020–2026): Ludovic Kusnierak
- Area^{1}: 6.37 km^{2} (2.46 sq mi)
- Elevation: 87 m (285 ft)
- Highest elevation: 96 m (315 ft)
- Lowest elevation: 52 m (171 ft)
- Population (2023): 386
  - Density: 60.6/km^{2} (157/sq mi)
- Time zone: UTC+01:00 (CET)
  - Summer (DST): UTC+02:00 (CEST)
- INSEE/Postal code: 80400 /80170
- ^{1} French Land Register data, which excludes lakes, ponds, glaciers > 1 km^{2} (0.386 sq mi or 247 acres) and river estuaries.

Guillaucourt (French pronunciation: [ɡijokuʁ]) is a commune in the Somme department in Hauts-de-France in northern France.

== Geography ==
Guillaucourt is situated 16 miles (26 km) southeast of Amiens at the D165 and D136 junction and very close to the A29 autoroute.

== Population ==
Historical population
| Year | Pop. | ±% p.a. |
|---|---|---|
| 1968 | 340 | — |
| 1975 | 323 | −0.73% |
| 1982 | 302 | −0.96% |
| 1990 | 296 | −0.25% |
| 1999 | 305 | +0.33% |
| 2007 | 382 | +2.85% |
| 2012 | 396 | +0.72% |
| 2017 | 440 | +2.13% |
| 2023 | 386 | −2.16% |
Source: INSEE

== See also ==
- Communes of the Somme department
- Guillaucourt station, a former railway station
