= Badingham =

Civil parish in Suffolk, England

Coordinates: 52.2621°N 1.3805°E

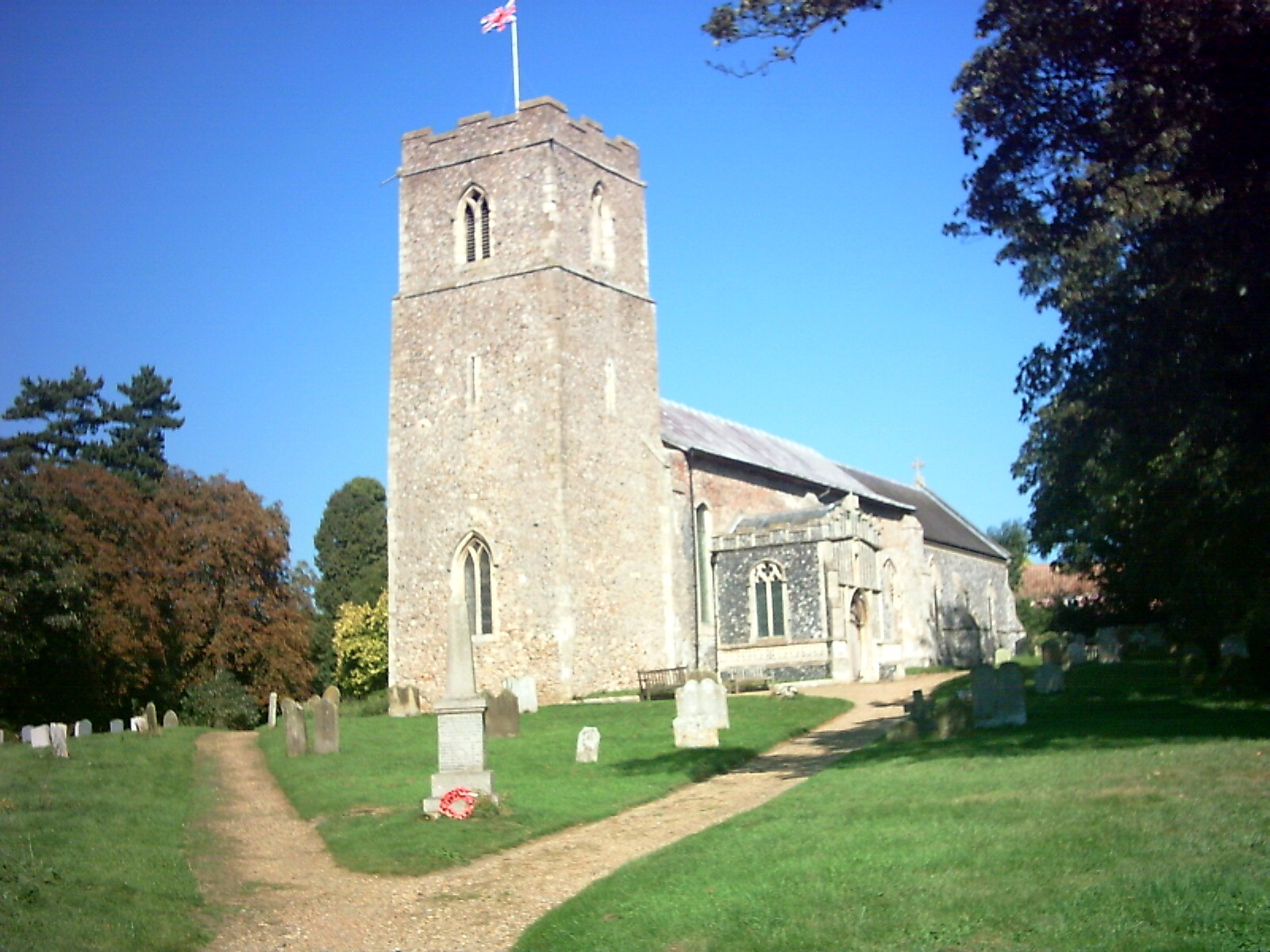
- Church of St John the Baptist, Badingham

- Location within Suffolk
- Interactive map of Badingham
- Population: 489 (2011 Census)
- OS grid reference: TM31826774
- Civil parish: Badingham
- District: East Suffolk
- Shire county: Suffolk
- Region: East
- Country: England
- Sovereign state: United Kingdom
- Post town: Woodbridge
- Postcode district: IP13
- Dialling code: 01728
- Police: Suffolk
- Fire: Suffolk
- Ambulance: East of England

Badingham is a civil parish in the East Suffolk district of eastern England, in the county of Suffolk. It is situated 21.8 miles (35.1 kilometres) north east of Ipswich, 35 miles (56 km) away from Norwich and 13 miles (21 km) away from the coast. The road A1120 cuts through the middle of the parish. Badingham's name is Anglo-Saxon and means "the farmstead of Bada's people". Badingham contains a significant number of farms, sparse amounts of housing, numerous B&Bs, and St. John's Church.

== Population ==
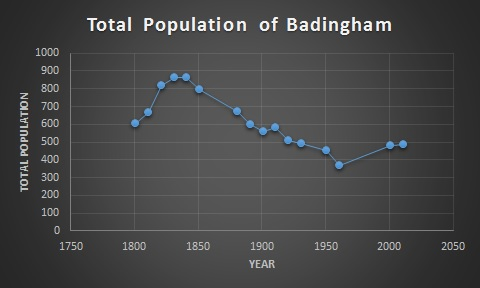
Badinghams total population from 1801– 2011

At the 2011 census, Badingham had a total population of 489. The village's population was at its maximum of 607 in 1801. Out of the 489 residents in 2011, 173 (35%) of residents were over the age of 50, whereas in comparison, there were only 128 people in the 0–20 age group. The aging population has changed the services within the parish towards more care & 50+ services, with no schools.

== Housing ==
In Badingham, a reduction in population over the last century has corresponded with the reduction in dwellings, such as the housing numbers during the years of 1901–1961 where they decreased from 143 to 125. But in the past few decades, there has been an increase in housing in the area, despite the decrease in population, for example from the 2001 to the 2011 census, the number of houses increased from 206 to 228.

== History ==
The earliest historic data of Badingham is located within the Domesday Book of 1086. The findings are indicated below:

"Badincham / Hadincham: Robert Malet's mother and Walter, Loernic and Robert from her. Church, beehive. 60 goats, 32 pigs".

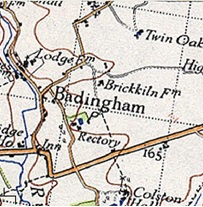
20th-century view of Badingham as shown by the Ordnance Survey map. Located in the county of Suffolk. East England

In the 1730's John Kirby wrote:

"Baddingham:, where the Family of the Alexanders have long resided; the Waldgrave Alexander, Gent. now resides there. The Patronage of the Church is now vested in the Reverend Barrington Blomfield, D.D. who has lately built a neat mansion not far from the church." The Suffolk Traveller, 1735

In the 1870s John Bartholomew, described Badingham as:

"Badingham, par., E. Suffolk, 3½ miles NE. of Framlingham ry. sta., 3172 ac., pop. 672; P.O.(John Bartholomew, Gazetteer of the British Isles (1887))".

=== St John’s Church ===
The parish church is situated on an old pagan holy site called the knoll of Burstonhaugh. The church was built in 1300s and later re-established in 16th century to an old pagan site, by the first missionaries who came to Badingham. Upon sunrise the light shines through the east window, signifying that the church faces north-east to south-west instead of the more usual east–west.

== Village hall ==
The village hall is at the centre of village life and aims to establish an affordable, place where social activity can occur in an otherwise isolated village. The hall itself is a vital focal point for regular activities including: "village meetings and other large group activities and celebrations".

== Badingham Parish Council ==
Badingham's parish is one of the largest within the region of Suffolk Coastal District Council, and extends to more than eleven square miles. The neighbouring parishes are Dennington, Laxfield, Peasenhall, Bruisyard and Cransford.

== Census data ==
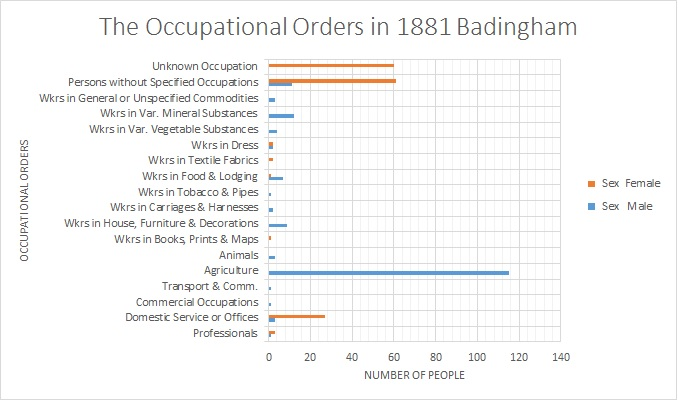
Occupational data of Badingham, 1881

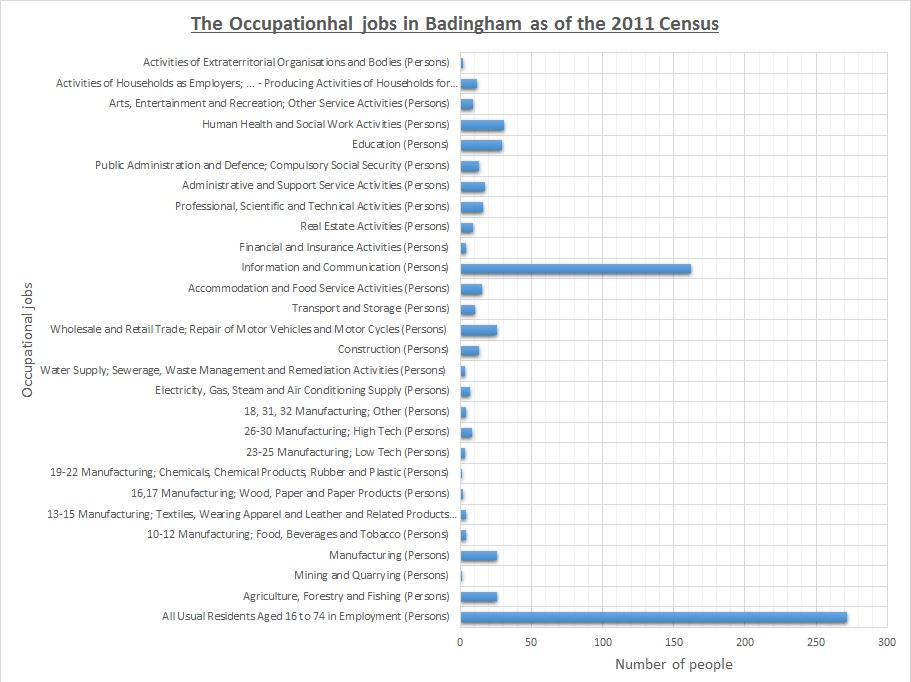
2011 Census data of the occupations in Badingham

The graphs indicate the difference between occupations in the parish of Badingham during 1881 and 2011, showing how times have changed in the village, with the reduction in the number of men employed in the agricultural sector in 1881, compared to 2011 (when men and women were equally represented). The most common occupation is now in information and communications.
