= Ernest Elton =

- Born: Ernest John Elton; 25 December 1893; Wimborne, Dorset, England
- Died: 8 March 1958 (aged 64); Canadian Red Cross Memorial Hospital, Taplow, Buckinghamshire, England
- Military career
- Allegiance: United Kingdom
- Branch: British Army; Royal Air Force
- Service years: 1914–1922
- Rank: Flight Sergeant
- Units: No. 6 Squadron RFC; No. 22 Squadron RAF
- Conflicts: First World War
- Awards: Distinguished Conduct Medal; Military Medal; Bronze Medal of Military Valor (Italy)

Ernest John Elton, DCM, MM (25 December 1893 – 8 March 1958) was the highest scoring British non-commissioned flying ace during the First World War. He was credited with 17 aerial victories.

== Early life ==
He was born in Wimborne Workhouse, the son of Edith Jane Frampton, an unmarried domestic servant from Mannington, and was fostered by local midwife Hannah Elton and her husband Henry, subsequently adopting their surname as his own. As a boy he sang in the choir of Wimborne Minster, and after leaving school was apprenticed at a local Cycle and Carriage Works.

== Military service ==
Elton enlisted in the Royal Flying Corps on 11 August 1914, serving as an air mechanic. (Note: When he enlisted in 1914 his previous occupation was given as a Motor Cycle Mechanic) While serving with No. 6 Squadron in France in June 1915, he assisted Captain Lanoe Hawker in developing a machine gun mount for the Bristol Scout. In late 1916, he returned to England to train as a pilot, and was later assigned to No. 22 Squadron.

On 26 February 1918, Elton piloted a Bristol F.2b Fighter to his first victory, when he destroyed two Albatros D.Vs near Lens. Following the engagement his engine failed, and Elton glided the six miles back to the Allied lines, but crash-landed in no man's land. His observer/gunner Sergeant Hagen had been wounded in the leg, so Elton dragged him out of the aircraft and into a shell hole, then crawled and ran 200 yards to the Allied lines to fetch help. He returned with a first aid man to dress Hagen's wounds, then sat with him until dark, when he was stretchered back to safety. The aircraft was later recovered and was found to be riddled with bullet holes, including in the fuel tank under the pilot's seat.

In the next 31 days, Elton would be credited with destroying twelve more enemy aircraft and driving two down out of control. He scored ten of his wins himself, and his gunner in the rear seat scored six times. His string culminated in a triple victory on 29 March 1918, when he destroyed three German two-seater reconnaissance planes in ten minutes. They were the only two-seaters he ever destroyed; the remainder of his wins were over enemy fighters, principally Albatros D.Vs.

Elton was awarded the Military Medal "for bravery in the Field" in April 1918, and in June was awarded the Distinguished Conduct Medal, his citation reading:

1429 Sjt. E. J. Elton, MM, RAF. For conspicuous gallantry and devotion to duty. During the past month he has destroyed six hostile machines and brought down another out of control. On two of these occasions he has caused two enemy planes to crash to earth, although on each occasion his formation was fighting against very heavy odds. He has at all times displayed the most marked courage, skill and determination.

In September 1918 he was awarded the Bronze Medal of Military Valour by Italy.

Elton was discharged from the Royal Air Force in 1922.
