= Medal for Bravery (Yugoslavia) =

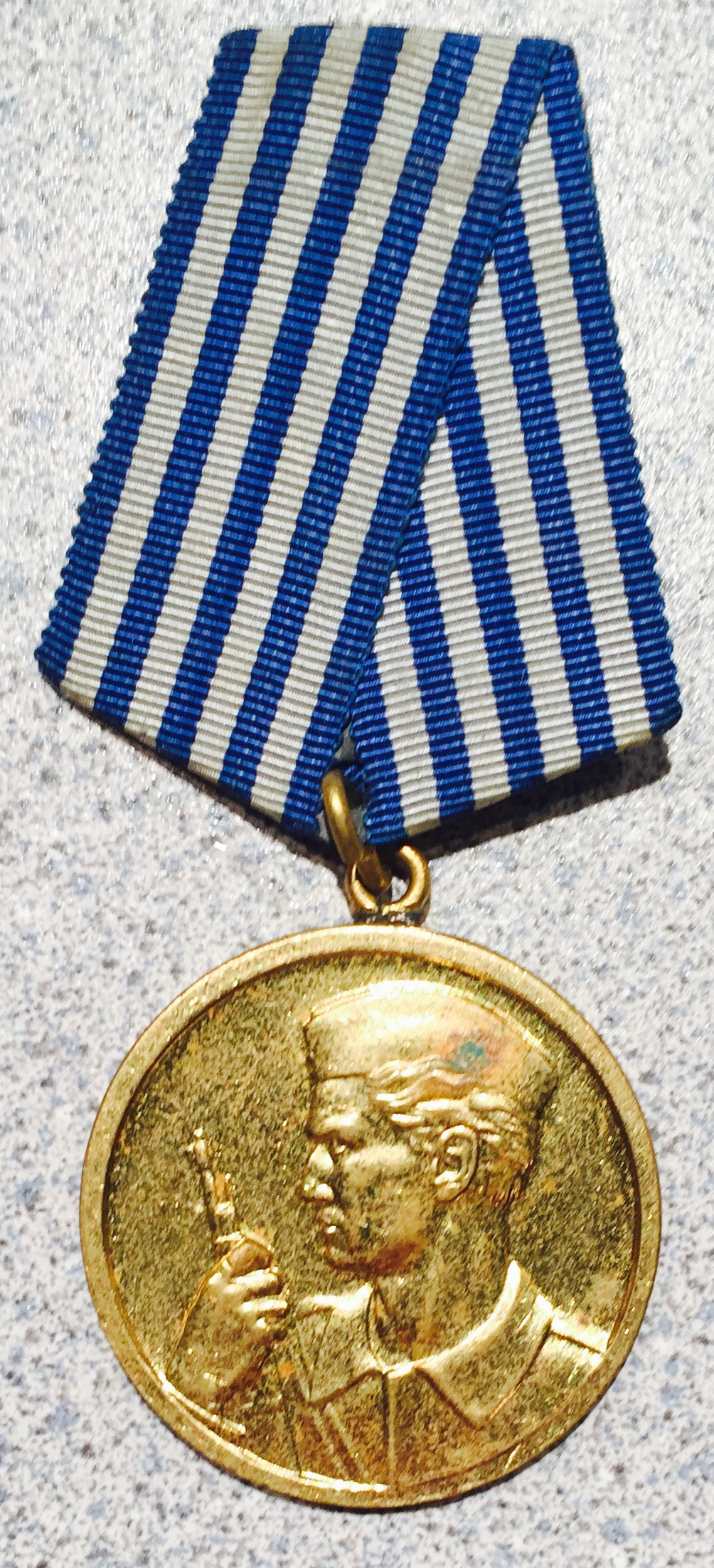
- Awarded for: Extreme bravery in the line of duty
- Presented by: the Yugoslavia
- Eligibility: Soldiers of SFR Yugoslavia and the Yugoslav Partisans of World War II.
- Status: No longer awarded
- Established: August 15, 1943
- First award: 1943
- Final award: early 1990s

Highlights
- Total: 205,590
- Ribbon of the Medal for Bravery

The Medal for Bravery (Serbo-Croatian: Медаља за храброст, Medalja za hrabrost, Macedonian: Медал за храброст, romanized: Medal za hrabrost) was a Yugoslav military award created in 1943 for achievements in the line of duty during World War II. It was initially awarded by the newly created Democratic Federal Yugoslavia for acts of courage in the war, while it was still raging. Once the war ended, Yugoslavia was in a time of peace from 1945 to 1991, being a founding nation of the Non-Aligned Movement, and therefore eligibility for the award included acts of bravery within the nation, thus rendering the medal not obsolete, and it was awarded until the Breakup of Yugoslavia in 1992.
