= No. 212 Squadron RAF =

- Active: June 1917–April 1918; August 1918–February 1920; February–June 1940; October 1942–July 1945
- Country: United Kingdom
- Branch: Royal Air Force
- Role: Photographic reconnaissance / Maritime patrol
- Mottos: Amari ad Astra ("From the Sea to the Stars")
- Aircraft: Airco DH.4 (1918–19); Airco DH.9 (1918–20); Airco DH.9A (1918–20); Sopwith Camel (1918–20); Supermarine Spitfire C (1940); Bristol Blenheim IV (1940); Lockheed Hudson I (1940); Consolidated Catalina IB (1942–45); Consolidated Catalina V (1944–45)

Insignia
- Squadron Code: QB (April–September 1939)

No. 212 Squadron RAF is an inactive squadron of the British Royal Air Force.

== First World War ==
The squadron was first formed as No. 12 Squadron of the Royal Naval Air Service, a training unit of No. 1 Wing, founded at Hondschoote on 8 June 1917. However, unlike other RNAS units it was not absorbed into the RAF as No. 212 Squadron, and was disbanded on 1 April 1918.

On 20 August 1918 Flights 490, 557 and 558 of the former RNAS base at Great Yarmouth were formed into No. 212 Squadron RAF. Flying the DH4, DH9 and DH9A, it carried out anti-submarine patrols over the North Sea until the end of the war. In March 1919 it moved to Swingate Down near Dover, and was disbanded on 9 February 1920.

== Second World War ==
In early 1940 a detachment from the Photographic Development Unit was sent to France, and was designated No. 212 Squadron on 10 February 1940. Operating the Spitfire and Blenheim it flew strategic reconnaissance sorties over Germany until being evacuated to Britain following the fall of France. It was disbanded on 18 June.

The squadron was reformed on 22 October 1942 to operate the Catalina in the air-sea rescue and anti-submarine warfare role over the Indian Ocean, Persian Gulf, Arabian Sea, and along the coasts of India and Burma. It was based at Korangi Creek near Karachi, with detachments at Umm Rasays, Masirah, in Oman, and Calcutta in East India. It finally moved to Madras in May 1945, where it was re-numbered No. 240 Squadron on 1 July 1945.
