= Carl Degelow =

German fighter pilot during World War I

- Born: 5 January 1891; Munsterdorf, Germany
- Died: 9 November 1970 (aged 79); Hamburg, Germany
- Military career
- Allegiance: Germany
- Branch: Infantry, Air Service
- Service years: 1914 - circa 1945
- Rank: Major
- Nickname: "Charly"
- Units: Infantry Regiment 88, FAA 216, Jagdstaffel 36, Jagdstaffel 7
- Commands: Jagdstaffel 40
- Awards: Pour le Merite, Royal House Order of Hohenzollern, Iron Cross
- Other work: Luftwaffe in World War II.

Carl "Charly" Degelow (5 January 1891 – 9 November 1970) Pour le Merite, Royal House Order of Hohenzollern, Iron Cross, was a German fighter pilot during World War I. He was credited with 30 victories, and was the last person to win the military Pour le Merite.

== Life before aviation ==
Carl Degelow was born on 5 January 1891 in Münsterdorf, Schleswig-Holstein, in the Kingdom of Prussia.

In 1912–1913, before World War I broke out, Degelow worked in the United States as an industrial chemist. His specialty was the manufacture of cement, and he was known to have visited Chicago and El Paso.

He returned to Germany just before World War I erupted and enlisted in Nassauischen Infanterie-Regiment Nr 88. Degelow initially served with distinction in this infantry regiment in both France and Russia, winning both classes of the Iron Cross and earning promotion in rank from Gefreiter to Vizefeldwebel. He was also wounded in the arm while fighting in Russia. He was commissioned as a Leutnant on 31 July 1915.

== Flying service ==
- See also Aerial victory standards of World War I

Degelow transferred to the air service in 1916 and trained as a pilot. His first assignment was to Flieger-Abteilung (Artillerie): Flier Detachment (Artillery) 216 as an artillery spotter at the beginning of 1917, directing and correcting artillery fire from an Albatros C.V. On 22 May 1917, he claimed a French Caudron G.IV, but it was unconfirmed. Three days later, he shot down another Caudron; for this one he got credit.

He was reassigned to the Prussian Jagdstaffel 36 for transitional training into flying Pfalz D.III fighters in August 1917, but lasted fewer than four days. The process involved zeroing in an aircraft's machine guns on a firing range. Degelow accidentally wounded a member of the unit and was hastily reassigned on 17 August to Prussian Jagdstaffel 7 to fly a Pfalz D.III under the leadership of Leutnant Josef Jacobs.

Degelow chose to fly a Pfalz because the Albatros D.V available to him had a reputation at the time for losing its wings in a dive. He began his string of victories with Jagdstaffel 7 on an uncertain note. He filed three widely spaced consecutive victories that were unconfirmed as the enemy planes landed on the Allied side of the front lines. By German regulations, these could not be considered confirmed aerial victories.

In September, he was almost shot down by a Bristol F.2 Fighter after it hit his oil tank, which misted his flying goggles and blurred his vision. Only Jacobs' intervention saved Degelow. Degelow claimed Jacobs destroyed the attacker, although the victory is not listed on Jacobs' records.

On 25 January 1918 he finally was credited with his second victory, after four unconfirmed claims. On 23 March, while landing in a 30 kilometer per hour (19 mph) wind, he destroyed his aircraft by upsetting upon landing but was unhurt. The photo of his inverted aircraft shows he sported a running stag insignia on his plane.

His third confirmed victory did not come until 21 April 1918. He scored his fourth victory and transferred on 16 May 1918 to the Royal Saxon Jagdstaffel 40. Degelow became the squadron's commanding officer on 11 July 1918, after Helmut Dilthey was killed. During this time, he also flew a borrowed Fokker Dr.1 Triplane, though he doesn't seem to have claimed any successes with it.

He became an ace on 18 June, with the first of his two June victories. On the 25th, he took his new Fokker D.VII on a test flight, came upon a dogfight between D. VIIs of another Jasta and Sopwith Camels, and shot one of the Camels down. The D.VII remained his mount for the remainder of the war. His had the front three-quarters of the fuselage painted black; the rear quarter was white. Emblazoned on the side was a white running stag with gold antlers and hooves, its head pointed toward the propeller. The stag was in honor of the hospital where he recuperated after he was wounded in action.

In July, he scored six times. On 9 August, he was awarded the Knight's Cross with Swords of the Royal House Order of Hohenzollern. In September, he again scored six times. October saw ten victories on ten different days. The victory on the 4th was over a Canadian naval ace, Captain John Greene of No. 213 Squadron. Degelow scored once more, on 4 November, just before the end of his and Germany's war. Thus credited with 30 confirmed victories and four unconfirmed, he was the last German pilot and final German serviceman to be awarded the Blue Max, on 9 November 1918, the day the Kaiser abdicated, and two days before the end of the war. The abdication ended Imperial decrees and orders such as awards for the "Blue Max". Degelow also received the Iron Cross, 1st and 2nd class.

== Post World War I ==
Immediately postwar, Degelow helped found the Hamburger Zeitfreiwilligen Korps to battle communists in Germany. He wrote his war memoirs, With the White Stag Through Thick and Thin in 1920. They were published in English in 1979 as Germany's Last Knight of the Air by Peter Kilduff, who added some additional commentary.

Degelow remained in the reserves between World Wars I and II. During the first days of the Nazi regime, he was jailed for several days for failure to give the Nazi salute on parade. When someone recognized the Pour le Merite on his uniform, he was quickly released.

By the time World War II began, he was a Hauptmann (captain). Degelow went on to serve as a Major in the Luftwaffe during World War II.

He died in Hamburg, Germany on 9 November 1970.

== See also ==
- Degelow, Carl; Kilduff, Peter. Germany's Last Knight of the Air: The Memoirs of Major Carl Degelow. W. Kimber, 1979. ISBN 0718301463, 9780718301460.

== Bibliography ==
- Franks, Norman; Bailey, Frank W.; Guest, Russell. Above the Lines: The Aces and Fighter Units of the German Air Service, Naval Air Service and Flanders Marine Corps, 1914–1918. Grub Street, 1993. ISBN 978-0-948817-73-1.
- Norman Franks, Greg VanWyngarden. Fokker Dr I Aces of World War I. Osprey Publishing, 2001. ISBN 978-1-84176-223-4.
- Greg VanWyngarden. Pfalz Scout Aces of World War 1. Osprey Publishing, 2006. ISBN 9781841769981.
