= Kampe =

Kampe may refer to:

People with the surname

- Anja Kampe (born 1968), German opera singer
- Eva Kampe (born 1940), Australian track and field athlete
- Gordon Kampe (born 1976), German composer
- Greg Kampe (born 1955), American basketball coach
- Willi Kampe (1888–1918), German flying ace of World War I

Others

- Campe, also spelled Kampê, a Greek mythological monster
- Kampe (Glowe), a village in the German municipality of Glowe
- Kampê, a character in the Percy Jackson & the Olympians series of fantasy adventure novels
