= Robert Miles Todd =

American WWI flying ace (1897–1988)

- Todd at the POW camp where he was taken after being shot down.
- Born: 24 June 1897; Cincinnati, Ohio, US
- Died: 20 January 1988 (aged 90); La Jolla, California, US
- Military career
- Allegiance: United States
- Branch: Air Service, United States Army
- Rank: Lieutenant
- Unit: 17th Aero Squadron
- Conflicts: World War I
- Awards: Purple Heart
- Other work: Returned to service during World War II

Lieutenant Robert Miles Todd was an American World War I flying ace credited with five enemy planes destroyed.

== Early life ==
Robert Miles Todd was born in Cincinnati, Ohio, on 24 June 1897.

== World War I ==
Todd joined the United States Air Service on 6 August 1917. He was studying engineering at the University of Cincinnati; however, he graduated from the Ohio State University School of Aeronautics in October. He then underwent aviation training at Benbrook Field, Texas before moving on to Canada for further training.

Todd served with the 17th Aero Squadron in France; the American squadron was under British control. Todd destroyed four enemy airplanes and an observation balloon during August 1918. On 26 August 1918, Todd and seven squadronmates were in a dogfight with 40 Fokkers of Germany's Jagdgeschwader 3. Immediately after Todd shot down his final victim on 26 August 1918, he fell under the guns of Rudolf Klimke of Jagdstaffel 27, one of seven Camels downed that day by the Germans. Todd was wounded, but survived, and was held captive as a prisoner of war until December 1918. German soldiers rescuing him from the overturned wreckage of his plane broke his foot, and he was abused by German housewives on the way to prison.

== List of aerial victories ==
See also Aerial victory standards of World War I

No.	Date/time	Aircraft	Foe	Result	Location	Notes
1	1 August 1918 @ 0900 hours	Sopwith Camel serial number D9513	Fokker Triplane	Destroyed	Provin, France	
2	14 August 1918 @ 1130 hours	Sopwith Camel s/n D9513	Fokker D.VII	Destroyed	Southwest of Bruges, Belgium	Victory shared with Lloyd Hamilton and another pilot
3	21 August 1918 @ 1845 hours	Sopwith Camel s/n D9513	Observation balloon	Destroyed	Map reference 57C H17	Victory shared with Lloyd Hamilton
4	22 August 1918 @ 1000 hours	Sopwith Camel s/n D9513	Fokker D.VII	Destroyed	Map reference 57C H32	
5	26 August 1918 @ 1700 hours	Sopwith Camel s/n D6545	Fokker D.VII	Destroyed	Between Bapaume and Queant, France	Todd was himself shot down shortly thereafter

== Post World War I ==
After his return to the U. S., Todd once again took up engineering.

During World War II, Todd returned to military service; however, his eyesight was no longer acute enough for him to fly. He served in logistics for both the Eighth Air Force and the Ninth Air Force until 1944, commanding a 5,000 man air depot group. He also served as a commander of a staging area for gliders. He stayed on after war's end to aid in the disposal of combat material, but quit in disgust when he found that serviceable goods that could have been converted to civilian use were instead being dumped.

Todd moved to San Diego in 1952. He retired from military service as a lieutenant colonel in 1965.

His autobiographical memoirs were published in 1978, entitled Sopwith Camel Fighter Ace.

In 1981, he was one of a group of aces who returned to France for an Armistice Day celebration. In 1982, he belatedly received the Purple Heart for the wound he received on 26 August 1918.

Robert Miles Todd died of pneumonia in the Veterans Administration Hospital in La Jolla, California on 20 January 1988.

== See also ==
- List of World War I flying aces from the United States

== Bibliography ==
- Sopwith Camel Fighter Ace Robert M. Todd. AJAY Enterprises, 1978. ISBN 0-939440-04-0, ISBN 978-0-939440-04-7.
- Above the Trenches: A Complete Record of the Fighter Aces and Units of the British Empire Air Forces 1915–1920. Christopher F. Shores, Norman L. R. Franks, Russell Guest. Grub Street, 1990. ISBN 0-948817-19-4, ISBN 978-0-948817-19-9.
- Over the Front: A Complete Record of the Fighter Aces and Units of the United States and French Air Services, 1914–1918 Norman L. R. Franks, Frank W. Bailey. Grub Street, 1992. ISBN 0-948817-54-2, ISBN 978-0-948817-54-0.
