= Jagdstaffel 40 =

Jasta 40
- Active: 1917–1918
- Country: German Empire
- Branch: Luftstreitkräfte
- Type: Fighter squadron
- Engagements: World War I

Royal Saxon Jagdstaffel 40, commonly abbreviated to Jasta 40, was a "hunting group" (i.e., fighter squadron) of the Luftstreitkräfte, the air arm of the Imperial German Army during World War I. The unit would score over 54 aerial victories during the war, including three observation balloons downed. The squadron's victories came at the expense of five killed in action, one killed in a flying accident, and six wounded in action.

== History ==
Jasta 40 was founded on 30 June 1917 at Fliegerersatz-Abteilung ("Replacement Detachment") 6, Grossenhain, Germany. It became operational on 15 August 1917. It scored its first air-to-air victory on 25 September 1917. It would serve until war's end.

== Commanding officers (Staffelführer) ==
- Oberleutnant Eilers
- Helmut Dilthey: Early April 1918
- Carl Degelow: circa 9 July 1918

== Duty stations ==
- Möntingen/Metz: 15 August 1917
- Mars-la-Tour: 14 September 1917
- Masny: 15 March 1918
- Roubaix
- Meuines
- Wynghene
- Gontrode

== Notable personnel ==
- Carl Degelow
- Helmut Dilthey
- Willi Rosenstein
- Hermann Gilly
- Hans Jeschonnek

== Operations ==
Jasta 40 began its combat operations on 15 August 1917, in support of Armee-Abteilung A. However, on 14 September 1917, it moved to support of Armee-Abteilung C. On 15 March 1918, it shifted again, to support 17 Armee. The following month, it was assigned to the 4 Armee Front, supporting this formation from various French aerodromes until the Armistice.
