= Willy Kahle =

German flying ace

- Born: 13 April 1892; Tarff, Sans, German Empire
- Died: Unknown
- Military career
- Allegiance: Germany
- Branch: Cavalry; aviation
- Service years: 1911–1918
- Rank: Feldwebel
- Units: Hussar Regiment No. 5 of the German Imperial Army; Royal Prussian Jagdstaffel 27 of the Luftstreitkräfte
- Awards: Iron Cross

Feldwebel Willy Kahle was a World War I flying ace credited with six aerial victories. This feat came at the end of seven years of service to his nation.

== Early life ==
Willy Kahle was born in Tarff, Sans, Germany on 13 April 1892. He became a professional motorcyclist in his teens, before volunteering for Hussar Regiment No. 5 of the Imperial German Army in 1911.

== Service in World War I ==
He began pilot's training at Fliegerersatz-Abteilung 8 (Replacement Detachment 8) at Grossenhain, Kingdom of Saxony on 18 July 1917. Post graduation, he piloted two-seater reconnaissance airplanes. After this assignment, he returned for further training at Jastaschule II (Fighter School 2), Nivelles, Belgium. His subsequent assignment was to Jasta 27 as an Unteroffizier, on 29 July 1918. His first aerial victory did not come until 2 September; his sixth and final victory was on 4 November 1918, a week before the Armistice.

At some point, Kahle was awarded at least one class of the Iron Cross. In the latter days of the war, he was promoted to Feldwebel.

== Postwar life ==
While it is highly likely Willy Kahle survived the war, there is no further information about his subsequent life.
