= Hermann Gilly =

- Born: 16 September 1894; Donaueschingen, Grand Duchy of Baden
- Died: 23 August 1944; Hamburg, Nazi Germany
- Military career
- Allegiance: German Empire
- Branch: Aviation
- Service years: 1914–1919; World War II
- Rank: Major
- Units: Flieger-Abteilung (Artillerie) 204; Jagdstaffel 40; Jagdstaffel 29
- Awards: Austro-Hungarian Military Merit Cross; Iron Cross Second and First Class; Saxon Order of Albert
- Other work: Served in Luftwaffe in World War II

Major Hermann Gilly (16 September 1894 – 23 August 1944) was a World War I flying ace credited with seven aerial victories. He came to aviation service after two years infantry combat service, which saw him promoted to Leutnant in March 1916 while in Russia. He would not begin his flying career until November 1916. He served as an artillery cooperation pilot in Italy from November 1917 to March 1918. He was reassigned to a fighter unit, Jagdstaffel 40, effective 14 April 1918. Gilly scored seven aerial victories from 24 May 1918 through war's end. He was discharged on 22 January 1919.

Hermann Gilly also served as a Major in the Luftwaffe in World War II.

== Early life and infantry service ==
Hermann Gilly was born in Donaueschingen on 16 September 1894, the son of Josef Gilly and Antonie Wern. He was working in a bank when World War I began. He joined Infantry Regiment Nr. 168 in October 1914. He served much of his war as an infantryman. He was commissioned a Leutnant in March 1916, while serving in Russia. In November 1916, he transferred to the Luftstreitkräfte.

== Aerial service ==
Gilly graduated from pilot training, then flew with Fliegerersatz-Abteilung–(Replacement Detachment) 3–while awaiting orders to combat duty. In November 1917, he was posted to Flieger-Abteilung (Artillerie) 204–(Flier Detachment (Artillery) 204)–near the Piave River in Italy. His unit's duties were artillery direction and reconnaissance. Gilly flew his first combat sortie on 17 November 1917 over Spresiano; his rear seat aerial observer somehow went overboard at 2,500 meters altitude.

Gilly was returned to France and assigned to Jagdstaffel 40–(Fighter Squadron 40)–on 14 April 1918. He spent a brief interlude with Jagdstaffel 29, was wounded, and returned to Jasta 40. He would score seven aerial victories with them between 24 June 1918 and war's end.

== Post World War I ==
Hermann Gilly demobilized from military service on 22 January 1919. He would return to his nation's military during World War II, serving as a Major in the Luftwaffe.

He died in Hamburg in 1944 and was survived by his wife, Marga Johanne Antonie Gilly née Schütz.

== Honors and awards ==
- Iron Cross Second and First Class
- Kingdom of Saxony's Knight's Cross Second Class with Swords of the Order of Albert
- Austro-Hungarian Empire's Military Merit Cross
