= Willi Rosenstein =

Willy Rosenstein
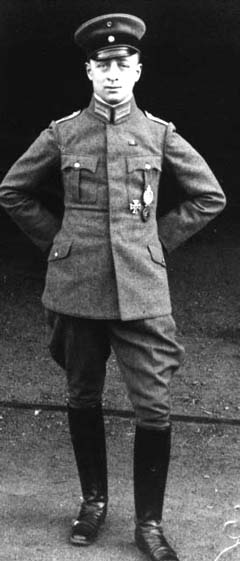
- Born: 28 January 1892; Stuttgart, Kingdom of Württemberg, German Empire
- Died: 23 May 1949 (aged 57); Rustenburg, Union of South Africa
- Military career
- Allegiance: Germany; South Africa
- Branch: Luftstreitkräfte
- Service years: 1912-ca 1918
- Rank: Leutnant
- Units: Flieger-Abteilung (Flier Detachment) 19; Jagdstaffel 27 (Fighter Squadron 27); Jagdstaffel 27 (Fighter Squadron 27), Kampfeinsitzerstaffel 1a (Combat Single-Seater Squadron 1a)
- Awards: Both classes of the Iron Cross; Knight's Cross with Swords of the Order of the Zahringer Lion

Willy Rosenstein (28 January 1892 – 23 May 1949), Iron Cross, was a German flying ace in World War I, credited with 9 victories.

== Background ==
Willy Rosenstein was born on 28 January 1892 in Stuttgart, Germany. Rosenstein had an early interest in aviation, gaining pilot's license No. 170 on 14 March 1912. The record of his licensure records his profession as "flight instructor"; this means he was a self-taught pilot from before the start of pilot licensing. Having gained his license, he set up shop as a flight instructor at Johannisthal Air Field in Berlin in 1913.

== Involvement in World War 1 ==
Rosenstein volunteered for military service, joining the Imperial German Army's 95th Infantry Regiment. He quickly transferred to the Die Fliegertruppen, and was forwarded to aviation training at Gotha on 24 August 1914. While training at Fliegerersatz-Abteilung (Replacement Detachment) 5, he was promoted twice; the latter promotion, to Vizefeldwebel came on 24 November 1914. From there, he was posted to Flieger-Abteilung (Flier Detachment) 19 on 6 March 1915. On 29 March, he was awarded the Iron Cross Second Class. His native Kingdom of Württemberg awarded him its Silver Military Service Medal on 21 August 1915. His unit at this stage was still FA 19, based at Porcher. From there, Rosenstein travelled to the Fokker factory at Schwerin to collect the unit's first Fokker Eindecker. He undertook twenty-five hours of testing and completed twenty-three combat flights on the type during September and October 1915.

On 17 February 1916, Rosenstein was commissioned as a Leutnant. On 28 April 1916, he was wounded in action over the Battle of Verdun. He was then awarded the Iron Cross First Class, having flown 180 combat sorties to date. Upon recovery, he reported to 3rd Army as a Fokker pilot. He became one of the founding members of one of Germany's brand-new fighter squadrons, Jagdstaffel 9, founded 23 September 1916.

He moved on to Jagdstaffel 27 on 15 February 1917. While there, he frequently flew wingman to Hermann Göring. However, it would not be until 21 September that he scored his first aerial victory, when he shot down an Airco DH.4 over Zonnebeke while on a morning patrol. Five days later, his victim was a Sopwith Camel. Then, in an unusual twist, he was sent for aerial observer's training. On 8 January 1918, he was posted to Kampfeinsitzerstaffel (Combat Single-seater Squadron) 1a. He was passed on to serve in Kampfeinsitzerstaffel (Combat Single-seater Squadron) 1b on 4 April 1918. Flying with them, he scored his third aerial victory on 26 June, when he downed another DH.4.

On 2 July 1918, he received his final war posting, to Jagdstaffel 40. He promptly shot down a Royal Aircraft Factory SE.5a on 14 July. On 28 September, he received his native kingdom's award of the Knight's Cross 2nd Class with Swords of the Order of the Zahringer Lion. The following day, he began a run of five victories that took him through 27 October 1918. At about this time, Rosenstein was nominated for the House Order of Hohenzollern. The war ended without Rosenstein scoring a ninth victory or receiving the Hohenzollern.

== Later life ==
Willy Rosenstein became a glider pilot sportsman postwar. In 1936, he emigrated to the Union of South Africa. This is probably linked to the Nazi antipathy toward Judaism, as Rosenstein was Jewish.

Rosenstein took to farming, though he kept his interest in aviation. His son Ernest became a fighter pilot for the South African Air Force during World War II, being killed in action over Italy on 2 April 1945.

Willy Rosenstein survived both his son and the war. He was killed on 23 May 1949 in a midair collision with a student pilot over his farm in Rustenburg, South Africa.
