= Boeschepe =

- Commune
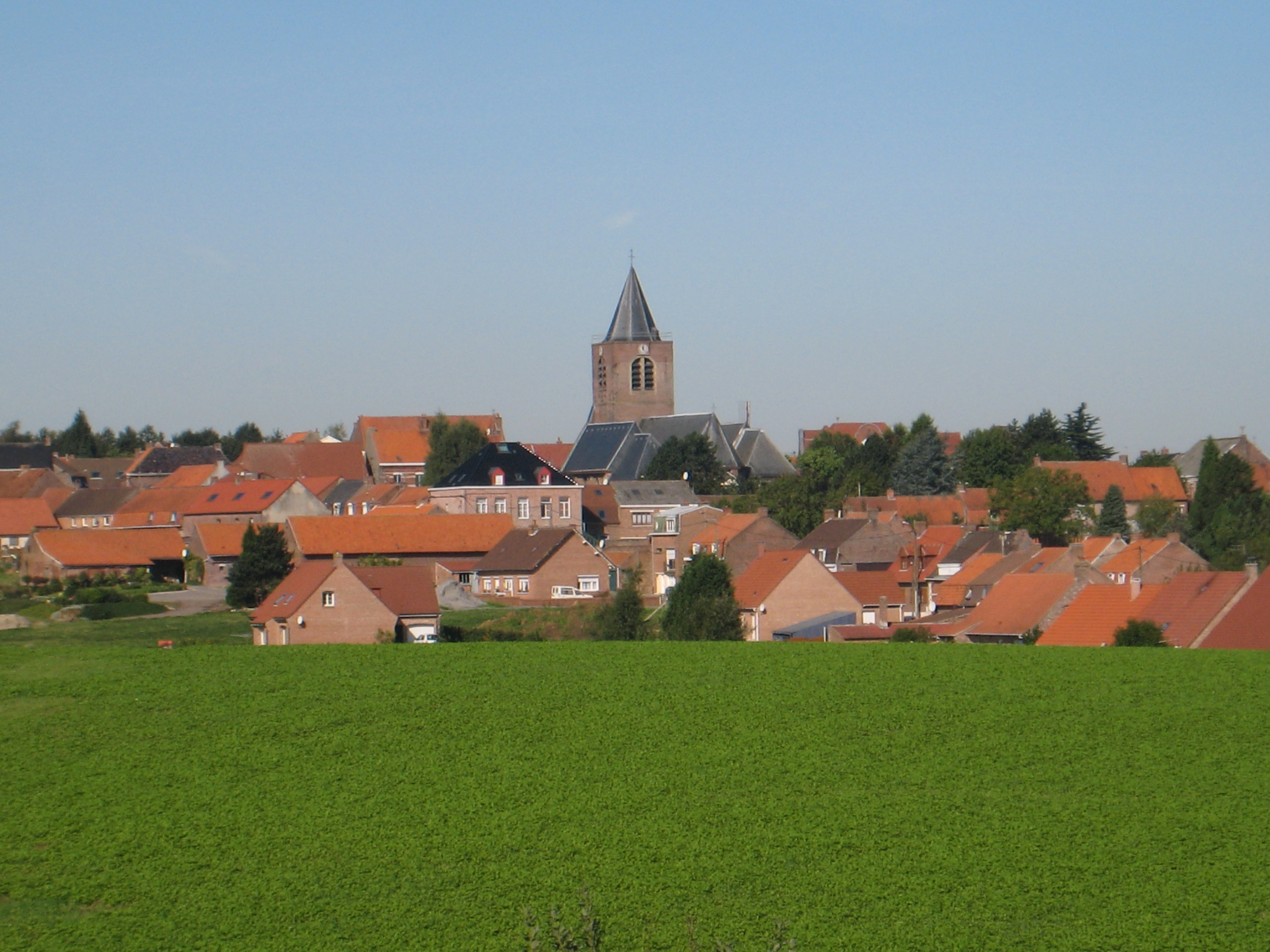
- A general view of Boeschepe

- Coat of arms
- Location of Boeschepe
- Location within France Location within Hauts-de-France
- Coordinates: 50°48′01″N 2°41′31″E
- Country: France
- Region: Hauts-de-France
- Department: Nord
- Arrondissement: Dunkerque
- Canton: Bailleul
- Intercommunality: CA Cœur de Flandre

Government
  - Mayor (2020–2026): Luc Van Inghelandt
- Area^{1}: 13.59 km^{2} (5.25 sq mi)
- Elevation: 74 m (243 ft)
- Highest elevation: 153 m (502 ft)
- Lowest elevation: 28 m (92 ft)
- Population (2023): 2,244
  - Density: 165.1/km^{2} (427.7/sq mi)
- Time zone: UTC+01:00 (CET)
  - Summer (DST): UTC+02:00 (CEST)
- INSEE/Postal code: 59086 /59299
- ^{1} French Land Register data, which excludes lakes, ponds, glaciers > 1 km^{2} (0.386 sq mi or 247 acres) and river estuaries.

Boeschepe (French pronunciation: [bɔskɛp]) is a commune in the Nord department in northern France, next to the Belgian border.

== Population ==
Historical population

Year	Pop.	±% p.a.
1793	1,758	—
1821	1,862	+0.21%
1846	1,953	+0.19%
1872	2,201	+0.46%
1901	2,184	−0.03%
1926	2,093	−0.17%
1946	2,111	+0.04%
1962	2,085	−0.08%
1968	2,015	−0.57%

Year	Pop.	±% p.a.
1975	1,883	−0.96%
1982	1,747	−1.07%
1990	1,906	+1.09%
1999	2,012	+0.60%
2007	2,201	+1.13%
2012	2,188	−0.12%
2017	2,183	−0.05%
2023	2,244	+0.46%

Source: EHESS and INSEE (1968-2023)

== Heraldry ==
Arms of Boeschepe	The arms of Boeschepe are blazoned : Or, 3 chevrons sable. (Bersillies, Boeschepe, Boussières-sur-Sambre, Colleret, Cousolre, Flaumont-Waudrechies, Hautmont, Limont-Fontaine, Lompret, Masny, Neuville-en-Avesnois and Saint-Rémy-du-Nord use the same arms.)

== See also ==
- Communes of the Nord department
