= Boussières-sur-Sambre =

- Commune
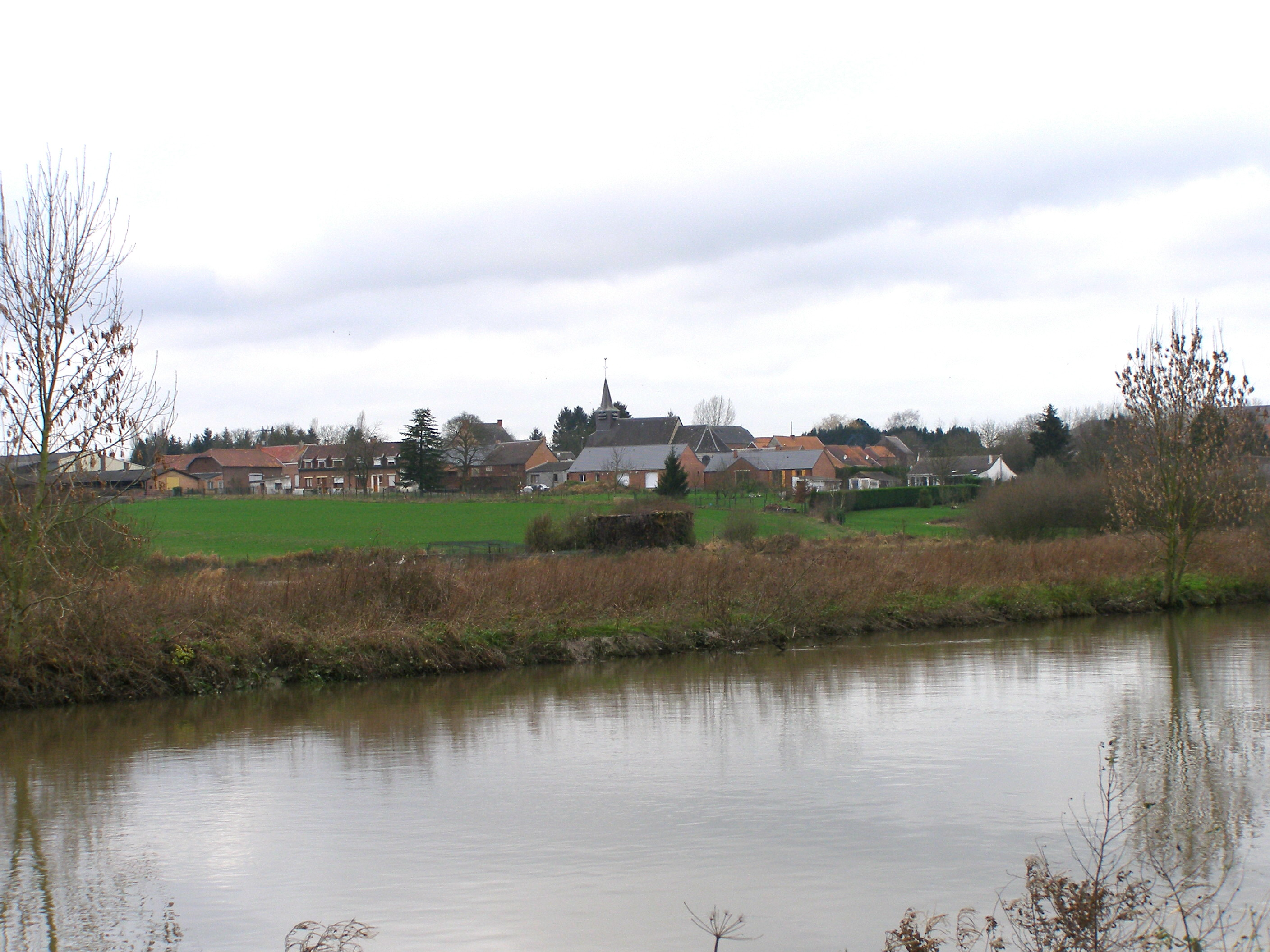
- A general view of Boussières-sur-Sambre

- Coat of arms
- Location of Boussières-sur-Sambre
- Location within France Location within Hauts-de-France
- Coordinates: 50°14′27″N 3°52′57″E
- Country: France
- Region: Hauts-de-France
- Department: Nord
- Arrondissement: Avesnes-sur-Helpe
- Canton: Aulnoye-Aymeries
- Intercommunality: CA Maubeuge Val de Sambre

Government
  - Mayor (2020–2026): Claude Dupont
- Area^{1}: 3.28 km^{2} (1.27 sq mi)
- Elevation: 135 m (443 ft)
- Highest elevation: 164 m (538 ft)
- Lowest elevation: 122 m (400 ft)
- Population (2023): 522
  - Density: 159/km^{2} (412/sq mi)
- Time zone: UTC+01:00 (CET)
  - Summer (DST): UTC+02:00 (CEST)
- INSEE/Postal code: 59103 /59330
- ^{1} French Land Register data, which excludes lakes, ponds, glaciers > 1 km^{2} (0.386 sq mi or 247 acres) and river estuaries.

Boussières-sur-Sambre (French pronunciation: [busjɛʁ syʁ sɑ̃bʁ], lit. 'Boussières on Sambre') is a commune in the Nord department in northern France.

== Population ==
Historical population
Year	Pop.	±% p.a.
1968	428	—
1975	412	−0.54%
1982	449	+1.24%
1990	423	−0.74%
1999	429	+0.16%
2007	502	+1.98%
2012	528	+1.02%
2017	524	−0.15%
2023	522	−0.06%
Source: INSEE

== Heraldry ==
Arms of Boussières-sur-Sambre	The arms of Boussières-sur-Sambre are blazoned : Or, 3 chevrons sable. (Bersillies, Boeschepe, Boussières-sur-Sambre, Colleret, Cousolre, Flaumont-Waudrechies, Hautmont, Limont-Fontaine, Lompret, Masny, Neuville-en-Avesnois and Saint-Rémy-du-Nord use the same arms.)

== See also ==
- Communes of the Nord department
