= Saint-Remy-du-Nord =

- Commune
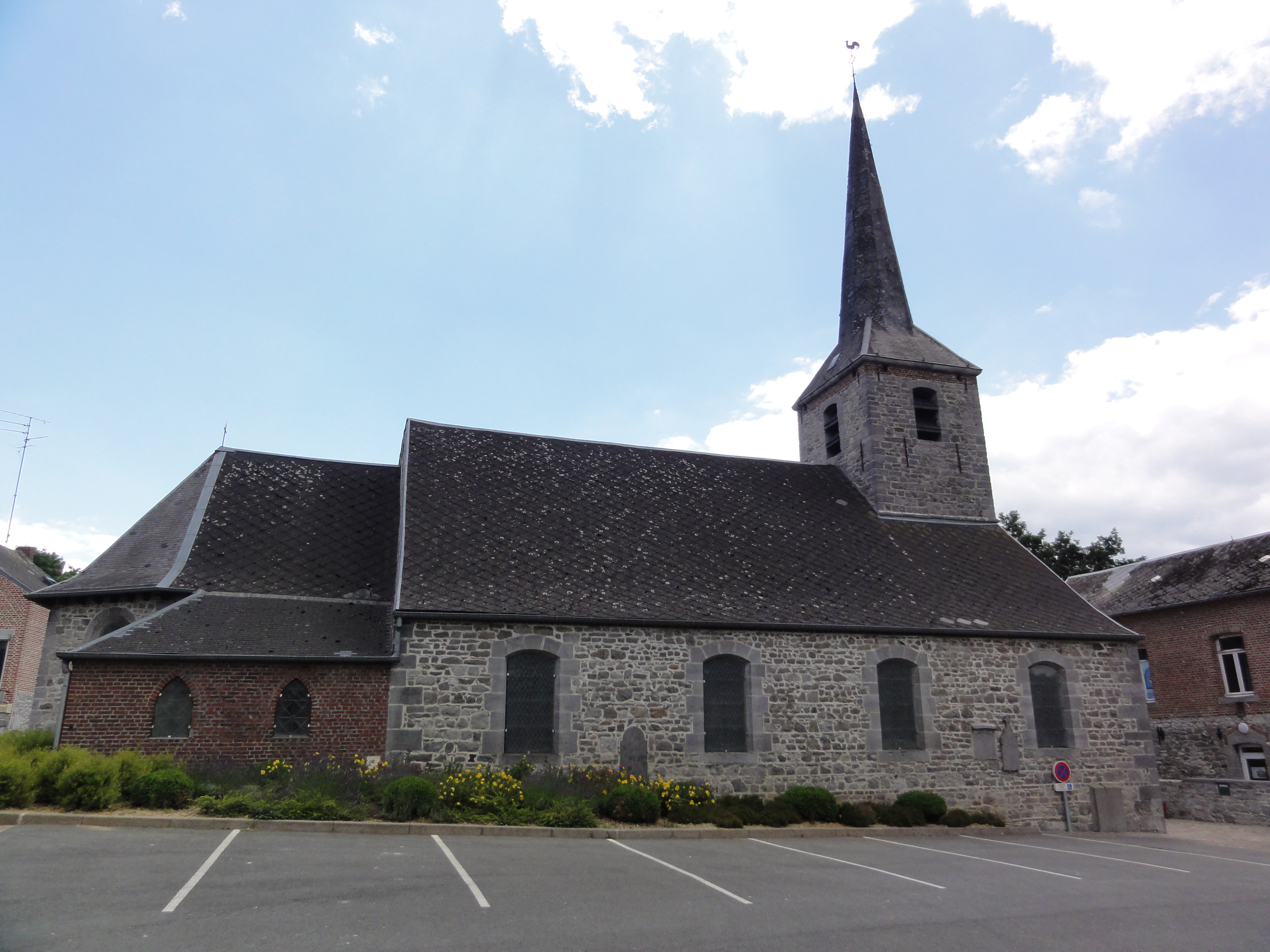
- The church in Saint-Remy-du-Nord

- Coat of arms
- Location of Saint-Remy-du-Nord
- Location within France Location within Hauts-de-France
- Coordinates: 50°13′59″N 3°54′23″E
- Country: France
- Region: Hauts-de-France
- Department: Nord
- Arrondissement: Avesnes-sur-Helpe
- Canton: Avesnes-sur-Helpe
- Intercommunality: CA Maubeuge Val de Sambre

Government
  - Mayor (2020–2026): Lucien Serpillon
- Area^{1}: 5.91 km^{2} (2.28 sq mi)
- Elevation: 180 m (590 ft)
- Highest elevation: 174 m (571 ft)
- Lowest elevation: 122 m (400 ft)
- Population (2023): 1,054
  - Density: 178/km^{2} (462/sq mi)
- Time zone: UTC+01:00 (CET)
  - Summer (DST): UTC+02:00 (CEST)
- INSEE/Postal code: 59543 /59330
- ^{1} French Land Register data, which excludes lakes, ponds, glaciers > 1 km^{2} (0.386 sq mi or 247 acres) and river estuaries.

Saint-Remy-du-Nord is a commune in the Nord department in northern France.

== Heraldry ==
Arms of Saint-Remy-du-Nord	The arms of Saint-Remy-du-Nord are blazoned : Or, 3 chevrons sable. (Bersillies, Boeschepe, Boussières-sur-Sambre, Colleret, Cousolre, Flaumont-Waudrechies, Hautmont, Limont-Fontaine, Lompret, Masny, Neuville-en-Avesnois and Saint-Rémy-du-Nord use the same arms.)

== See also ==
- Communes of the Nord department
