= Colleret =

- Commune
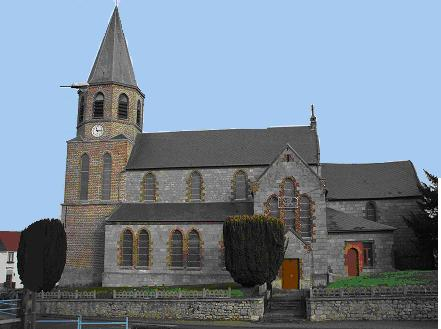
- The church in Colleret

- Coat of arms
- Location of Colleret
- Location within France Location within Hauts-de-France
- Coordinates: 50°15′26″N 4°04′36″E
- Country: France
- Region: Hauts-de-France
- Department: Nord
- Arrondissement: Avesnes-sur-Helpe
- Canton: Fourmies
- Intercommunality: CA Maubeuge Val de Sambre

Government
  - Mayor (2024–2026): Claude Menissez
- Area^{1}: 18.79 km^{2} (7.25 sq mi)
- Elevation: 181 m (594 ft)
- Highest elevation: 214 m (702 ft)
- Lowest elevation: 138 m (453 ft)
- Population (2023): 1,541
  - Density: 82.01/km^{2} (212.4/sq mi)
- Time zone: UTC+01:00 (CET)
  - Summer (DST): UTC+02:00 (CEST)
- INSEE/Postal code: 59151 /59680
- ^{1} French Land Register data, which excludes lakes, ponds, glaciers > 1 km^{2} (0.386 sq mi or 247 acres) and river estuaries.

Colleret (French pronunciation: [kɔlʁɛ]) is a commune of the Nord department in northern France.

== Heraldry ==
| Arms of Colleret | The arms of Colleret are blazoned : Or, 3 chevrons sable. (Bersillies, Boeschepe, Boussières-sur-Sambre, Colleret, Cousolre, Flaumont-Waudrechies, Hautmont, Limont-Fontaine, Lompret, Masny, Neuville-en-Avesnois and Saint-Rémy-du-Nord use the same arms.) |

== See also ==
- Communes of the Nord department
