= Hautmont =

- Commune
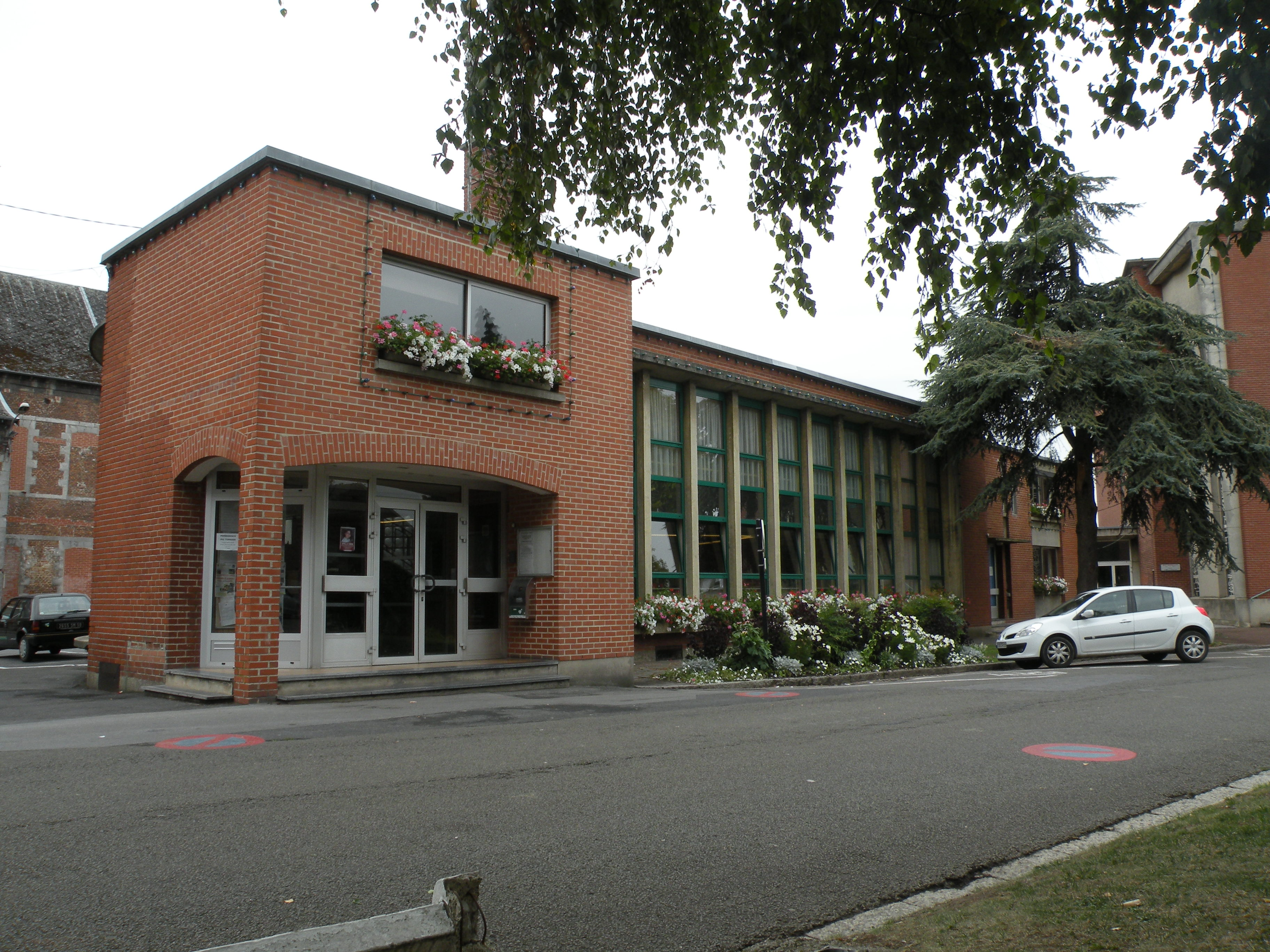
- The town hall in Hautmont

- Coat of arms
- Location of Hautmont
- Location within France Location within Hauts-de-France
- Coordinates: 50°14′55″N 3°55′31″E
- Country: France
- Region: Hauts-de-France
- Department: Nord
- Arrondissement: Avesnes-sur-Helpe
- Canton: Avesnes-sur-Helpe
- Intercommunality: Maubeuge Val de Sambre

Government
  - Mayor (2020–2026): Stéphane Wilmotte
- Area^{1}: 12.27 km^{2} (4.74 sq mi)
- Elevation: 132 m (433 ft)
- Highest elevation: 184 m (604 ft)
- Lowest elevation: 123 m (404 ft)
- Population (2023): 14,152
  - Density: 1,153/km^{2} (2,987/sq mi)
- Time zone: UTC+01:00 (CET)
  - Summer (DST): UTC+02:00 (CEST)
- INSEE/Postal code: 59291 /59330
- ^{1} French Land Register data, which excludes lakes, ponds, glaciers > 1 km^{2} (0.386 sq mi or 247 acres) and river estuaries.

Hautmont (French pronunciation: [omɔ̃]) is a commune in the Nord department in northern France.

It is 5 km (3 mi) southwest of the centre of Maubeuge, and has 14,500 residents.

On 3 August 2008 a narrow but strong F4 tornado swept through the town, as well as Maubeuge, Neuf-Mesnil and Boussières-sur-Sambre damaging hundreds of buildings, forty of which collapsed. The tornado killed three people and injured seventeen others. The tornado was part of an outbreak that produced nine other tornadoes.

== Population ==
Historical population
Year	Pop.	±% p.a.
1968	17,870	—
1975	19,175	+1.01%
1982	18,461	−0.54%
1990	17,475	−0.68%
1999	16,029	−0.96%
2007	15,015	−0.81%
2012	14,115	−1.23%
2017	14,574	+0.64%
2023	14,152	−0.49%
Source: INSEE

== Heraldry ==
Arms of Hautmont	The arms of Hautmont are blazoned: Or, 3 chevrons sable. (Bersillies, Boeschepe, Boussières-sur-Sambre, Colleret, Cousolre, Flaumont-Waudrechies, Hautmont, Limont-Fontaine, Lompret, Masny, Neuville-en-Avesnois and Saint-Rémy-du-Nord use the same arms.)

== International relations ==
Hautmont is twinned with Kalisz in Poland (since 1958).

== See also ==
- Communes of the Nord department
