= Limont-Fontaine =

- Commune
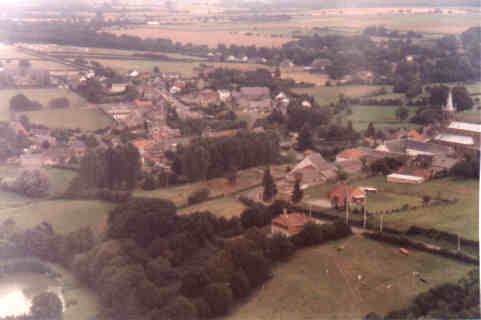
- An aerial view of Limont-Fontaine

- Coat of arms
- Location of Limont-Fontaine
- Location within France Location within Hauts-de-France
- Coordinates: 50°12′31″N 3°55′23″E
- Country: France
- Region: Hauts-de-France
- Department: Nord
- Arrondissement: Avesnes-sur-Helpe
- Canton: Avesnes-sur-Helpe
- Intercommunality: CA Maubeuge Val de Sambre

Government
  - Mayor (2020–2026): Alexandre Paree
- Area^{1}: 6.78 km^{2} (2.62 sq mi)
- Elevation: 120 m (390 ft)
- Highest elevation: 184 m (604 ft)
- Lowest elevation: 137 m (449 ft)
- Population (2023): 525
  - Density: 77.4/km^{2} (201/sq mi)
- Time zone: UTC+01:00 (CET)
  - Summer (DST): UTC+02:00 (CEST)
- INSEE/Postal code: 59351 /59330
- ^{1} French Land Register data, which excludes lakes, ponds, glaciers > 1 km^{2} (0.386 sq mi or 247 acres) and river estuaries.

Limont-Fontaine (French pronunciation: [limɔ̃ fɔ̃tɛn]) is a commune in the Nord department in northern France.

== Heraldry ==
Arms of Limont-Fontaine	The arms of Limont-Fontaineare blazoned : Or, 3 chevrons sable. (Bersillies, Boeschepe, Boussières-sur-Sambre, Colleret, Cousolre, Flaumont-Waudrechies, Hautmont, Limont-Fontaine, Lompret, Masny, Neuville-en-Avesnois and Saint-Rémy-du-Nord use the same arms.)

== See also ==
- Communes of the Nord department
