= Hans von Keudell =

German flying ace

- Born: 5 April 1892
- Died: 15 February 1917 (aged 24) near Vlamertinge, Belgium
- Burial place: Ferme Olivier British Military Cemetery
- Military career
- Allegiance: German Empire
- Branch: Cavalry; Imperial German Air Service
- Rank: Lieutenant
- Unit: Jasta 1
- Commands: Jasta 27
- Awards: Royal House Order of Hohenzollern

Lieutenant Hans von Keudell (5 April 1892 – 15 February 1917) was a World War I flying ace credited with twelve aerial victories.

== Early life and service ==
Keudell was educated in Berlin. In 1904, he joined the cadets at Bensberg. In 1911, he joined the Uhlans. He began World War I with the Uhlans, and went into combat with them in both France and Poland. He was commissioned by April 1915, transferred to aviation and began training on 7 June. On 13 December, he was posted to fly bombing missions, objectives Verdun, Toul, and Dunkirk, for Brieftauben Abteilung Ostende.

== Service as a fighter pilot ==
By early summer of 1916, Keudell was training as a fighter pilot. On 4 August, he joined KEK B under the command of Hans Bethge. From there, on 22 August, Keudell became a founding member of Jagdstaffel 1, destined to fly successively a Fokker D.I, a Halberstadt D.II and an Albatros D.III for them. On 31 August 1916, he shot down a Martinsyde Elephant for his first win. He then scored steadily through the rest of the year, reaching ten on 22 November.

On 1 January 1917, Keudell was awarded the Knight's Cross with Swords of the Royal House Order of Hohenzollern. He shot down his eleventh victim on 24 January 1917. On 5 February, he was appointed to raise and command Jagdstaffel 27. He then scored the brand new jasta's first victory on 15 February, only to be in turn killed in action flying Albatros D III #2017/17 by Lt. Stuart Harvey Pratt, flying a Nieuport two-seater of No. 46 Squadron RFC. Keudell's Albatros landed behind British lines and was salvaged by the Royal Flying Corps to become an item in their fleet of captured aircraft.
