= Neuville-en-Avesnois =

- Commune
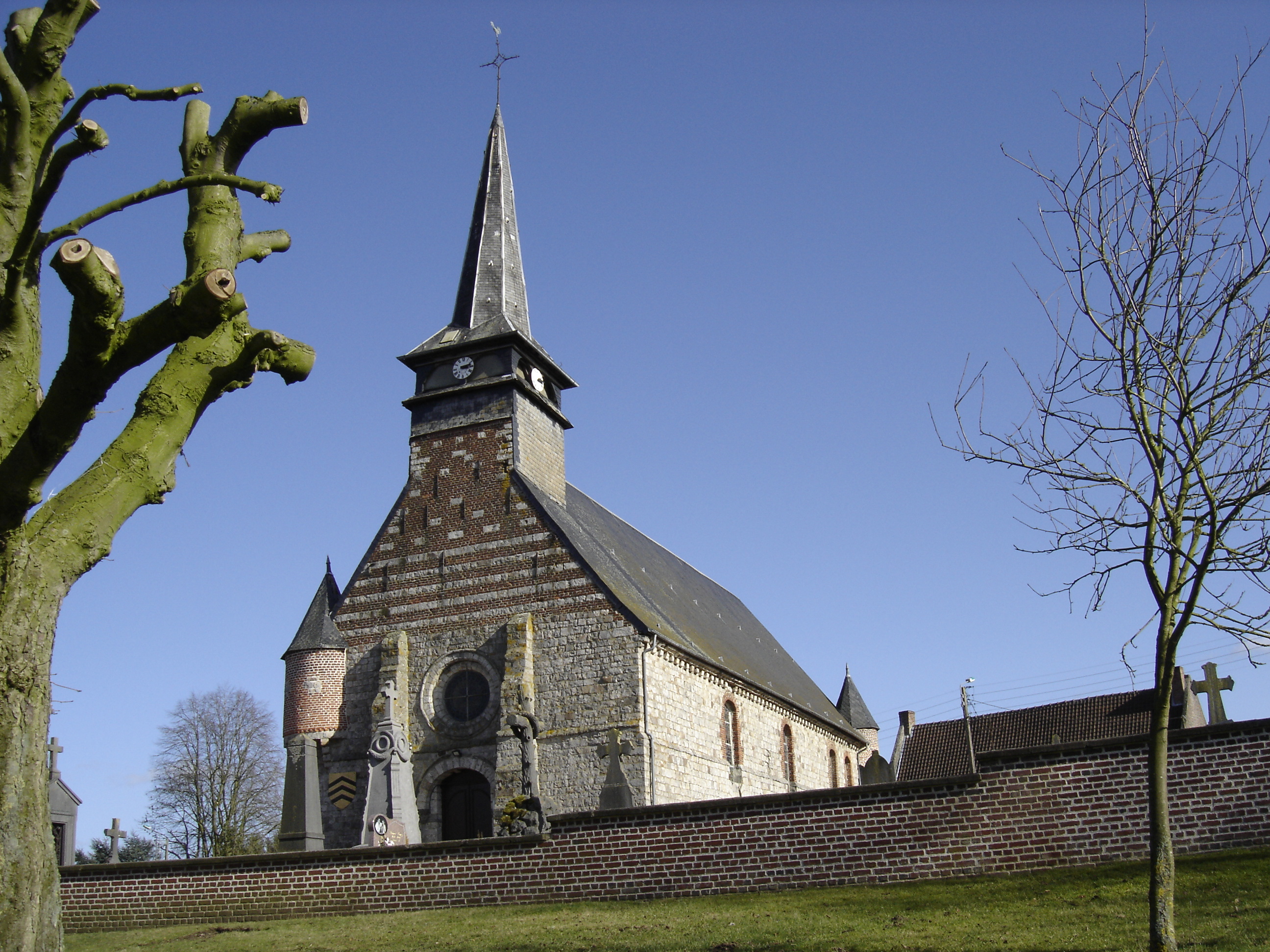
- The church in Neuville-en-Avesnois

- Coat of arms
- Location of Neuville-en-Avesnois
- Location within France Location within Hauts-de-France
- Coordinates: 50°11′51″N 3°34′52″E
- Country: France
- Region: Hauts-de-France
- Department: Nord
- Arrondissement: Avesnes-sur-Helpe
- Canton: Avesnes-sur-Helpe
- Intercommunality: CC Pays de Mormal

Government
  - Mayor (2020–2026): François Ronchin
- Area^{1}: 3.17 km^{2} (1.22 sq mi)
- Elevation: 115 m (377 ft)
- Highest elevation: 134 m (440 ft)
- Lowest elevation: 87 m (285 ft)
- Population (2023): 298
  - Density: 94.0/km^{2} (243/sq mi)
- Time zone: UTC+01:00 (CET)
  - Summer (DST): UTC+02:00 (CEST)
- INSEE/Postal code: 59425 /59218
- ^{1} French Land Register data, which excludes lakes, ponds, glaciers > 1 km^{2} (0.386 sq mi or 247 acres) and river estuaries.

Neuville-en-Avesnois is a commune in the Nord department in northern France.

== Heraldry ==
Arms of Neuville-en-Avesnois	The arms of Neuville-en-Avesnois are blazoned : Or, 3 chevrons sable. (Bersillies, Boeschepe, Boussières-sur-Sambre, Colleret, Cousolre, Flaumont-Waudrechies, Hautmont, Limont-Fontaine, Lompret, Masny, Neuville-en-Avesnois and Saint-Rémy-du-Nord use the same arms.)

== See also ==
- Communes of the Nord department
