= Wilhelm Neuenhofen =

German aviator (1897–1936)

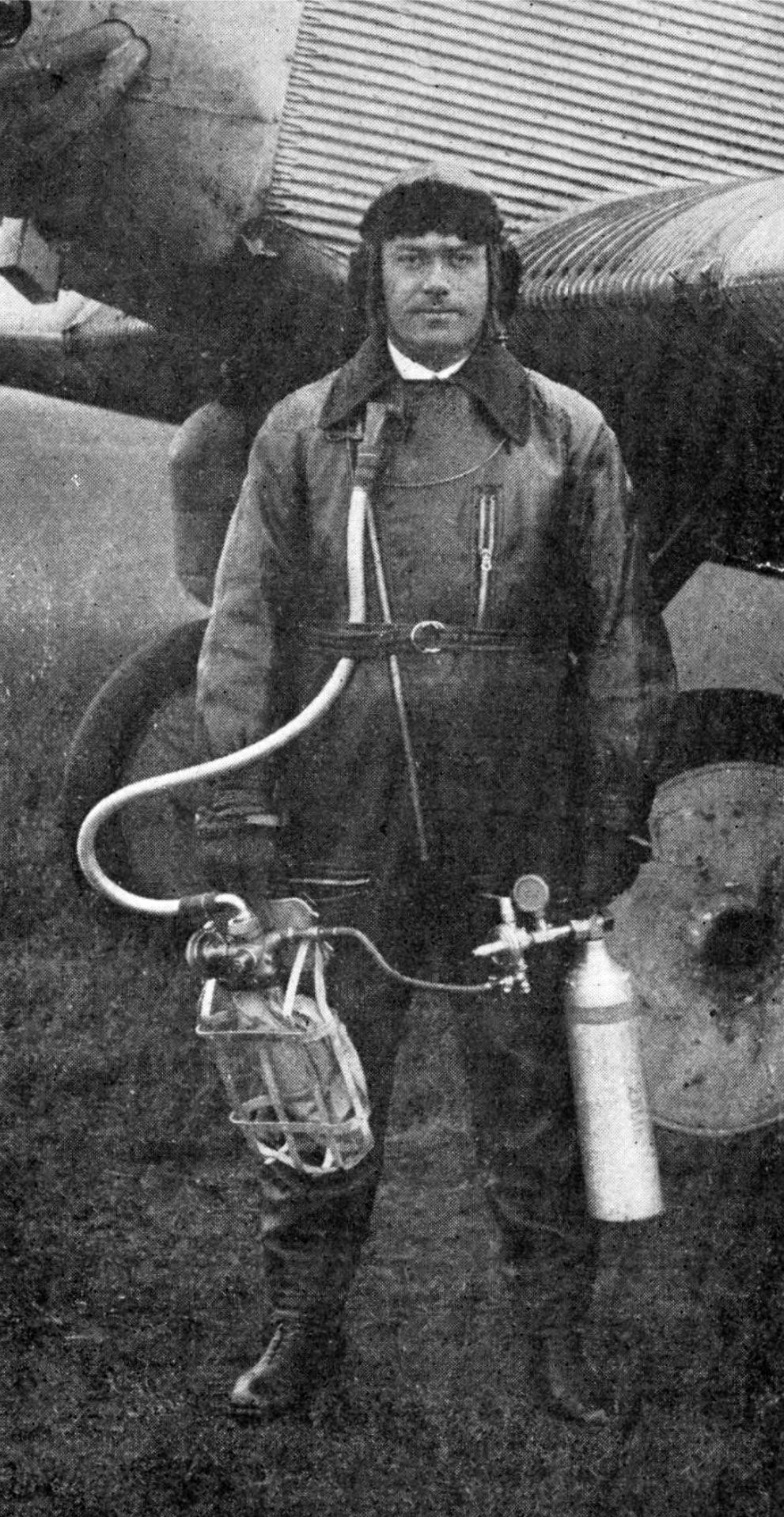
- Neuenhofen in his flight suit that he used to set the world altitude record on May 26, 1929
- Born: 24 April 1897; Munchen-Gladbach, Germany
- Died: 24 January 1936 (aged 38); Dessau, Germany
- Military career
- Allegiance: Germany
- Branch: Aviation
- Rank: Leutnant
- Nickname: Willy
- Unit: FA 215, Jasta 27

Wilhelm "Willy" Neuenhofen (24 April 1897 – 24 January 1936) was a German pilot. His career as a pilot began with the German military in the First World War, where he became a Flying Ace, obtaining 15 air victories.

On 26 May 1929 Neuenhofen set a world altitude record of 12,739 m (41,795 ft) flying a Junkers W 34 be/b3e

He was killed in 1936 whilst on a test flight in a Junkers Ju 87.
