= Bersillies =

- Commune
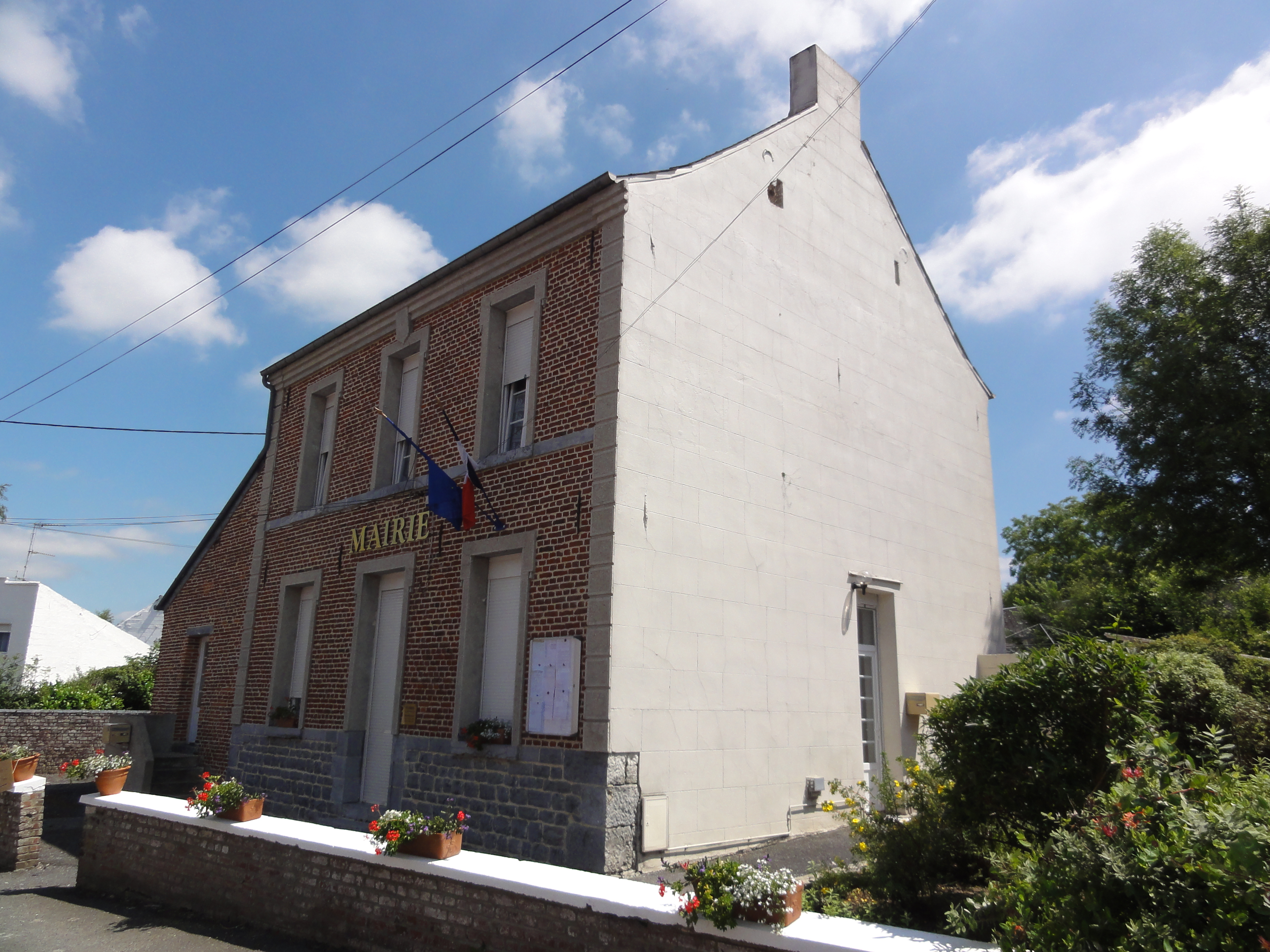
- Town hall

- Coat of arms
- Location of Bersillies
- Location within France Location within Hauts-de-France
- Coordinates: 50°19′18″N 4°00′20″E
- Country: France
- Region: Hauts-de-France
- Department: Nord
- Arrondissement: Avesnes-sur-Helpe
- Canton: Maubeuge
- Intercommunality: CA Maubeuge Val de Sambre

Government
  - Mayor (2020–2026): Marie-Paule Rousselle
- Area^{1}: 2.83 km^{2} (1.09 sq mi)
- Elevation: 130 m (430 ft)
- Highest elevation: 154 m (505 ft)
- Lowest elevation: 120 m (390 ft)
- Population (2023): 237
  - Density: 83.7/km^{2} (217/sq mi)
- Time zone: UTC+01:00 (CET)
  - Summer (DST): UTC+02:00 (CEST)
- INSEE/Postal code: 59072 /59600
- ^{1} French Land Register data, which excludes lakes, ponds, glaciers > 1 km^{2} (0.386 sq mi or 247 acres) and river estuaries.

Bersillies is a commune in the Nord department in northern France.

== Population ==
Historical population
Year	Pop.	±% p.a.
1968	173	—
1975	193	+1.58%
1982	246	+3.53%
1990	272	+1.26%
1999	275	+0.12%
2007	261	−0.65%
2012	253	−0.62%
2017	252	−0.08%
2023	237	−1.02%
Source: INSEE

== Heraldry ==
Arms of Bersillies	The arms of Bersillies are blazoned : Or, 3 chevrons sable. (Bersillies, Boeschepe, Boussières-sur-Sambre, Colleret, Cousolre, Flaumont-Waudrechies, Hautmont, Limont-Fontaine, Lompret, Masny, Neuville-en-Avesnois and Saint-Rémy-du-Nord use the same arms.)

== See also ==
- Communes of the Nord department
