= Rudolf Klimke =

German World War I flying ace

- Born: 8 November 1890; Merseburg, German Empire
- Died: 17 March 1987 (aged 96); Bückeburg, East Germany
- Burial place: Bückeburg, Friedhof an der Scheier Straße, Germany
- Military career
- Allegiance: German Empire; Weimar Republic; Nazi Germany
- Branch: Artillery; aviation
- Rank: Leutnant (World War I); Colonel (World War II)
- Units: Artillery Regiment No. 75; Artillery Regiment No. 10; Feldflieger Abteilung 55 (Field Flier Detachment 55); Flieger-Abteilung 50 (Flier Detachment 50); Flieger-Abteilung 19 (Flier Detachment 19); Kampfstaffel 13 (Tactical Bomber Squadron 13) of Kampfgeschwader 3 (Tactical Bomber Wing 3); Jagdstaffel 27 (Fighter Squadron 27)
- Conflicts: World War I; World War II
- Awards: Iron Cross First Class

Leutnant Rudolf Klimke (8 November 1890 – 17 March 1987) IC was a German World War flying ace credited with 17 confirmed and two unconfirmed aerial victories. Serving initially as a bomber pilot, his aggressiveness in bombing England, and in shooting down a couple of enemy airplanes got him reassigned to a fighter squadron. After a string of a dozen victories during 1918, he was wounded in action on 21 September 1918.

== Biography ==
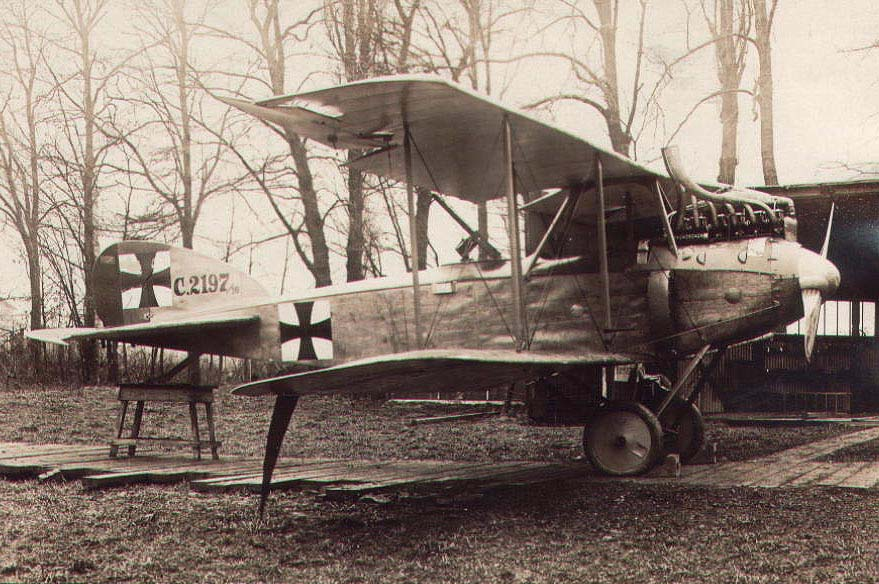
An Albatros C.VII whose front gun is being boresighted.

Rudolf Klimke was born in Merseburg on 8 November 1890. He began his mandated military service on 12 October 1910, serving in Artillery Regiment No. 75. When World War I began, Klimke was serving in Field Artillery Regiment No. 10. He transferred to aviation service on 8 August 1915. He was posted to Feldflieger Abteilung 55 (Field Flier Detachment 55) in 1916. He scored his first credited aerial victory while posted with them, shooting down a Morane Parasol over Bourney, south of Krewo on the Russian Front on 25 September 1916.

After a tour of duty with Flieger-Abteilung 50 (Flier Detachment 50), Klimke was transferred to Flieger-Abteilung 19 (Flier Detachment 19). On the night of 6/7 May 1917, Klimke and aerial observer Oberleutnant Walter Leon flew an Albatros C.VII out of an airfield near Ostend, Belgium. The commander of Flieger-Abteilung 19 (Flier Detachment 19) had authorized their bombing of England. When Klimke and Leon returned from dropping five ten-kilogram bombs on Hackney and Holloway, they were reprimanded. Nevertheless, he would raid England again, on 7 July 1917. Flying a three-seater Gotha gunship for Kampfgeschwader 3 (Tactical Bomber Wing 3), he shot down a Sopwith over London for his second aerial victory.

Klimke then underwent transition training and became a fighter pilot. He was posted to Jagdstaffel 27 (Fighter Squadron 27) on 12 September 1917; he posted an unsuccessful combat claim on the 16th. He then shot down two Sopwith Camels on 26 September. His fifth victory came on 24 October; that made him an ace. As 1918 began, Klimke began a steady accumulation of victories. Beginning with an unconfirmed claim on 29 January, by 13 August Klimke's list of victims numbered 14. On 26 August 1918, Klimke shot down American ace Robert Todd.

At some point, Klimke flew a Fokker Triplane. His mother dictated his insignia. She believed an anchor symbolized 'good hope'. Klimke's airplane bore a black anchor on its fuselage, as well as both elevators.

It is not known what model fighter he was flying on 21 September 1918, when he shot down a Camel for his 17th victim. It is known that the crew of a Bristol F.2b hit Klimke in the shoulder with three bullets. Somehow he managed to fly back to the safety of his home field and land. He was rushed from the airfield to the hospital. The hospital was bombed that night.

The war ended before Klimke could heal enough to return to duty. He had been awarded the Iron Cross First Class.
