= Lompret =

- Commune
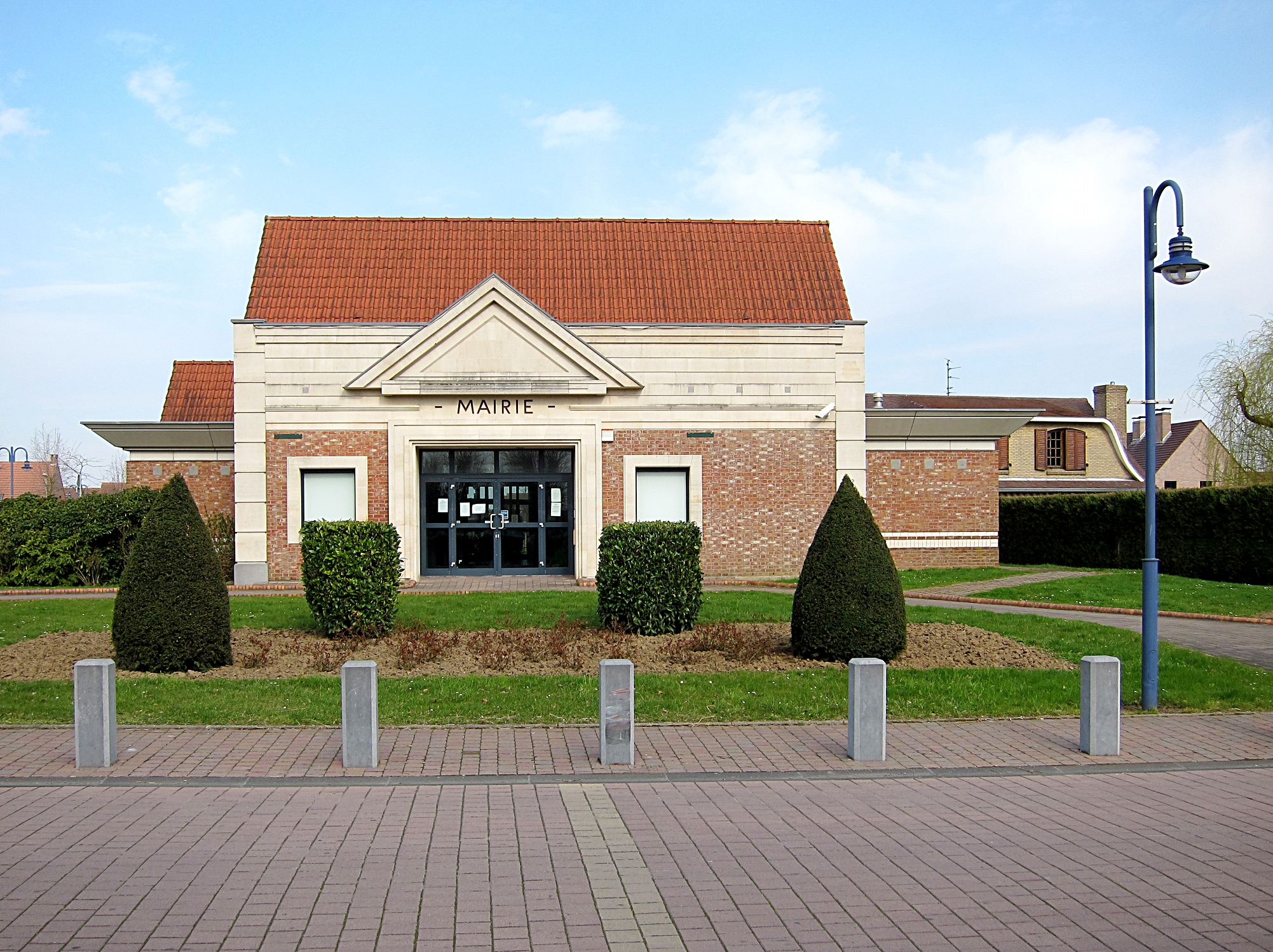
- The town hall in Lompret

- Coat of arms
- Location of Lompret
- Location within France Location within Hauts-de-France
- Coordinates: 50°40′10″N 2°59′24″E
- Country: France
- Region: Hauts-de-France
- Department: Nord
- Arrondissement: Lille
- Canton: Lambersart
- Intercommunality: Métropole Européenne de Lille

Government
  - Mayor (2020–2026): Hélène Moeneclaey
- Area^{1}: 3.1 km^{2} (1.2 sq mi)
- Elevation: 39 m (128 ft)
- Highest elevation: 34 m (112 ft)
- Lowest elevation: 22 m (72 ft)
- Population (2023): 2,155
  - Density: 700/km^{2} (1,800/sq mi)
- Time zone: UTC+01:00 (CET)
  - Summer (DST): UTC+02:00 (CEST)
- INSEE/Postal code: 59356 /59840
- ^{1} French Land Register data, which excludes lakes, ponds, glaciers > 1 km^{2} (0.386 sq mi or 247 acres) and river estuaries.

Lompret (French pronunciation: [lɔ̃pʁɛ]) is a commune in the Nord department in northern France. It is part of the Métropole Européenne de Lille.

== Population ==
Historical population
Year	Pop.	±% p.a.
1968	1,218	—
1975	1,344	+1.42%
1982	1,696	+3.38%
1990	1,873	+1.25%
1999	2,358	+2.59%
2007	2,367	+0.05%
2012	2,300	−0.57%
2017	2,299	−0.01%
2023	2,155	−1.07%
Source: INSEE

== Heraldry ==
Arms of Lompret	The arms of Lompret are blazoned : Or, 3 chevrons sable. (Bersillies, Boeschepe, Boussières-sur-Sambre, Colleret, Cousolre, Flaumont-Waudrechies, Hautmont, Limont-Fontaine, Lompret, Masny, Neuville-en-Avesnois and Saint-Rémy-du-Nord use the same arms.)

== See also ==
- Communes of the Nord department
