= Flaumont-Waudrechies =

- Commune
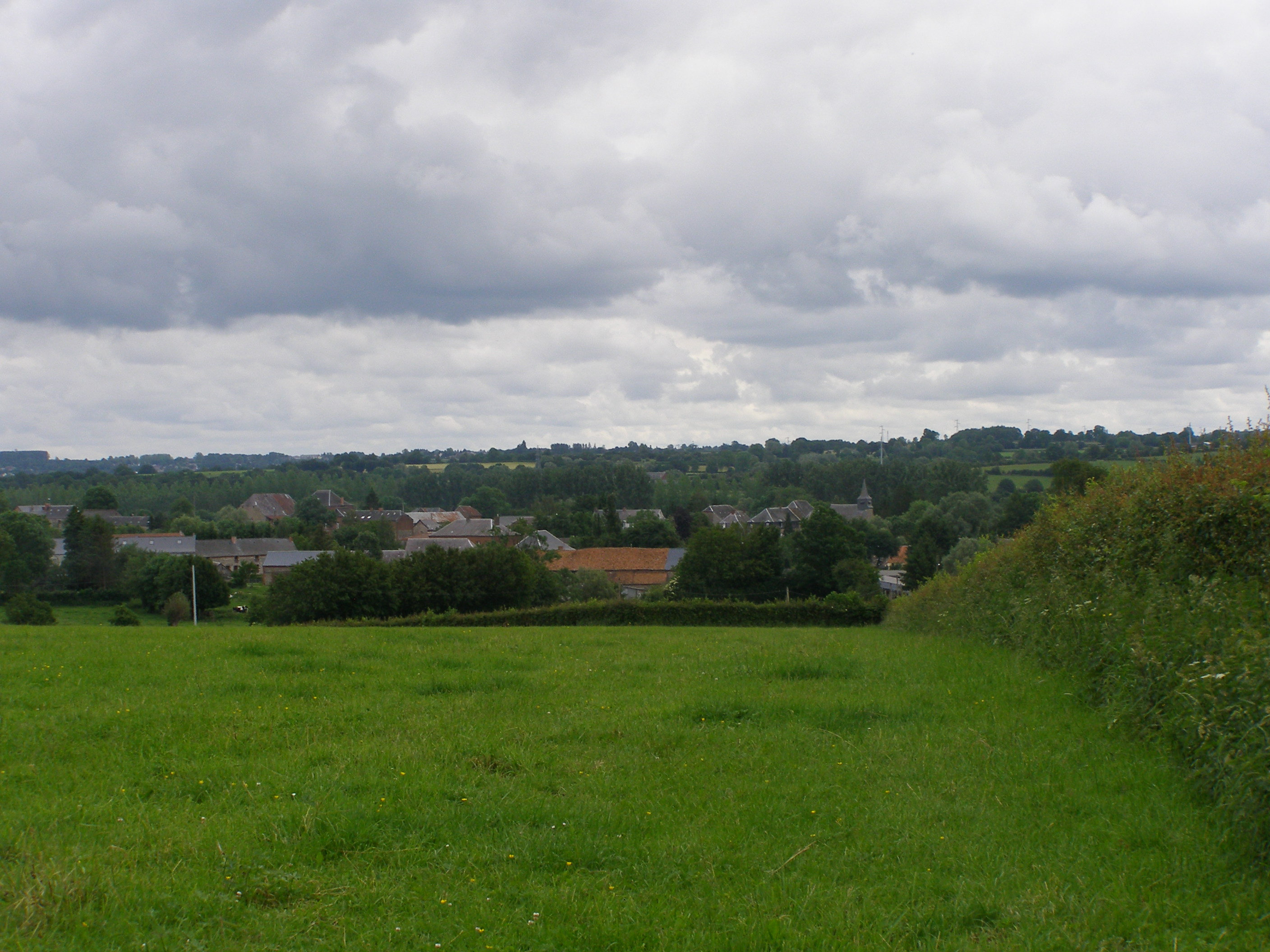
- A general view of Flaumont-Waudrechies

- Coat of arms
- Location of Flaumont-Waudrechies
- Location within France Location within Hauts-de-France
- Coordinates: 50°07′37″N 3°58′10″E
- Country: France
- Region: Hauts-de-France
- Department: Nord
- Arrondissement: Avesnes-sur-Helpe
- Canton: Fourmies
- Intercommunality: Cœur de l'Avesnois

Government
  - Mayor (2020–2026): Jean-Marie Vin
- Area^{1}: 5.7 km^{2} (2.2 sq mi)
- Elevation: 133 m (436 ft)
- Highest elevation: 204 m (669 ft)
- Lowest elevation: 147 m (482 ft)
- Population (2023): 342
  - Density: 60/km^{2} (160/sq mi)
- Time zone: UTC+01:00 (CET)
  - Summer (DST): UTC+02:00 (CEST)
- INSEE/Postal code: 59233 /59440
- ^{1} French Land Register data, which excludes lakes, ponds, glaciers > 1 km^{2} (0.386 sq mi or 247 acres) and river estuaries.

Flaumont-Waudrechies (French pronunciation: [flomɔ̃ wodʁəʃi]) is a commune in the Nord department in northern France.

== Heraldry ==
Arms of Flaumont-Waudrechies	The arms of Flaumont-Waudrechies are blazoned : Or, 3 chevrons sable. (Bersillies, Boeschepe, Boussières-sur-Sambre, Colleret, Cousolre, Flaumont-Waudrechies, Hautmont, Limont-Fontaine, Lompret, Masny, Neuville-en-Avesnois and Saint-Rémy-du-Nord use the same arms.)

== See also ==
- Communes of the Nord department
