= Cousolre =

- Commune
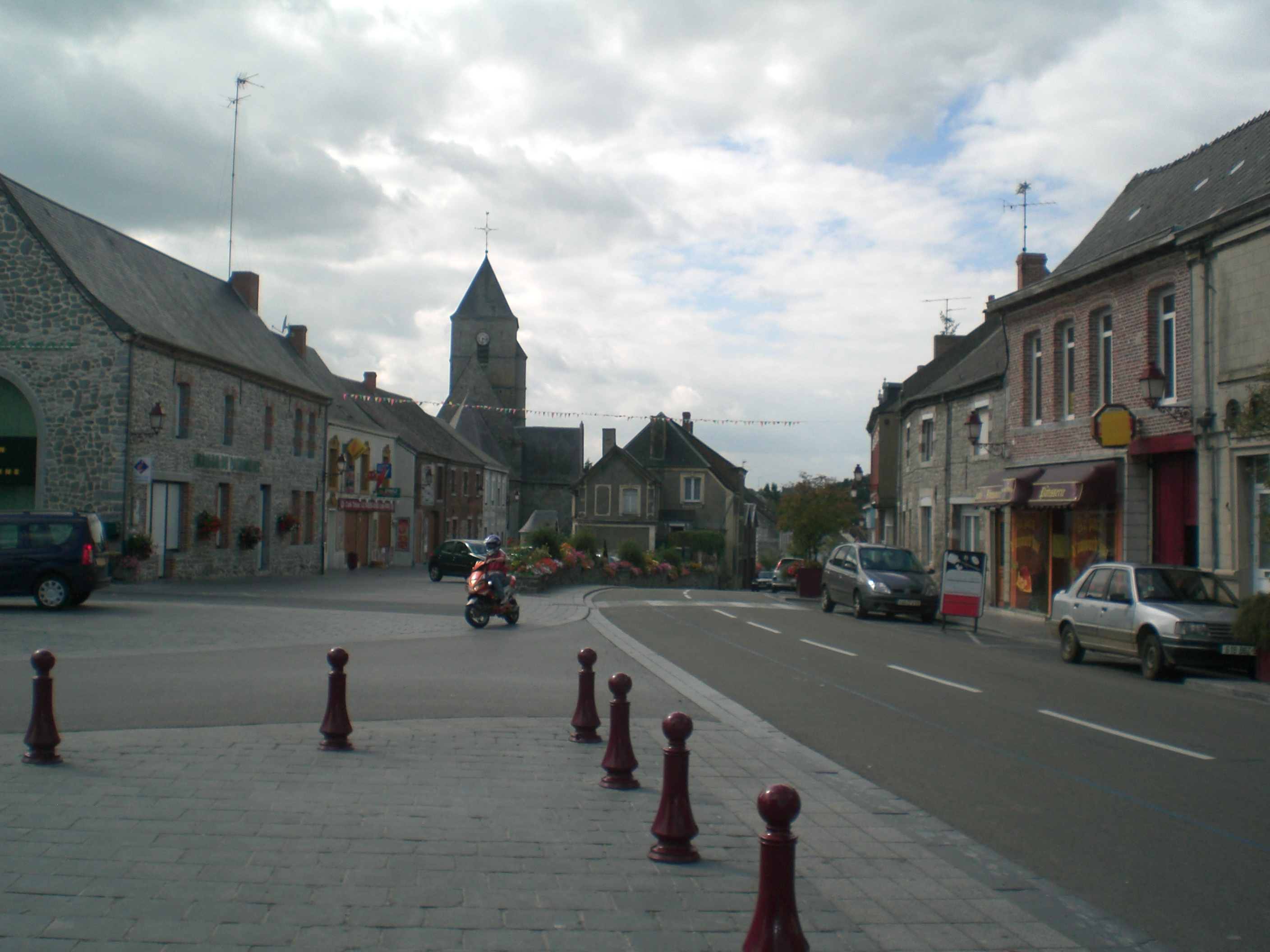
- A view within Cousolre

- Coat of arms
- Location of Cousolre
- Location within France Location within Hauts-de-France
- Coordinates: 50°14′47″N 4°09′00″E
- Country: France
- Region: Hauts-de-France
- Department: Nord
- Arrondissement: Avesnes-sur-Helpe
- Canton: Fourmies
- Intercommunality: CA Maubeuge Val de Sambre

Government
  - Mayor (2021–2026): Albert Jallay
- Area^{1}: 20.98 km^{2} (8.10 sq mi)
- Highest elevation: 229 m (751 ft)
- Lowest elevation: 143 m (469 ft)
- Population (2023): 2,153
  - Density: 102.6/km^{2} (265.8/sq mi)
- Time zone: UTC+01:00 (CET)
  - Summer (DST): UTC+02:00 (CEST)
- INSEE/Postal code: 59157 /59149
- ^{1} French Land Register data, which excludes lakes, ponds, glaciers > 1 km^{2} (0.386 sq mi or 247 acres) and river estuaries.

Cousolre (French pronunciation: [kusɔ(l)ʁ]) is a commune in the Nord department in northern France.

The nearest major city is Charleroi in Belgium (the village is very close to the Belgian border). It is about 25 km (16 mi) southwest of Charleroi and 15 km (9.3 mi) east of Maubeuge.

== Population ==
Historical population
Year	Pop.	±% p.a.
1968	3,004	—
1975	2,894	−0.53%
1982	2,632	−1.35%
1990	2,471	−0.79%
1999	2,362	−0.50%
2007	2,504	+0.73%
2012	2,355	−1.22%
2017	2,270	−0.73%
2023	2,153	−0.88%
Source: INSEE

== Heraldry ==
Arms of Cousolre	The arms of Cousolre are blazoned : Or, 3 chevrons sable. (Bersillies, Boeschepe, Boussières-sur-Sambre, Colleret, Cousolre, Flaumont-Waudrechies, Hautmont, Limont-Fontaine, Lompret, Masny, Neuville-en-Avesnois and Saint-Rémy-du-Nord use the same arms.)

== See also ==
- Communes of the Nord department
