= Münsterdorf =

- Municipality
- Coat of arms

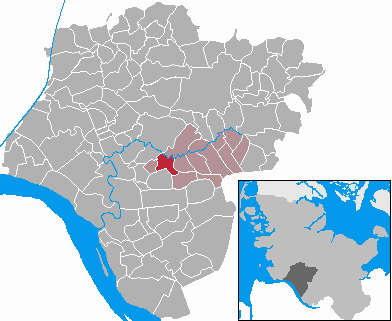
- Location of Münsterdorf within Steinburg district
- Interactive map of Münsterdorf
- Location within Germany Location within Schleswig-Holstein
- Coordinates: 53°54′12″N 9°32′27″E
- Country: Germany
- State: Schleswig-Holstein
- District: Steinburg
- Municipal assoc.: Breitenburg

Government
  - Mayor: Matthias Pokriefke

Area
  - Total: 5.11 km^{2} (1.97 sq mi)
- Elevation: 10 m (33 ft)

Population (2025-12-31)
  - Total: 1,821
  - Density: 356/km^{2} (923/sq mi)
- Time zone: UTC+01:00 (CET)
  - Summer (DST): UTC+02:00 (CEST)
- Postal codes: 25587
- Dialling codes: 04821
- Vehicle registration: IZ
- Website: www.muensterdorf.de

Münsterdorf is a municipality in the district of Steinburg, in Schleswig-Holstein, Germany.
