= Jagdstaffel 27 =

Jasta 27
- Active: 1917–1918
- Country: German Empire
- Branch: Luftstreitkräfte
- Type: Fighter squadron
- Engagements: World War I

Aircraft flown
- Fighter: Albatros D.III

Royal Prussian Jagdstaffel 27 (German: Königliche Preussische Jagdstaffel Nr. 27), commonly abbreviated to Jasta 27, was a "hunting group" (fighter squadron) of the Luftstreitkräfte, the air arm of the Imperial German Army during World War I.

== Operational history ==
=== As an independent squadron ===
Jasta 27 was formed on 5 February 1917 at Ghent with eight aircraft and pilots. Armee-Flug-Park 4 (Army Flight Park 4) at Ghent contributed three aircraft and pilots to the foundation. Two aircraft and pilots were transferred in from both Jagdstaffel 8 and Jagdstaffel 18. The newly appointed Staffelfuhrer (Squadron commander), Hans von Keudell, brought his own plane to the new unit, for the eighth aircraft. The newly formed unit moved forward to Gistel.

On 15 February 1917, Keudell led two of his pilots into combat in a three plane element of Albatros D.IIIs. He scored the first victory for the new squadron—his 12th overall—when he shot down a two-seater reconnaissance Nieuport from No. 46 Squadron RAF. He was also killed in action during the fight.

The new squadron languished under its new commander; in three months, they suffered three casualties without scoring a further victory. On 17 May, seven victory ace Hermann Göring was transferred to command Jasta 27. Two days later, Helmut Dilthey also transferred in. He noted that there were only three combat-ready aircraft in the jasta; all were inferior in performance to enemy aircraft. Göring soon changed that. In his previous assignment, he had come under the patronage of Crown Prince Wilhelm. Using his influence, the new Staffelfuhrer got rid of the subpar Roland fighters equipping the unit, replacing them with Albatros D.IIIs and Albatros D.Vs.

On 19 June 1917, Jasta 27 completed its move from Bersée, France—whence they supported 6th Armee—to Izegem, Belgium, to support 4th Armee. There they strove for air superiority during the Battle of Passchendaele, with Britain's elite No. 56 Squadron their major opposition. Jasta 27 began to score victories. By 21 October 1917, the unit was credited with 28 air victories. Air activity lessened through year's end.

Jasta 27 were anticipating being equipped with new Fokker Dr.Is in early 1918, but too few of the triplanes were produced to completely equip the jasta. On 2 February 1918, Jasta 27 was incorporated into a new fighter wing, Jagdgeschwader III (JG III). On 13 February, they co-located with the other squadrons joining JG III. By that time, they had about 40 victories to their credit.

=== Service in a fighter wing ===
Up until the end of the fighting in November 1918 Jasta 27 collectively accounted for 128 enemy aircraft and six observation balloons, and suffered eleven killed in action, three killed in flying accidents, and one taken prisoner of war.

== Commanding officers ==
Film clip of Göring in the cockpit of a Fokker D.VII

The following officers served as commanders (Staffelführer) of Jasta 27:

1. Lieutenant Hans von Keudell: 5 February 1917 – 15 February 1917
2. Lieutenant Erich Wieland: 22 February 1917 – 17 May 1917
3. Lieutenant Hermann Göring: 17 May 1917 – 28 July 1918
4. Lieutenant Hermann Frommherz: 29 July 1918 – 11 November 1918

== Aces ==
The following aces served in Jasta 27, with the number of victories credited during that time.

1. Hermann Frommherz (22)
2. Rudolf Klimke (15)
3. Wilhelm Neuenhofen (15)
4. Hermann Göring (14)
5. Friedrich Noltenius (13)
6. Willi Kampe (8)
7. Albert Lux (8)
8. Helmut Dilthey (6)
9. Willy Kahle (6)
10. Ludwig Luer (4)
11. Franz Brandt (3)
12. Willi Rosenstein (2)
13. Hans von Keudell (1)

== Bibliography ==
- VanWyngarden, Greg (2016). Aces of Jagdgeschwader III, Osprey Publishing. ISBN 978-1-4728-0843-1
