= Helmut Dilthey =

- Born: 9 February 1894; Rheydt, German Empire
- Died: 9 July 1918 (aged 24) near Lille, France
- Burial place: Lambersart Communal Cemetery, German Extension
- Military career
- Allegiance: German Empire
- Branch: Aviation
- Rank: Leutnant
- Units: Flieger-Abteilung 50; Jagdstaffel 27; Jagdstaffel 50
- Commands: Jagdstaffel 40
- Awards: Iron Cross First and Second Class

Leutnant Helmut Dilthey IC (9 February 1894 – 9 July 1918) was a German pilot who became a World War I flying ace credited with seven aerial victories.

Dilthey was one of the first German military aviators, joining its military aviation in November 1914. From 18 May 1915 through March 1917, he would serve in Flieger-Abteilung 50, flying reconnaissance and bombing missions in Russia while winning both classes of the Iron Cross and being promoted to leutnant. He also gained some experience on fighters with an assigned Fokker Eindekker.

When the Luftstreitkräfte founded dedicated fighter units, Dilthey volunteered for fighter duty. After training, he served under Hermann Göring in Jagdstaffel 27 and scored six victories over enemy fighters. He was then given command of Jagdstaffel 40. He downed an observation balloon while leading this squadron before being killed in action on 9 July 1918.

== Early life ==
Helmut Dilthey was born in Rheydt, Westphalia, the German Empire on 9 February 1894.

== Aerial service ==
Dilthey joined the German aerial service early in World War I, during November 1914. He was originally assigned to Flieger-Abteilung 50 on 18 May 1915, and served on the Eastern Front in Russia. While flying reconnaissance and bombing missions, he also gained some flight time in the Fokker Eindekker. He won the Iron Cross Second Class on 18 June 1915. The First Class Iron Cross followed on 1 October 1916, and Dilthey was commissioned as a leutnant.

When the Luftstreitkräfte formed Jagdstaffeln in Fall 1916, Dilthey volunteered to serve in one. He was then sent to Jastaschule for training as a fighter pilot in March 1917. On 19 May 1917, he was posted to Jagdstaffel 27 under the command of Hermann Göring. On 24 July, he began a string of six victories over enemy fighter planes. The last of these was on 5 February 1918, being Henry VC Luyt of 65 Sqd RFC. A fresh South African pilot with less than 4 hrs combat experience. Henry Luyt was in Camel B2394.

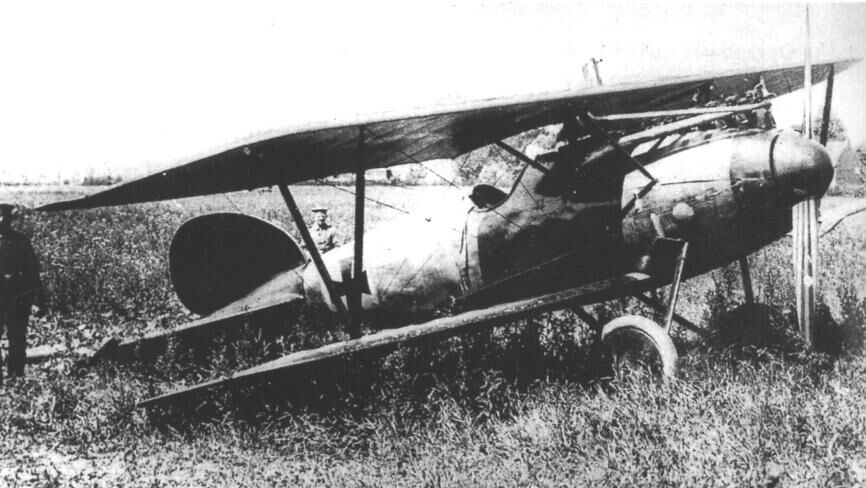
Helmut Dilthey's Albatros D.Va was similar to this; its fuselage was banded green and white.

He was then posted to Saxon Jagdstaffel 40 to command them as their Staffelführer. He was assigned an Albatros D.Va fighter, and had it vividly painted in the Saxon national colors of green and white. He downed an enemy observation balloon on 5 June 1918 for his final victory.

On 9 July 1918, he attacked an Airco DH.9 of No. 107 Squadron RAF over Lille, France. It is uncertain whether the rear gunner hit him, or whether he was hit by his own side's antiaircraft fire, but he was killed in action despite taking to his parachute. He was buried in the German extension of Lambersart Communal Cemetery.
