= Willi Kampe =

- Born: 15 March 1888; Hofgeismar, German Empire
- Died: 8 March 1918 (aged 29) near Gheluvelt, Belgium
- Military career
- Allegiance: German Empire
- Branch: Aviation
- Service years: 1908-1910, 1914-1918
- Rank: Offizierstellvertreter
- Units: Flieger-Abteilung (Flier Detachment) 35; Jagdstaffel 8 (Fighter Squadron 8); Jagdstaffel 27 (Fighter Squadron 27)
- Awards: Iron Cross

Offizierstellvertreter Willi Kampe (15 March 1888 – 8 March 1918) was a World War I german flying ace credited with eight aerial victories.

== Biography ==
Willi Kampe was born on 15 March 1888 in Hofgeismar, the German Empire. He performed his mandatory military service in the Imperial German Army between 1908 and 1910, serving with the 4th Guards Grenadier Regiment.

When World War I broke out in 1914, Kampe was recalled to service; he joined the 5th Guards Regiment. He transferred to Die Fliegertruppe (the flying troops) in 1915. He first flew with Flieger-Abteilung (Flier Detachment) 35, before transferring to a fighter squadron, Jagdstaffel 8 for a short spell. On 15 February 1917, he took a posting with Jagdstaffel 27.

Beginning 12 August 1917, Kampe would shoot down eight opposing airplanes—seven fighters and an Airco DH.4 light bomber. His final victory came 8 March 1918 near Ypres, when he shot down a No. 19 Squadron Sopwith Dolphin at 1208 hours. He was killed in action in the process, probably by another 19 Squadron Dolphin flown by RAF 'ace' Capt. Patrick Huskinson. Willi Kampe had been honored with both classes of the Iron Cross by the time of his death.
