= Masny =

- Commune
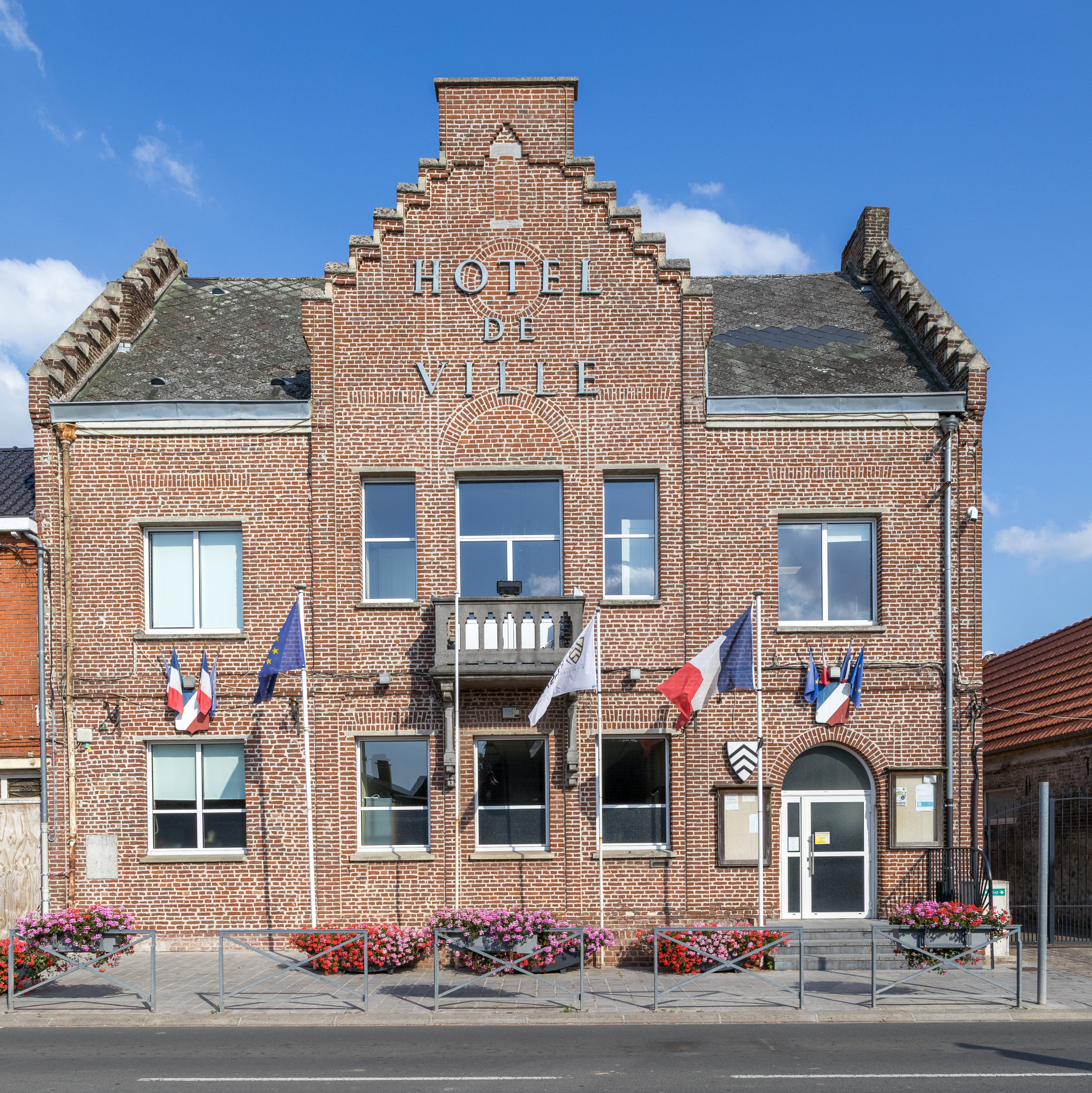
- The town hall in Masny

- Coat of arms
- Location of Masny
- Location within France Location within Hauts-de-France
- Coordinates: 50°20′57″N 3°12′08″E
- Country: France
- Region: Hauts-de-France
- Department: Nord
- Arrondissement: Douai
- Canton: Aniche
- Intercommunality: CC Cœur d'Ostrevent

Government
  - Mayor (2020–2026): Lionel Fontaine
- Area^{1}: 7.12 km^{2} (2.75 sq mi)
- Elevation: 35 m (115 ft)
- Highest elevation: 58 m (190 ft)
- Lowest elevation: 18 m (59 ft)
- Population (2023): 3,999
  - Density: 562/km^{2} (1,450/sq mi)
- Time zone: UTC+01:00 (CET)
  - Summer (DST): UTC+02:00 (CEST)
- INSEE/Postal code: 59390 /59176
- ^{1} French Land Register data, which excludes lakes, ponds, glaciers > 1 km^{2} (0.386 sq mi or 247 acres) and river estuaries.

Masny (French pronunciation: [mani]) is a commune in the Nord department in northern France.

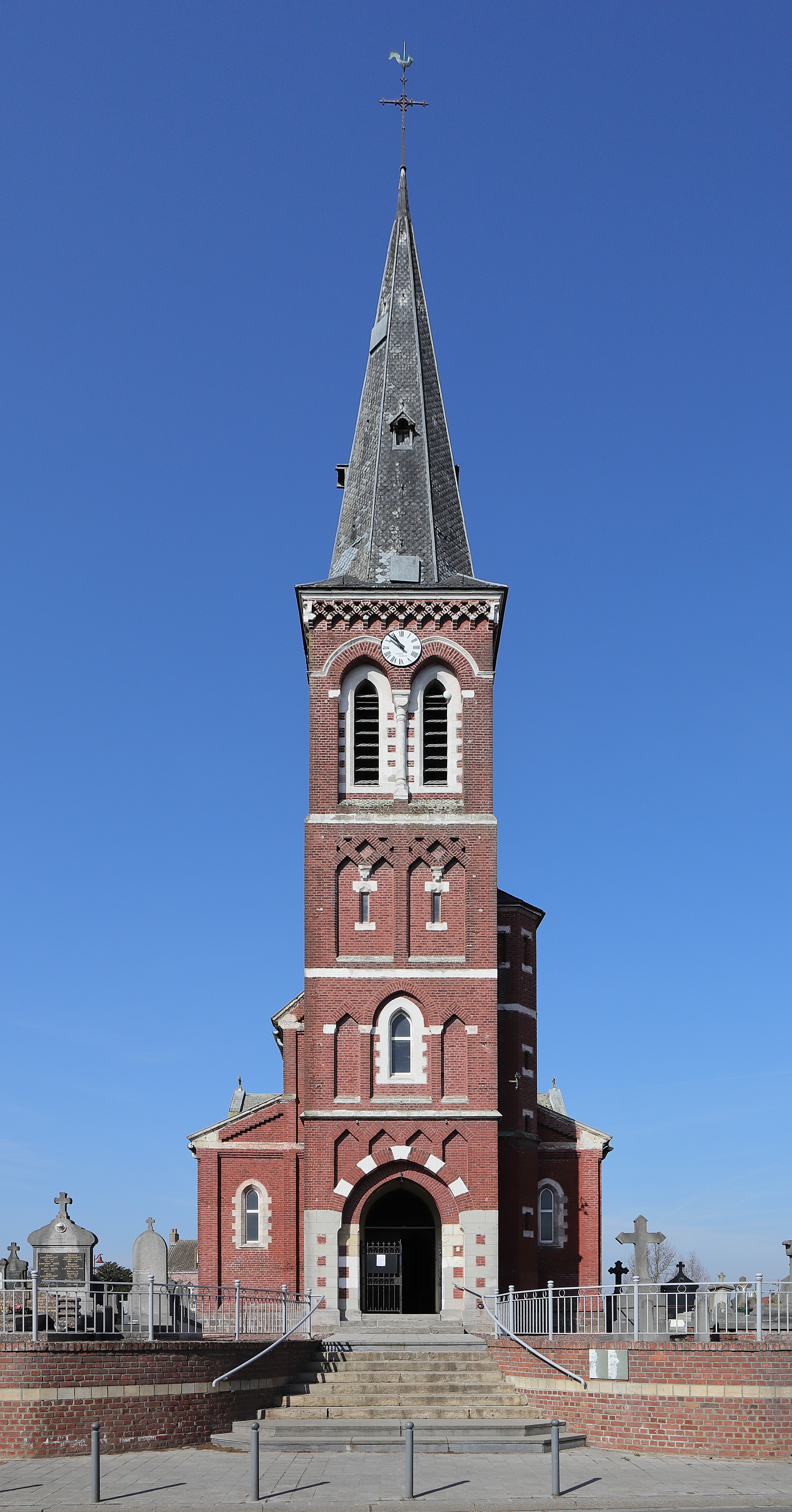
Saint Martin Church

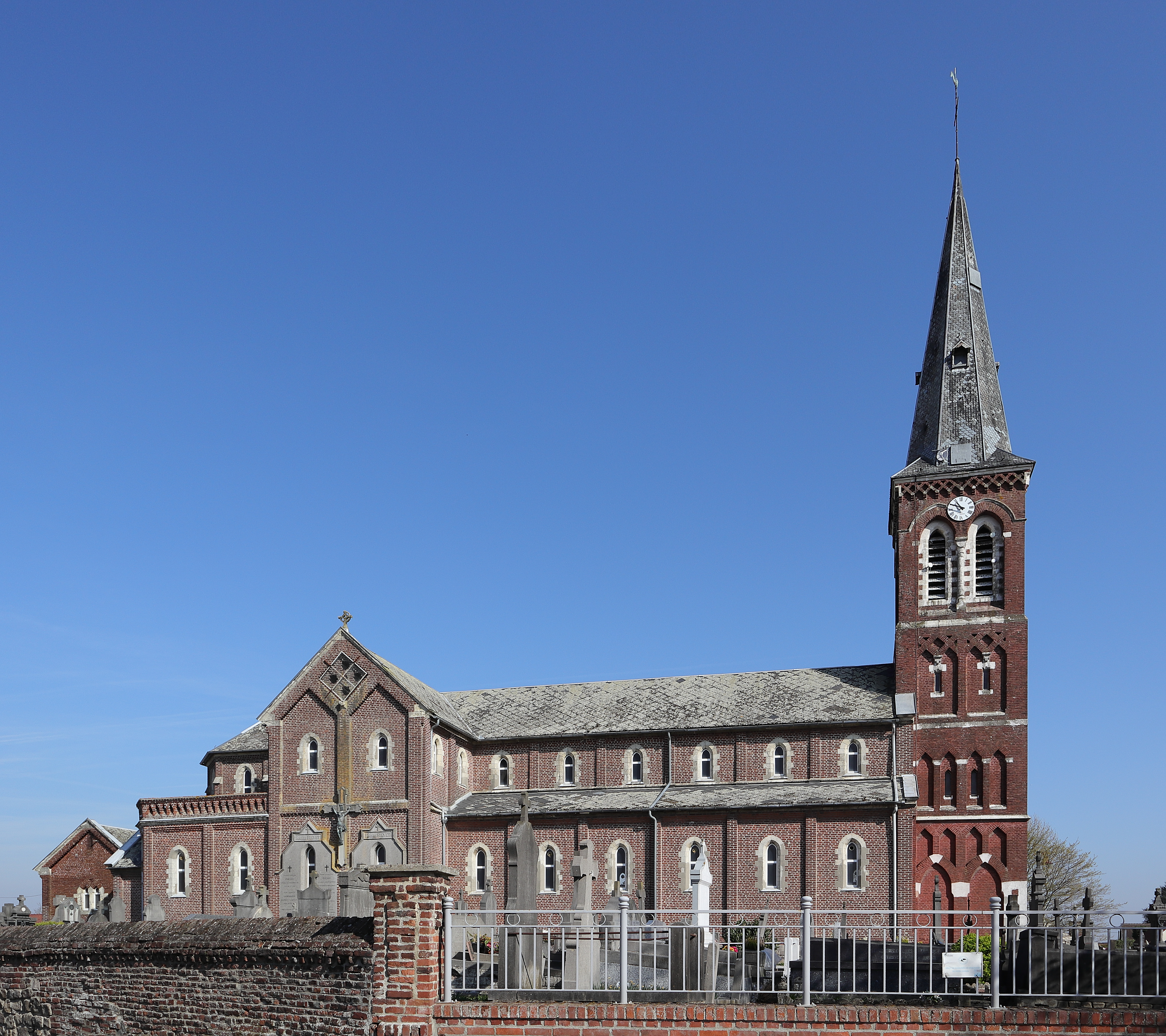

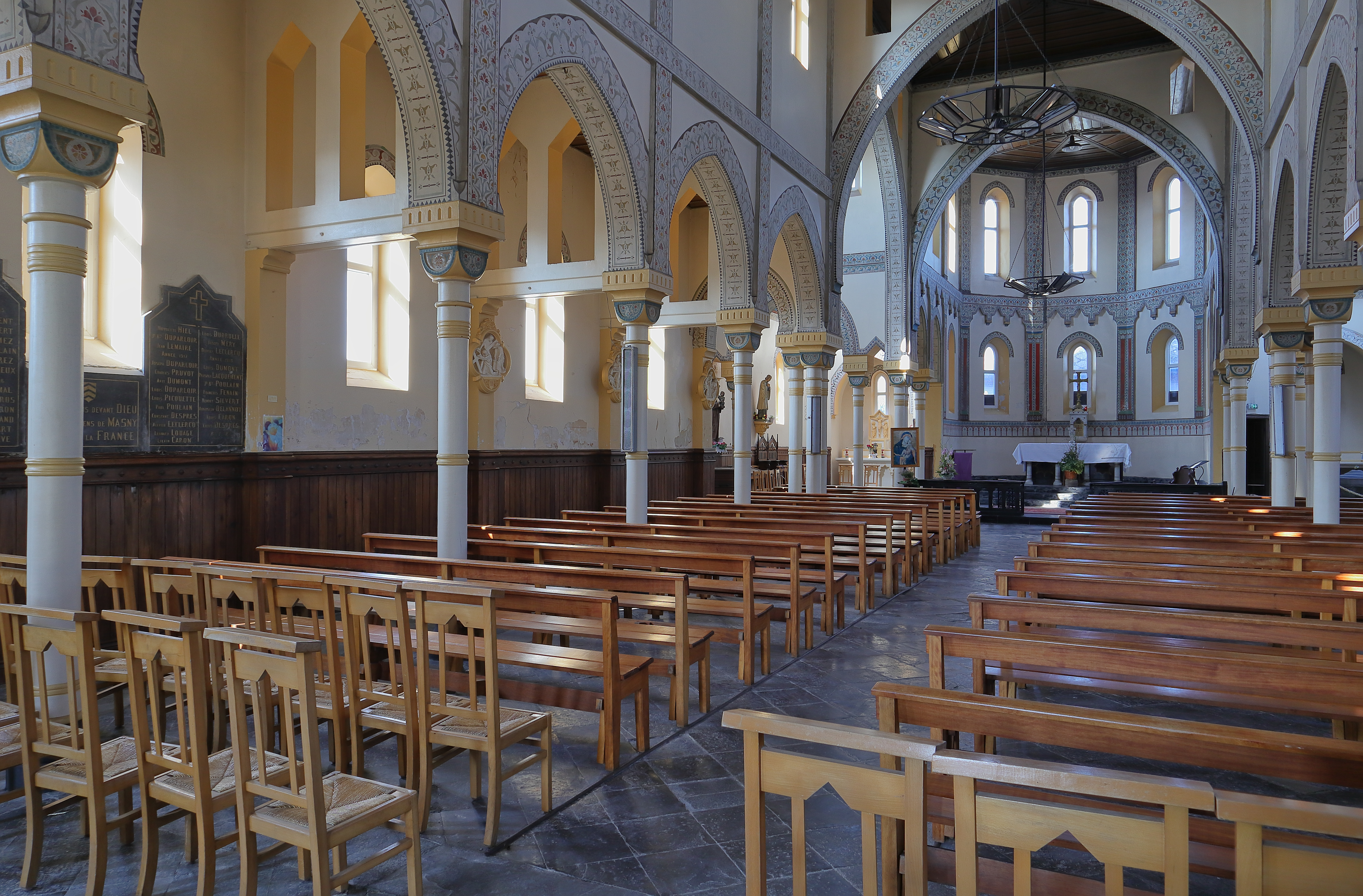

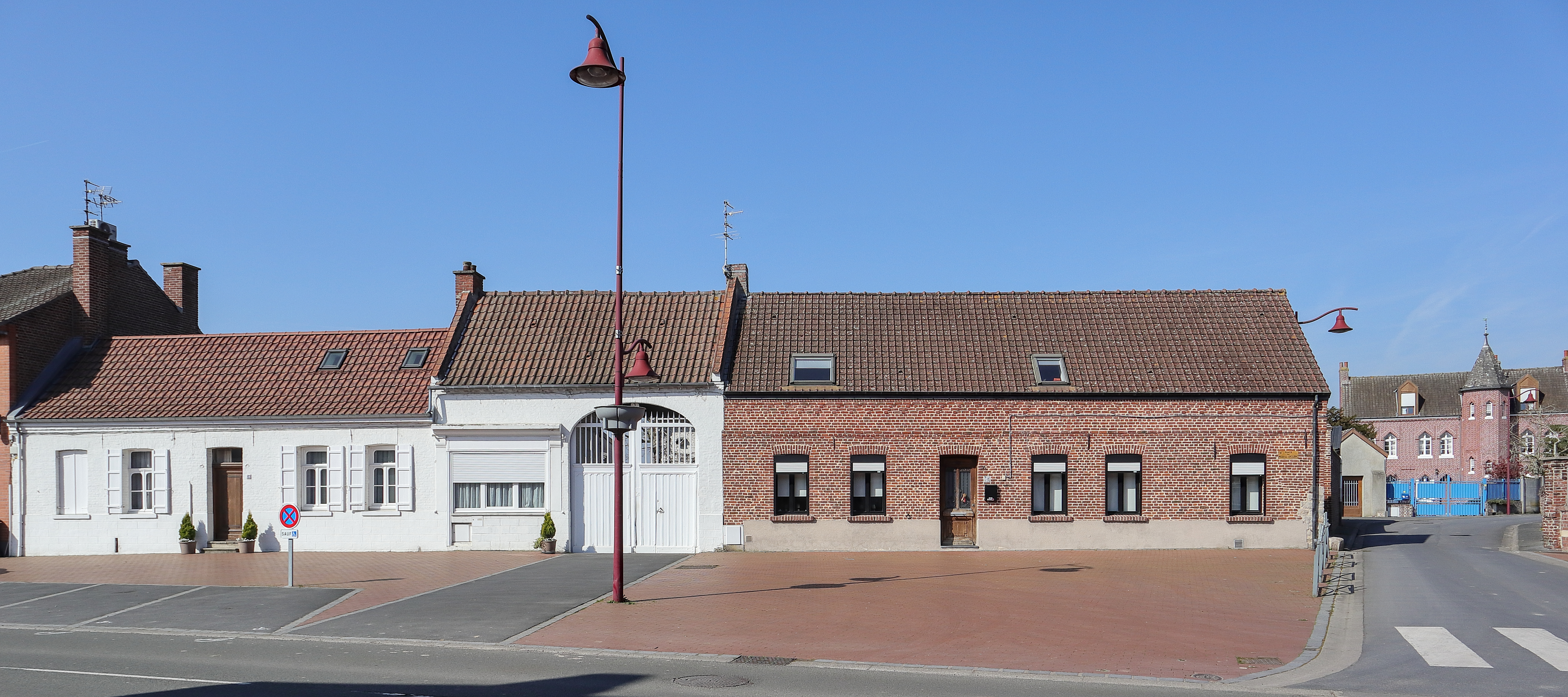
Marshal Leclerc Square

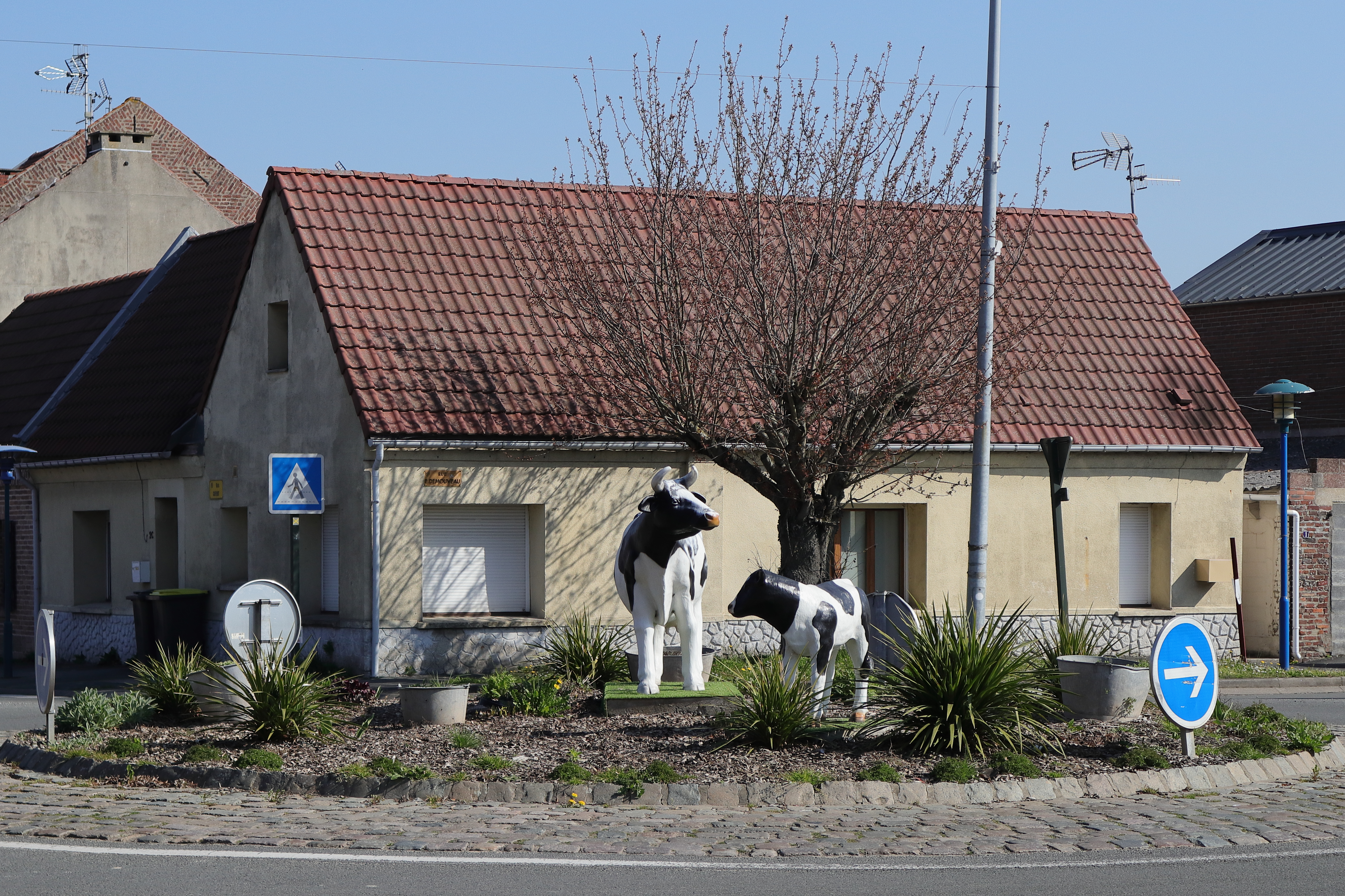
A roundabout

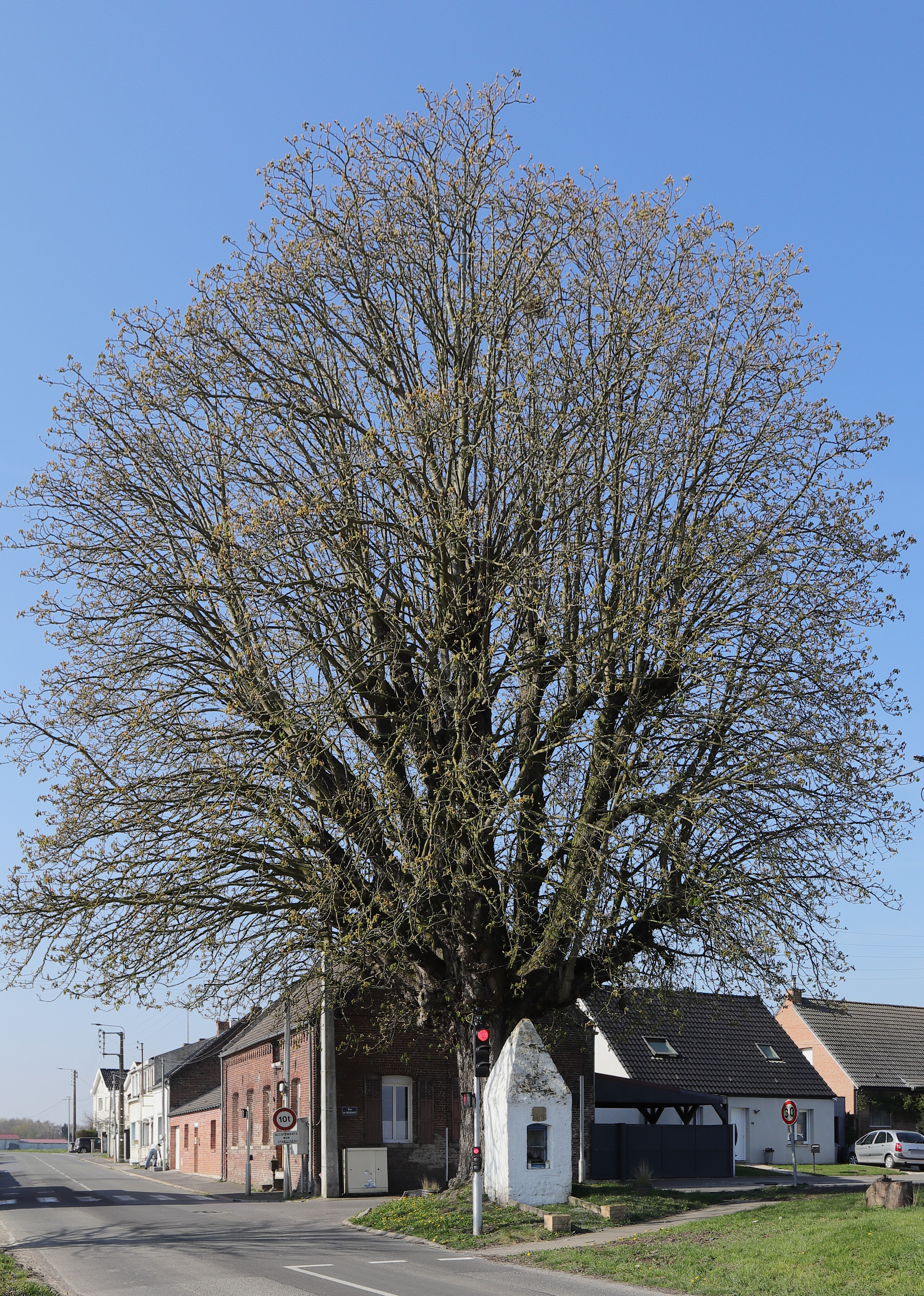
Our Lady of the Storms Oratory

== Population ==
Historical population
Year	Pop.	±% p.a.
1968	4,463	—
1975	4,303	−0.52%
1982	4,485	+0.59%
1990	4,688	+0.55%
1999	4,571	−0.28%
2007	4,481	−0.25%
2012	4,176	−1.40%
2017	4,143	−0.16%
2023	3,999	−0.59%
Source: INSEE

== Heraldry ==
Arms of Masny	The arms of Masny are blazoned : Or, 3 chevrons sable. (Bersillies, Boeschepe, Boussières-sur-Sambre, Colleret, Cousolre, Flaumont-Waudrechies, Hautmont, Limont-Fontaine, Lompret, Masny, Neuville-en-Avesnois and Saint-Rémy-du-Nord use the same arms.)

== See also ==
- Communes of the Nord department
