= Wilhelm Gisbert Groos =

German flying ace

- Born: 10 August 1894; German Empire
- Died: 1997 (aged 102–103); Germany
- Military career
- Allegiance: German Empire
- Branch: Luftstreitkräfte
- Service years: 1914–1918
- Rank: Leutnant
- Units: Jagdstaffel 4 Jagdstaffel 11
- Awards: Iron Cross; Honour Cross

Wilhelm Gisbert Groos was a German World War I flying ace credited with seven aerial victories.

== Early life ==
Wilhelm Gisbert Groos (often written Gisbert Wilhelm) was born on 10 August 1894 to Dr. Ernst Gisbert Karl Julius Georg Groos and Laura Maria Colsman. He was admitted to the Prussian Cadet Corps and later served in an Uhlan Regiment. While an Ensign before the First World War, he had been training to compete in the 3,000 metre race at the 1916 Summer Olympics.

== World War I service ==
Groos received his pilot's licence from the Halberstadt Civil Flying School. He joined Jasta 4 in May 1917. On 17 May, he scored his first victory while flying over Droucourt, France against a British Sopwith triplane. Shortly afterwards, he was transferred to Jasta 11 on 24 May. He is credited with achieving five further victories between 24 June and 23 August. After Wilhelm Reinhard was wounded, Groos was briefly given command of Jasta 11 between 6–11 September. He relinquished command when Kurt Wolff returned from leave. Groos was wounded on 14 September and Wolff was killed the following day. After Wolff's death, Groos briefly reassumed command again between 15 and 25 September until Lothar von Richthofen was given the position.

After Groos recovered he was appointed a position within Jastaschule II in Nivelles. However, he returned to Jasta 11 on 10 July 1918 for a short time when there became a shortage of pilots. On 1 August 1918, he scored his last victory against a British SPAD aircraft. Shortly afterwards, he returned to Jastaschule II on 16 September and remained there for the rest of the war.

== Post World War I ==
Gross retired from the Luftstreitkräfte after the war. He married three times and had two sons, Manfred Wilhelm and Ernst Gisbert. He became the director of the Westdeutschen Steinzeug-Werke company in Euskirchen. In 1994, Groos celebrated his 100th birthday. He died in 1997 near Cologne/Bonn, around 103 years old. At the time of his death he was the last surviving member of Jasta 11.
