= List of World War I aces from Poland =

This is a list of World War I flying aces who were born in the territory of the present-day Republic of Poland. Poland was not an independent country during World War I, and pilots born there served in several different air forces. They may therefore also appear in other lists of aces. Some of them also fought in the struggles that echoed through Europe in the aftermath of World War I.

This list is incomplete.

Name	Air service(s)	Victories	Notes
Manfred von Richthofen	German Luftstreitkräfte	80 victories	Leading ace of the war. Pour le Mérite plus 22 other awards.
Godwin von Brumowski	Austro-Hungarian Luftfahrtruppen	35 victories	Leading Austro-Hungarian ace. Order of the Iron Crown, Order of Leopold, Medal for Bravery, Military Merit Medal, Iron Cross.
Frank Linke-Crawford	Austro-Hungarian Luftfahrtruppen	27 victories	Fourth ranking Austro-Hungarian ace. Order of the Iron Crown.
Hans-Georg von der Marwitz	German Luftstreitkräfte	15 victories	Royal House Order of Hohenzollern, Iron Cross
Dieter Collin	German Luftstreitkräfte	13 victories	Iron Cross
Johannes Janzen	German Luftstreitkräfte	13 victories	Iron Cross
Erich Rüdiger von Wedel	German Luftstreitkräfte	13 victories	Royal House Order of Hohenzollern, Iron Cross
Willi Gabriel	German Luftstreitkräfte	11 victories	Iron Cross
Donat Makijonek	Imperial Russian Air Service, Polish Air Force	8 victories	Cross of Saint George (2nd, 3rd, and 4th Class Awards), Order of Saint Vladimir, Order of Saint Stanislaus (Imperial House of Romanov), Order of Saint Anne (3rd and 4th Class Awards).
Hans Schilling	German Luftstreitkräfte	8 victories	Royal House Order of Hohenzollern
Alfred Fleischer	German Luftstreitkräfte	6 victories	Iron Cross First Class.
Mieczysław Garsztka	German Luftstreitkräfte, Polish Air Force	6 victories	Iron Cross First and Second Class, Virtuti Militari Fifth Class.
Tadeusz Grochowalski	Imperial Russian Air Service	5 victories	
Wiktor Komorowski	Imperial Russian Air Service	5 victories	
Julius Kowalczik	Austro-Hungarian Luftfahrtruppen	5 victories	
Antoni Mroczkowski	Imperial Russian Air Service, Polish Air Force	5 victories	Served in Polish-Soviet War.
Stefan Peter	Austro-Hungarian Luftfahrtruppen	5 victories	
