= Kurt Wolff (aviator) =

German flying ace, born 1895

- Wolff in 1917. Note the war souvenirs in the background.
- Born: 6 February 1895; Greifswald, Pomerania
- Died: 15 September 1917 (aged 22) near Moorslede, Belgium
- Military career
- Allegiance: German Empire
- Branch: Luftstreitkräfte
- Service years: 1912–1917
- Rank: Oberleutnant
- Nickname: 'Delicate Little Flower'
- Units: Kampfstaffel 26 (Bomber Squadron 26); Kampfgeschwader 7 (Combat Squadron 7); Kampfgeschwader 40 (Combat Squadron 40); Royal Prussian Jagdstaffel 11 (Hunting Team 11)
- Commands: Royal Prussian Jagdstaffel 29 (Hunting Team 29); Royal Prussian Jagdstaffel 11 (Hunting Team 11)
- Awards: Prussian: Pour le Mérite; House Order of Hohenzollern; Iron Cross; Bavarian: Bavarian Military Merit Order, 4th Class with Swords; Iron Cross, both second and first class

Oberleutnant Kurt Robert Wilhelm Wolff PlM (6 February 1895 – 15 September 1917) was one of Imperial Germany's highest-scoring fighter aces during World War I. The frail youthful orphan originally piloted bombers before being picked by Manfred von Richthofen to join Jagdstaffel 11 (Fighter Squadron 11) in the burgeoning Imperial German Air Service. Under the tutelage of Richthofen, Wolff would shoot down 33 enemy aircraft in four months, including 22 victims during the Royal Flying Corps' disastrous Bloody April, 1917. Wolff scored victories so rapidly he outran the Prussian awards system; although the Pour le Merite was customarily awarded after a fighter ace's 20th victory, Wolff's was not received until after his 29th.

On 6 May 1917, after this 29th victory, Wolff was transferred to command Jagdstaffel 29 and score two victories. When Richthofen moved up from Jagdstaffel 11 to become the wing commander of the Flying Circus, his replacement as Jagdstaffel 11 commander was killed. Wolff was transferred to command his old squadron; he scored his 32nd and 33rd victories with them. On 11 July, he was wounded and grounded after a crash landing. On 12 September 1917, the day after he returned to duty, he was promoted to Oberleutnant. Three days later, Wolff made his final patrol, leading a patrol of five in a prototype Fokker Triplane. In a chaotic dogfight with Sopwith Camels from No. 10 Naval Squadron, Wolff nearly collided with his assailant, Norman MacGregor. As Wolff fell out of sight, MacGregor claimed an "out of control" victory. Wolff was probably dead before the triplane's explosive impact.

== Early life ==
Kurt Wolff was born in Greifswald, Pomerania. He was orphaned as a child and was raised by relatives in Memel, East Prussia. Wolff enlisted in the Bavarian Army in 1912 at the age of 17, joining a transport unit, Railway Regiment Nr. 4. He was still with this regiment when World War I began. He received a commission on 17 April 1915, and he transferred to the Fliegertruppen (Flying Troops) in July.

== Fighter pilot ==
=== Training and first posting ===
Wolff's first flight was almost his last. The instructor crashed the aircraft, killing himself; Wolff's shoulder was dislocated. Eventually, Wolff received his pilot's badge in late 1915 and was assigned to a series of two-seater bomber units over the next year.

On 12 October 1916 he was posted to La Brayelle Airfield in northern France to join the then victoryless Royal Prussian Jagdstaffel 11 (Hunting Team 11). For months, Wolff and his comrades in the squadron had had no success in aerial combat. That changed when command was given to the Red Baron, Rittmeister (Cavalry Captain) Manfred von Richthofen. Under the Red Baron's leadership, Jagdstaffel 11 began to score victories, and Wolff became an excellent fighter pilot. Like his commanding officer, Wolff soon became an avid collector of souvenirs from the aircraft he shot down. Wolff's room at his airfield soon became decorated with serial numbers, airplane parts and machine guns salvaged from his victims.

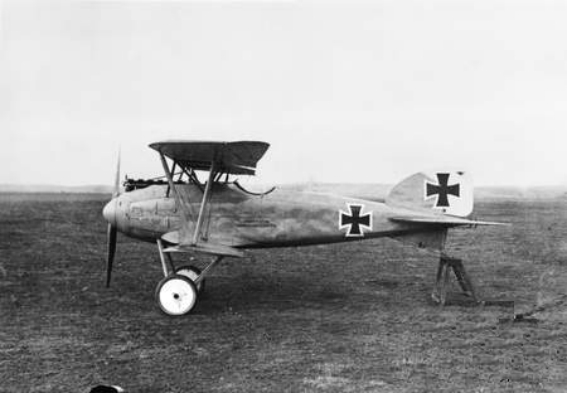
Albatros D.III German fighter c. 1917.

Like all the Jagdstaffel 11 aircraft, Wolff's Albatros D.III was painted in the unit's basic red livery. To this, he added individual markings for inflight identification by having his plane's elevators and tailplane painted green. He first claimed an aerial victory on 6 March 1917, a Royal Aircraft Factory B.E.2d of No. 16 Squadron RFC. Four more victories followed during March, making Wolff an ace.

=== Bloody April ===
By the end of March 1917, the Royal Flying Corps held a numerical edge over the Luftstreitkräfte of about two to one. The German aircraft numbered about 195; about half these could be used to attack other planes. By contrast, the British were fielding about 365 airplanes; a third were single-seat fighters. However, despite their superior numbers, the British aircraft were technologically inferior to the German fighters. Nevertheless, the British pushed their air offensive over the German lines to maintain their air superiority during April 1917, despite ongoing heavy casualties among their aircrew.

The British lost almost 250 aircraft to German action during Bloody April, 1917; the blood cost came to over 400 British aviators killed or wounded. Among Jagdstaffel 11 aces, Sebastian Festner shot down 10 British airplanes; Lothar von Richthofen shot down 15; Karl Emil Schaefer 16; Manfred von Richthofen 21; Kurt Wolff shot down 22. Besides the individual victories throughout the month, Wolff would score multiple victories on five April days. Most notable was Friday, 13 April, when Wolff shot down four British airplanes from four different squadrons on four sorties. Also notably, he scored three victories on 29 April 1917, including Major H.D. Harvey-Kelly, commander of No. 19 Squadron RFC. Wolff ended the month with his victims numbering 29. Having previously earned both classes of the Prussian Iron Cross, Wolff was awarded that kingdom's Knight's Cross with Swords of the Royal House Order of Hohenzollern on 26 April. Wolff's rapid victory pace had outrun the awards section; at 20 victories, he became eligible for the Pour le Mérite, but could not receive it before the yet-to-be awarded Hohenzollern.

=== Wolff in command ===
Wolff was awarded the German Empire's most prestigious award, the Prussian Pour le Mérite, on 4 May 1917. Two days later, with his victory total at 29, Wolff left his pilot's assignment with Jagdstaffel 11 when he was promoted to command Royal Prussian Jagdstaffel 29. Wolff shot down a French SPAD on 13 May and a No. 60 Squadron Nieuport 17 on 27 June before he returned to Jagdstaffel 11 as its commander in July 1917. Wolff was selected to replace Leutnant (Second lieutenant) Karl Allmenroeder, who had fallen in combat.

Wolff's youthful looks and frail physical stature masked his deadly skills as a combat pilot. As the Adjutant of Jagdstaffel 11, Karl Bodenschatz's estimate of Wolff was:

"...Leutnant Kurt Wolff. At first glance, you could only say 'delicate little flower'. A slender, thin little figure, a very young face, whose entire manner is one of extreme shyness. He looks as if you could tip him backwards with one harsh word. But below this friendly schoolboy's face dangles the order Pour le Mérite. And so far, these modest looking eyes have taken 30 enemy airplanes from the sky over the sights of his machine guns, set them afire, and made them smash to pieces on the ground."

During Wolff's assignment to Jagdstaffel 29 as its commander, Jagdstaffel 11 was one of four squadrons incorporated into the first German fighter wing, Jagdgeschwader I, on 24 June 1917. Manfred von Richthofen was promoted up from squadron command to lead the new wing. Inheriting Richthofen's Jagdstaffel 11 command and leading this squadron as part of the new wing, Wolff downed a RE-8 of No. 4 Squadron RFC and a Sopwith Triplane of No. 1 Naval Squadron in early July for his final victories, the 32nd and 33rd. However, on 11 July Wolff was shot in both his left hand and left shoulder by gunfire from a Sopwith Triplane flown by future ace Flight Sub-Lieutenant Herbert Rowley of No. 1 Naval Squadron. Wolff crash landed his aircraft on the Courtrai railway line. The crash ripped off the undercarriage and flipped the aircraft over. The wreck came to rest with Wolff's head within inches of smashing on a metal fence. His rescuers toted him off to the hospital. Wolff would not return from sick leave until 11 September. The day after his return, he was promoted to oberleutnant (lieutenant).

== Final fight ==
The first two Fokker Triplane prototypes had been allocated to Jagdgeschwader 1. Upon his return on 11 September, Wolff was eager to fly one of the prototypes in Richthofen's absence. Four days later, on 15 September he found his opportunity. Despite heavily overcast skies, he took off in Richthofen's prototype Triplane. He was flying the lone Triplane, leading a patrol of five Albatros fighters.

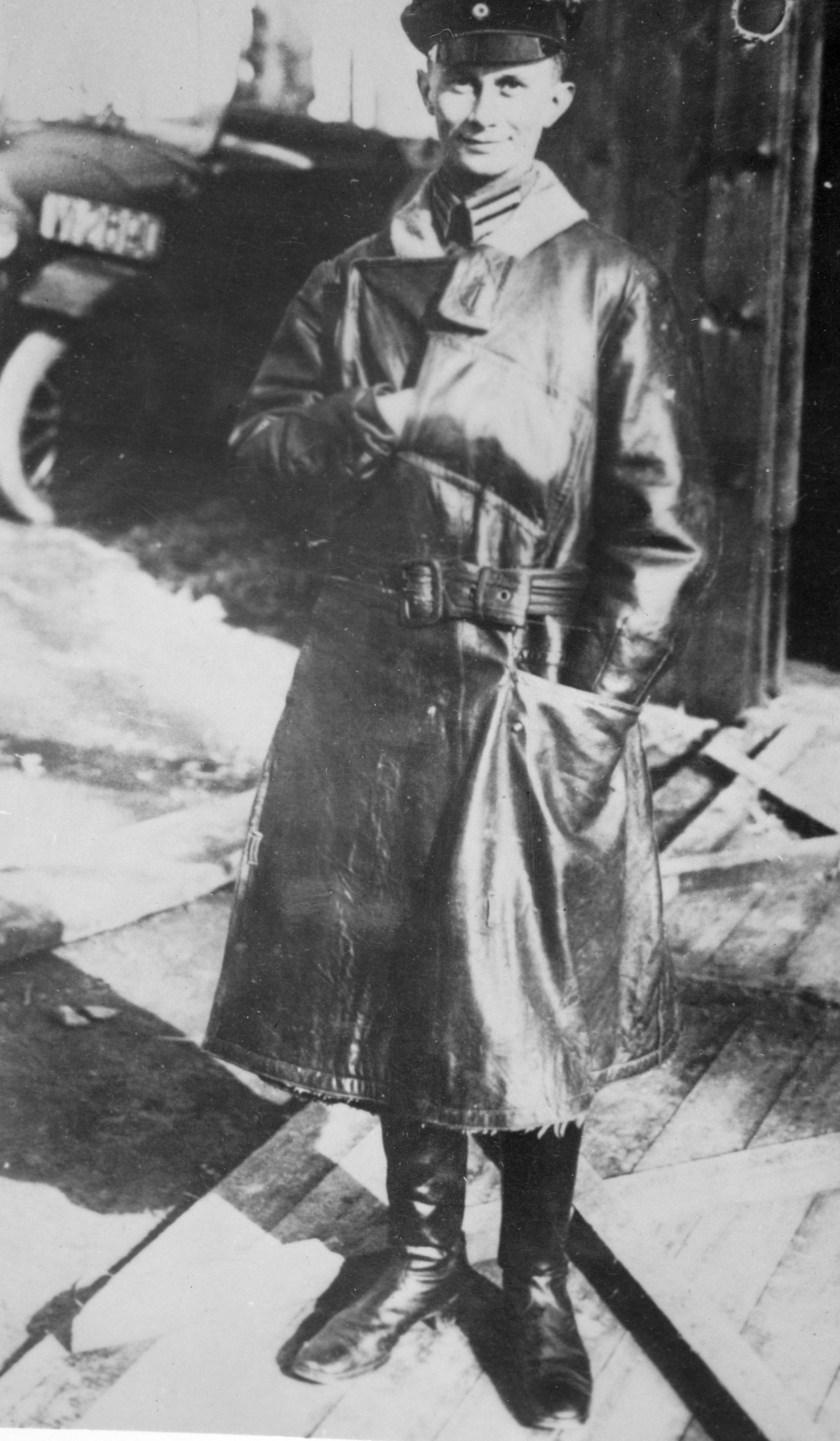
An informal photo of Kurt Wolff.

Meanwhile, three new Sopwith Camels of No. 10 Squadron Royal Naval Air Service, sallied forth from their lines on an offensive patrol. Somewhere in the vicinity of Moorslede, Belgium, at 16.30 hours the trio was the target of a diving attack by Wolff and his patrol. In the confusion of the dogfight, the British pilots mistakenly thought four triplanes were involved. As Wolff singled out a Camel to shoot down, he was suddenly fired on from behind by Flight Sub-Lieutenant Norman MacGregor. MacGregor fired a quick burst from 25 yards range, then had to zoom to avoid colliding with the Fokker. Glancing behind him and downwards, he noted only that Wolff was in a vertical dive. McGregor's combat claim was for an 'out of control' victory.

It seems probable that Wolff was killed by MacGregor's bullets in midair and was already dead when his Triplane crashed and burst into flames north of Wervik near Moorslede at 17.30 hours (German time). (Note: British and German times often differed by an hour during the Summer. This may explain the time discrepancy of the reports of the combat.) Wolff's remains were taken back to Memel for burial. His interment in a military ceremony included display of his native Bavaria's Military Merit Order, 4th Class with Swords, in addition to his Prussian awards.

== Awards ==
Before winning the Pour le Merite on 4 May 1917, Kurt Wolff was awarded both classes of the Iron Cross, the House Order of Hohenzollern, and the Bavarian Military Merit Order, Fourth Class with Swords.

== In popular culture ==
Wolff was portrayed by Tino Mewes in the 2008 biopic The Red Baron.

== Victory list ==
Opposing pilots are singly listed as casualties. Double listings are pilot and observer respectively.

No.	Date/time	Victim	Squadron	Location	Casualties
1	6 March 1917 @ 1230 hours	Royal Aircraft Factory B.E.2d	No. 16 Squadron RFC	Givenchy, France	2nd Lts George Milne Underwood, KIA; Albert Edward Watts, KIA
2	9 March 1917 @ 1020 hours	Royal Aircraft Factory F.E.8	No. 40 Squadron RFC	Annay, France	2nd Lt Thomas Aloyims Shepard POW
3	17 March 1917 @ 1145 hours	Sopwith 1 1/2 Strutter	No. 43 Squadron RFC	Southwest of Athies, France	2nd Lts Arthur Leslie Constable, KIA; Charles Duncan Knox, KIA
4	30 March 1917 @ 1145 hours	Nieuport 17	No. 60 Squadron RFC	East of Gavrelle, France	Lt William Patrick Garnett KIA
5	31 March 1917 @ 0750 hours	Royal Aircraft Factory F.E.2b	No. 11 Squadron RFC	Gavrelle, France	Lt Leslie Arthur Trew Strange, POW; 2nd Lt William Gerard Talbot Clifton, POW/died of wounds
6	6 April 1917 @ 1015 hours	Royal Aircraft Factory R.E.8	No. 59 Squadron RFC	Bois-Bernard, France	Lt A. Clayton Pepper, POW; Lt William Leonard Day KIA
7	7 April 1917 @ 1745 hours	Nieuport 27	No. 60 Squadron RFC	Mercatel, France	2nd Lt Charles Sidney Hall, KIA
8	8 April 1917 @ 1430 hours	Airco DH.4	No. 55 Squadron RFC	Northeast of Blécourt, France	Lt Bernard Evans, KIA; 2nd Lt Basil Walwyn White, KIA
9	11 April 1917 @ 0910 hours	Bristol F.2 Fighter	No. 48 Squadron RFC	North of Fismes, France	Cpt David Mary Tidmarsh, POW; 2nd Lt Cator Barclay Holland WIA/POW
10	13 April 1917 @ 0856 hours	Royal Aircraft Factory R.E.8	No. 59 Squadron RFC	North of Vitry, France	Lts Arthur Horace Tanfield, KIA; Andrew Ormerod KIA
11	13 April 1917 @ 1235 hours	Royal Aircraft Factory F.E.2b	No. 11 Squadron RFC	South of Bailleul, France	Lt Charles Eric Robertson and 2nd Lt Horace Denoon Duncan downed uninjured in British lines
12	13 April 1917 @ 1630 hours	Nieuport 17	No. 29 Squadron RFC	South of Monchy, France	2nd Lt Basil Scott-Foxwell
13	13 April 1917 @ 1852 hours	Martinsyde G.100	No. 27 Squadron RFC	Rouvroy	2nd Lt Michael Topham, KIA
14	14 April 1917 @ 0920 hours	Nieuport 17	No. 60 Squadron RFC	Southeast of Drocourt, France	2nd Lt John Herbert Cock, KIA
15	14 April 1917 @ 1829 hours	Spad S.VII	No. 19 Squadron RFC	East of Bailleul, France	Lt Edward Walter Capper, KIA
16	16 April 1917 @ 1030 hours	Nieuport 17	No. 60 Squadron RFC	Northeast of Roeux, France	Lt John MacCreary Elliot, KIA
17	21 April 1917 @ 1730 hours	Royal Aircraft Factory B.E.2g	No. 16 Squadron RFC	West of Willerval, France	Cpt Eric John Dauben Routh, WIA; 2nd Lt Alexander George Riddell Mackenzie unhurt
18	21 April 1917 @ 1745 hours	Nieuport 23	No. 29 Squadron RFC	East of Fresnes, France	2nd Lt Cecil Victor de Burgh Rogers, KIA
19	22 April 1917 @ 1710 hours	Royal Aircraft Factory F.E.2b	No. 11 Squadron RFC	Hendecourt, France	Sgt John Kenneth Hollis, POW; Lt Bernard Joseph Tolhurst, KIA
20	22 April 1917 @ 2005 hours	Morane Parasol	No. 3 Squadron RFC	Havrincourt, France	Lt Frank Leslie Carter, KIA; 2nd Lt Albert Stanley Morgan, KIA
21	26 April 1917 @ 1635 hours	Royal Aircraft Factory B.E.2g	No. 5 Squadron RFC	East of Gavrelle, France	Lt Humphrey Brian Thomasson Hope, KIA; 2nd Lt Lawson Ellis Allan, MIA
22	27 April 1917 @ 2020 hours	Royal Aircraft Factory F.E.2b	No. 11 Squadron RFC	South of Gavrelle, France	2nd Lt Percy Robinson, knocked unconscious; 2nd Class Aero Mechanic H. W. Tilley, injuries unknown
23	28 April 1917 @ 1120 hours	Royal Aircraft Factory B.E.2g	No. 16 Squadron RFC	South of Oppy, Pas-de-Calais, France	2nd Lt John Victor Wischer, WIA/POW; 2nd Lt Arthur Adolf Baerlein WIA/POW
24	29 April 1917 @ 1210 hours	Spad S.VII	No. 19 Squadron RFC	Sailly, France	2nd Lt Norman Carter Buckton, unhurt; 2nd Lt Garth Richard O'Sullivan, unhurt
25	29 April 1917 @ 1700 hours	Royal Aircraft Factory F.E.2b	No. 18 Squadron RFC	South of Pronville-en-Artois, France	Major Hubert Dunsterville Harvey-Kelly, KIA
26	29 April 1917 @ 1745 hours	Royal Aircraft Factory B.E.2f	No. 16 Squadron RFC	West of Gavrelles, France	2nd Lt George Hastings Stone Dinsmore, unhurt; 2nd Lt George Beaumont Bate, KIA
27	30 April 1917 @ 1735 hours	Royal Aircraft Factory B.E.2e	No. 13 Squadron RFC	West of Fresnes, France	2nd Lt Wiiliam Kennedy Trollope, died of wounds; 2nd Lt Augustine Bonner, KIA
28	1 May 1917 @ 1050 hours	Sopwith Triplane	No. 8 (Naval) Squadron, RNAS	South of Seclin	Flight Sub-Lieutenant Edmund Daniel Roach, KIA
29	1 May 1917 @ 1855 hours	Royal Aircraft Factory F.E.2b	No. 25 Squadron RFC	South of Bois Bernard, France	Lt Gerald Sidney French, WIA/POW; Lt Geoffrey Parker Harding, POW
30	13 May 1917 @ 1155 hours	SPAD	Escadrille N.37, Service Aéronautique	Beine, France	Sgt Fernand Albert Garrigou
31	27 June 1917 @ 2030 hours	Nieuport 23	No. 29 Squadron RFC	Southwest of Noyelles	Lt David Charles Graeme Murray, WIA/POW
32	6 July 1917 @ 2120 hours	Royal Aircraft Factory R.E.8	No. 4 Squadron RFC	Zillebeke, Belgium	Lt John Yates Taylor, KIA; Lt George Mutch, KIA
33	7 July 1917 @ 1100 hours	Sopwith Triplane	No. 1 (Naval) Squadron, RNAS	Comines, France	Flight Sub-Lieutenant Kenneth H. Millward, KIA
