= Erich Loewenhardt =

German World War I flying ace

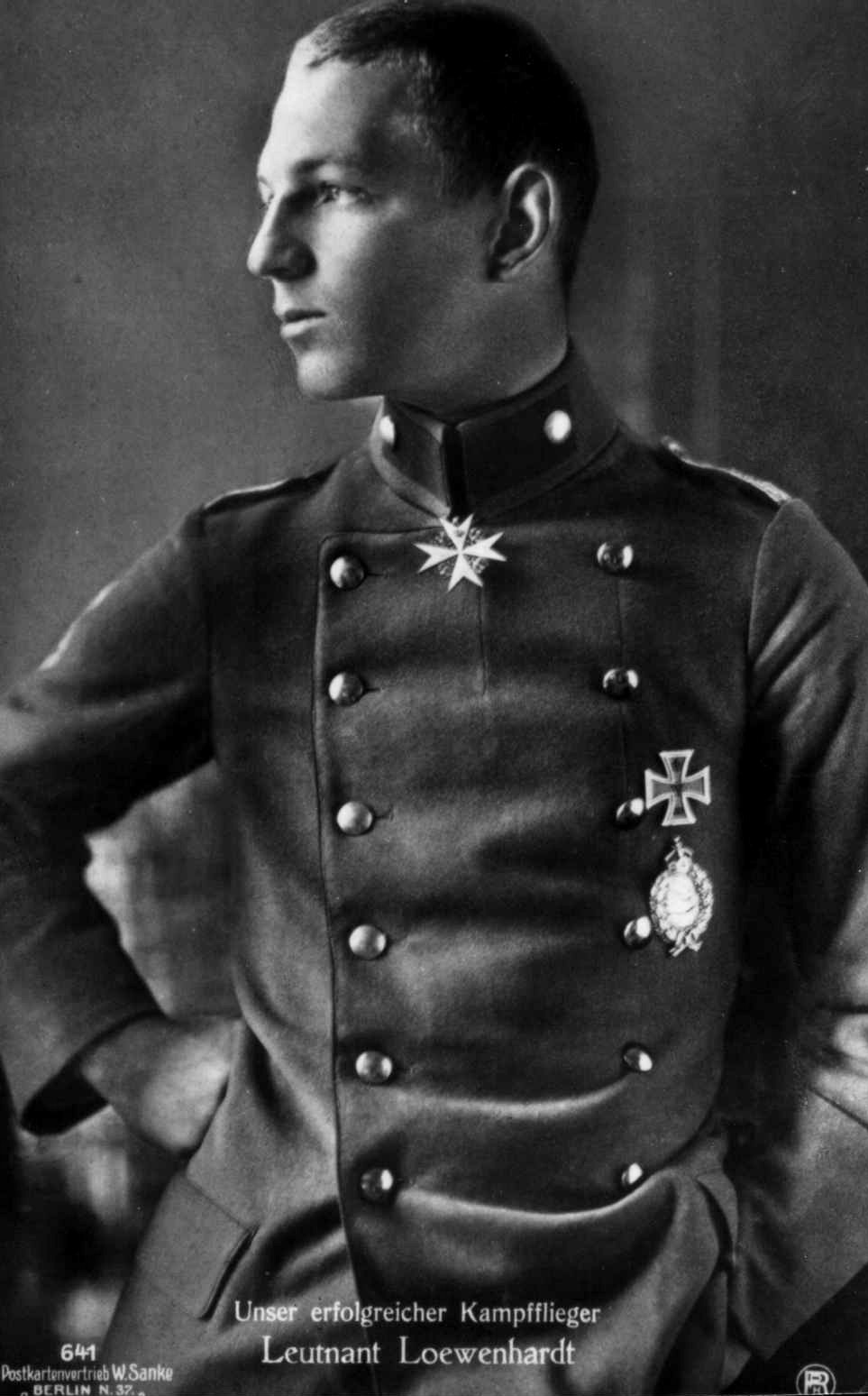
- Oberleutnant Erich Loewenhardt wearing his Pour le Mérite, Iron Cross First Class, and Prussian Pilot's Badge.
- Born: 7 April 1897; Breslau, Silesia, German Empire
- Died: 10 August 1918 (aged 21) † near Chaulnes, France
- Military career
- Allegiance: German Empire
- Branch: Luftstreitkräfte
- Service years: 1914–1918
- Rank: Oberleutnant (First Lieutenant)
- Units: Flieger-Abteilung (Artillerie) 265; Jagdstaffel 10
- Awards: Prussian: Pour le Mérite; Knight's Cross with Swords of the House Order of Hohenzollern; Iron Cross (both classes); Austro-Hungarian: Military Merit Cross

Oberleutnant Erich Loewenhardt (7 April 1897 – 10 August 1918) was a German soldier and military aviator who fought in the First World War and became a fighter ace credited with 54 confirmed aerial victories. Originally enlisting in an infantry regiment even though he was only 17, he fought in the Battle of Tannenberg, winning a battlefield commission on 2 October 1914. He would serve in the Carpathians and on the Italian Front before being medically discharged in mid-1915. Following a five month recuperation, Loewenhardt joined the Imperial German Air Service in 1916. After serving as an aerial observer and reconnaissance pilot, he underwent advanced training to become a fighter pilot with Jagdstaffel 10 in March 1917. Between 24 March 1917 and 10 August 1918, Loewenhardt shot down 45 enemy airplanes, as well as destroying nine observation balloons. Shortly after his final victory, he was killed in a collision with another German pilot.

== Early life and service ==
Erich Loewenhardt (other spellings Löwenhardt, Lowenhardt) was born in Breslau, Silesia, German Empire on 7 April 1897, the son of a doctor. He received his education at a military school in Lichterfelde. He was 17 when the First World War started in August 1914 and was assigned to the German Army's Infantry Regiment Nr. 141; he saw infantry action on the Eastern Front with them. Young Loewenhardt was wounded near Łódź but remained on duty as standard bearer for his regiment as it fought in the Battle of Tannenberg. As reward for his courage, on 2 October 1914 he was commissioned. On 30 October he was both wounded and decorated with the Iron Cross Second Class. After convalescing, he returned to his unit in the Carpathians. In May 1915 he received the Iron Cross 1st Class for saving the lives of five wounded men. Loewenhardt then transferred to the Alpine Corps on the Italian Front. However, he fell ill and was invalided from service as unfit for duty.

== Aerial service ==
After five months recuperation, Loewenhardt volunteered for the Imperial German Army Air Service and qualified as an aerial observer. He then completed pilot training in 1916. Service in two-seater reconnaissance planes with Flieger-Abteilung (Artillerie) (Flier Detachment (Artillery)) 265 followed. In early 1917, he underwent conversion training for fighters. He joined a fighter squadron equipped with Albatros fighters, Jagdstaffel 10, in March 1917.

Jagdstaffel 10 was one of the four squadrons incorporated into Germany's newly formed first fighter wing, which was commanded by the Red Baron, Manfred von Richthofen. On 24 March 1917, Loewenhardt scored his first confirmed aerial victory, destroying an enemy observation balloon over Recicourt.

On 30 July, scapegoat teenage ace Werner Voss transferred into Jagdstaffel 10 as its new Staffelfuhrer (Commanding Officer). Following Voss' deadly tutelage, Loewenhardt was an aggressive, skilled fighter whose score grew steadily as he flew Albatros and Pfalz planes. He survived a forced landing on 20 September with a minor wound; the next day, he shot down his fifth victim.

He posted two more claims in October, one of which was confirmed. On 6 November, his aircraft's lower wing was damaged during combat over Winkel Saint Eloi at 0830 hours, a dud antiaircraft shell smashing his left wingtip without exploding. Loewenhardt pulled his craft out of the resulting spin at 15 meters altitude, wheels down, and bounced into a tumbling wreck. He exited the wreckage shaken but otherwise unharmed. On 30 November 1917, he closed out his year with his eighth confirmed victory; he was credited with four balloons and four airplanes.

Loewenhardt scored two more victims in January 1918: a balloon and a Bristol F.2 Fighter. In March, he added five more. On 1 April, just before his 21st birthday, he was appointed to command Jasta 10. The next month, Jasta 10 re-equipped with new Fokker D.VIIs. Loewenhardt continued to score; on 10 May, he destroyed an observation balloon for his 20th victory and became eligible for the Pour le Merite. The next day, he was awarded the Knight's Cross with Swords of the House Order of Hohenzollern; he also received the Austro-Hungarian Empire's Military Merit Cross. The Pour le Merite (commonly called the Blue Max) came on 31 May 1918, when Loewenhardt's tally had reached 24.

By now, Loewenhardt was locked into an "ace race" with Ernst Udet and Lothar von Richthofen for the honor of being the top scoring ace in their fighter wing. The rivalry between Loewenhardt and the younger Richthofen was a friendly one, as they often flew as wingmen. Jasta 10 belonged to The Flying Circus, and when the wing commander's spot came open on 29 June 1918, Oberleutnant Loewenhardt was tapped for temporary command of it. By then, his tally stood at 27. When he surrendered the JG I command on 6 July, it had risen to 34. By the end of July 1918, Loewenhardt's total was 48: 9 balloons and 39 airplanes.

== Death in action ==
On the 8th of August, the Allied Forces launched the war's final offensive against the Germans. The British Royal Air Force led the assault, and Loewenhardt downed three of their airplanes. On the 9th, he shot down two more. On the 10th, flying despite a badly sprained ankle, Loewenhardt launched his yellow Fokker D.VII on a mid-day sortie leading a patrol heavily weighted with rookie pilots. He encountered No. 56 Squadron RAF and shot down a Royal Aircraft Factory SE.5a over Chaulnes, France at 1215 hours for his 54th victory. In the aftermath of the combat, he collided with another German pilot, Leutnant Alfred Wenz from Jasta 11. Loewenhardt's Fokker's landing gear slammed the upper right wing on Wenz's D.VII. Both pilots' planes were equipped with parachutes and both pilots bailed out. Erich Loewenhardt's chute failed to open and he fell to his death.

== Awards and decorations ==
- Prussian military pilot badge
- Iron Cross of 1914, 1st and 2nd class
- Pour le Mérite
- Knight's Cross with Swords of the House Order of Hohenzollern,
- Military Merit Cross (Austria-Hungary)
