= Wilhelm Reinhard =

Wilhelm Reinhard may refer to:

- Wilhelm Reinhard (pilot), World War I German fighter pilot
- Wilhelm Reinhard (SS), German officer of the Schutzstaffel
- Wilhelm Reinhard (theologian) (1860-1922), German theologian
