= Norman MacGregor =

British air force officer (1896–1981)

Norman Miers MacGregor
- Born: 29 May 1896; Chiswick, London, England
- Died: 1981 (aged 84–85); Plymouth, Devon, England
- Military career
- Allegiance: United Kingdom
- Branch: Royal Navy; Royal Air Force
- Service years: 1916–1919; 1921
- Rank: Flight Lieutenant
- Units: No. 6 Squadron RNAS; No. 10 Squadron RNAS/No. 210 Squadron RAF
- Awards: Distinguished Service Cross

Norman Miers MacGregor DSC (29 May 1896 – 1981) was a British World War I flying ace credited with seven aerial victories, including over German ace Kurt Wolff.

== Military service ==
MacGregor entered the RNAS as a probationary flight sub-lieutenant (temporary), assigned to HMS President, on 12 February 1916, and was commissioned as a flight sub-lieutenant, with seniority from 12 February, on 25 July.

Assigned to No. 6 (Naval) Squadron in France, flying the Sopwith Camel, MacGregor gained his first aerial victory on 28 June 1917 when he and Flight Sub-Lieutenant F. C. Winter destroyed a DFW Type C reconnaissance aircraft. On 17 August MacGregor, alongside Flight Commander Bruno De Roeper and Flight Sub-Lieutenant R. E. Carroll, were credited with driving down out of control an Aviatik Type C reconnaissance aircraft east of Westende. MacGregor and De Roeper drove down an Albatros D.V over Moere on 20 August, and on the 22nd MacGregor destroyed an Albatros D.III solo north of St. Pierre Chapelle.

MacGregor then transferred to No. 10 (Naval) Squadron, where on 15 September 1917 in a dogfight over Moorslede with aircraft from Jasta 11 he shot down the first Fokker Dr.I of the war, killing the pilot Kurt Wolff.

He was promoted to flight lieutenant on 2 October, and on 10 December he and Flight Sub-Lieutenant J. G. Clark destroyed an Albatros D.V over Oostnieuwkerke.

In February 1918, MacGregor was awarded the Distinguished Service Cross. His citation read:

Flight Lieutenant (Acting Flight Commander) Norman Miers MacGregor, RNAS.

"In recognition of his skill and courage in aerial combats. On the 12th December 1917, whilst leading his flight on an offensive sweep, he encountered a body of six Albatross scouts at 14,000 feet. In the general fight which ensued he attacked a scout which was engaging one of our machines and drove it down out of control, and it was seen to crash. Act. Flt.-Cdr. Macgregor has destroyed several enemy machines and has led his flight with great dash and judgment".

On 1 April 1918, the Royal Naval Air Service was merged with the Army's Royal Flying Corps (RFC) to form the Royal Air Force, and No. 10 (Naval) Squadron became No. 210 Squadron RAF. A few months later, on 12 August, MacGregor gained his seventh and final victory by driving down another Albatros D.V east of Diksmuide.

MacGregor was transferred to RAF's unemployed list on 10 January 1919 at the rank of captain. However, he was temporarily restored to the active list as a flight lieutenant on 10 April 1921, serving until 5 June.
