= Jagdgeschwader 1 =

Jagdgeschwader 1 may refer to one of two German military units:

- Jagdgeschwader 1 (World War I), a unit of the Luftstreitkräfte commanded by Manfred von Richthofen (the Red Baron), also known as Jagdgeschwader 1 Flying Circus
- Jagdgeschwader 1 (World War II), also known as Jagdgeschwader 1 Oesau after its Wing Commander, Walter Oesau
