= Jagdgeschwader I (World War I) =

Fighter wing of the German airforce

Fighter Wing 1
- Jagdgeschwader I
- Country: German Empire also known as Deutsches Reich
- Branch: Luftstreitkräfte

Jagdgeschwader I (JG I) of World War I, was a fighter wing of the German Luftstreitkräfte, comprising four Jastas (fighter squadrons). The first unit of its type formed under that classification, JG I was formed on 24 June 1917, with Manfred von Richthofen as commanding officer, by combining Jastas 4, 6, 10 and 11. JG I became known as "The Flying Circus" (German: Der Fliegende Zirkus) or "Richthofen's Circus" because of the bright colours of its aircraft, and perhaps also because of the way the unit was transferred from one area of Allied air activity to another – moving like a travelling circus in trains, and frequently setting up in tents on improvised airfields.

== Formation ==
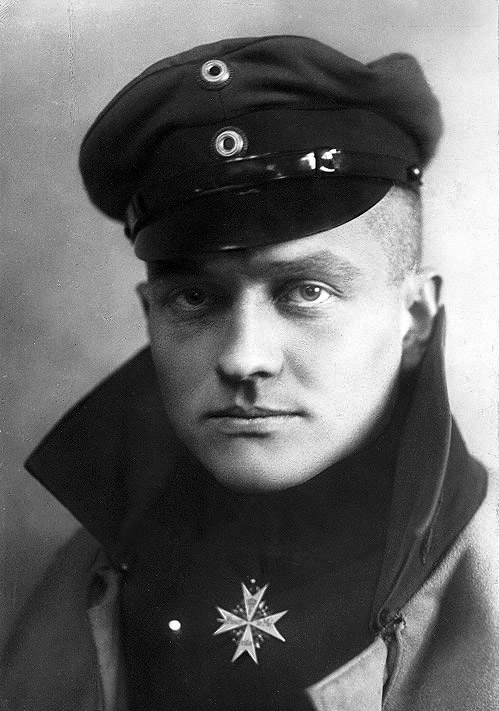
Rittmeister Manfred von Richthofen

Lothar von Richthofen

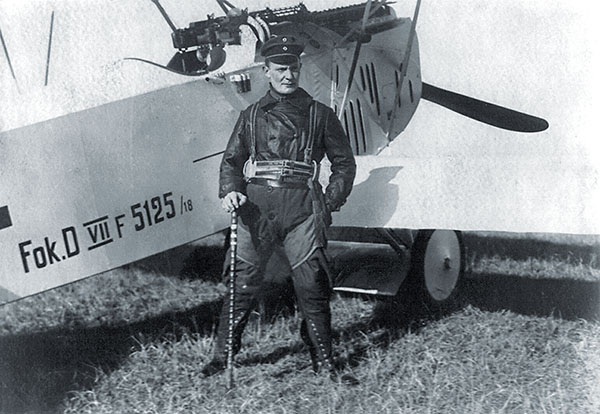
Hermann Goering commander of Jagdgeschwader I (World War I) beside his Fokker DVII 5125/1918. He holds a walking stick "Geschwader Stock" that had been owned by The Red Baron Manfred von Richthofen.

During early 1917, it became apparent to the German High Command that they would always be outnumbered in air operations over the Western Front. The average Jasta could only muster some six or eight aircraft in total for a patrol, and would often face one Allied formation after another. In order to maintain some impact and local command of the air the Jastas began (unofficially) to fly in larger, composite groups. By mid 1917 the first official grouping of Jastas saw JG I formed. Its role was simple; to achieve localized air superiority wherever it was sent and to deny Allied air operations over a specific location. The unit was thus highly mobile, and JG I and its supporting logistical infrastructure traveled to wherever local air superiority was needed, often at short notice.

Initially based at Marke (Jasta 11), Kuurne (Jasta 4), Bissegem (Jasta 6) and Heule (Jasta 10), Richthofen had carte blanche to select his unit commanders and recruit individual pilots into JG I, and alternately to transfer out any pilots he did not feel were up to standard. Thus 9-victory ace Leutnant Eduard Ritter von Dostler and the rising Leutnant Hans von Adam were soon posted to Jasta 6, and Lieutenant Werner Voss into Jasta 10. This policy had the effect of making the Jagdgeschwader an elite unit, but robbing lesser Jastas of their best pilots also reduced the overall standard of the average unit. JG I itself suffered a dilution of talent when competent members were posted away to command their own Jastas in late 1917, when the number of Jastas were doubled from 40 to 80.

== Operations 1917 ==
JG I was soon flying intensively over the Flanders battlefield above the Allied offensive started in June 1917.

Richthofen was severely wounded in the head on 6 July, leading elements of JG I in combat with F.E.2d's of the Royal Flying Corps's No. 20 Squadron. Oberleutnant Kurt-Bertram von Döring, Commanding Officer of Jasta 4, took over temporary command and Jastas 4 and 11 shot down nine Allied aircraft the next day. Richthofen reassumed command on 25 July, but left on a period of convalescence leave on 6 September.

JG I was the first unit to operationally provide a trial of the new Fokker Dr.I triplane (as the Fokker F.I), the first two examples of which were received on 21 August 1917. Jasta 10's Werner Voss would be the triplane's greatest exponent, scoring 10 victories with it in just 21 days before his death in combat.

Richthofen returned to JG I on 23 October, and around this time a number of fatal crashes involving the Fokker Dr.I saw JG I Technical Officer Lt. Konstantin Krefft ground the unit's triplanes until modifications were carried out in early December. The unit meantime soldiered on with the Albatros D.V..

JG I was rushed from Ypres to Cambrai by 23 November 1917, following the launch of the British offensive, and did much to stabilise the air war over the battlefield when the bad weather permitted.

By the end of 1917 the success of Jagdgeschwader I meant several other similar formations were then formed in February 1918, with Jagdgeschwader II operating against both the French and the British and Jagdgeschwader III on the Ypres front. At this time Richthofen recruited Hans Kirchstein and Fritz Friedrichs from two-seater units, and Ernst Udet from Jasta 37.

== 1918 ==
Poor weather in early 1918 saw little opportunity for JG I to score, although the unit were in the forefront of defensive fighter operations during the major German offensive launched on 21 March 1918. By April 1918 the formation was flying from Harbonnieres, the most south westerly airfield they were to ultimately occupy. The newly formed RFC (Royal Flying Corps) however maintained a degree of air superiority, with heavily escorted artillery observation and reconnaissance two-seaters operating effectively over the rapidly moving ground battle below. Most of JG I's victims at this time were the low flying fighter bombers, particularly Sopwith Camels.

After von Richthofen's death in April 1918, Hauptmann Wilhelm Reinhard became JG I Commanding Officer. On 10 May JG I claimed its 300th victory while on 20 May the unit received the honorary title of JG I 'Richthofen'. Soon after JG I moved to the 7th Army front to support the forthcoming Aisne offensive, commencing on 27 May. JG I moved to Guise, and then Puiseux Ferme, operating primarily against the French and the newly arrived American Air Forces. Between 31 May and 8 June JG I claimed some 43 French aircraft and balloons, and another 24 between 24 June and 28 June. Jasta 6's Lt. Hans Kirschstein was the star performer of JG I at this time, claiming 27 victories between 18 March and 14 June.

By mid-June JG I was fully equipped with the Fokker D.VII, the first having been tested operationally in late May by Jasta 10. After Reinhard was killed in a flying accident on 3 July 1918, Oberleutnant Hermann Göring became JG I's third and last commander of the war on 14 July.

The Geschwader moved again on 19 July to Soissons, claiming its 500th victory on 25 July. Yet another move followed on 10 August, to the 2nd Army front west of Saint-Quentin. JG I's then top scorer, 53-kill Leutnant Erich Loewenhardt, was killed in an air collision on this day.

Having been subjected to intensive operations over the Amiens battle in August 1918, by mid-September an exhausted JG I was withdrawn from the British part of the front, having lost all four Jasta commanders by the end of August; Lowenhardt of Jasta 10 was killed, Jasta 6's Co Lt. Paul Wenzel and Lothar von Richthofen of Jasta 11 both wounded and hospitalised, and Lt. Ernst Udet (Jasta 4) exhausted and sent on leave. JG I scored just 17 claims during September, despite the month seeing the highest losses for the Allied Air Forces of the war (The Jasta force claiming some 721 victories for the month). For the next three months the likes of Leutnant Friedrich Noltenius in Jasta 11, Jasta 6's Commanding Officer Ulrich Neckel, and Leutnant Arthur Laumann (Jasta 10) did the majority of the scoring.

Thereafter until the end of the war shortages of fuel and spares, increasing Allied numerical air superiority and continual retreats in the face of Allied ground advances meant JG I struggled to emulate earlier successes.

From June 1917 until November 1918, JG I claimed 644 Allied aircraft destroyed, while losing 52 pilots killed in action and 67 wounded.

== Notable pilots ==
- Eduard Ritter von Dostler – 26 victories
- Friedrich Friedrichs – 21 victories including 10 observation balloons
- Hermann Göring – 22 victories
- Arthur Laumann – 28 victories
- Erich Loewenhardt – 54 victories and the third highest scoring German ace of the First World War
- Friedrich T. Noltenius – 21 victories
- Wilhelm Reinhard – 20 victories
- Lothar von Richthofen – 40 victories
- Manfred von Richthofen – the Red Baron, with 80 victories highest scoring ace of any nation in the First World War
- Wolfram von Richthofen – 8 victories
- Ernst Udet – 62 victories and the second highest scoring German ace of the First World War
- Werner Voss – 48 victories
- Hans Weiss – 16 victories
- Kurt Wolff – 33 victories

== See also ==
- Jasta 11
- Taktisches Luftwaffengeschwader 71 "Richthofen"
- Luftstreitkräfte
- Luftwaffe
