= Hans Weiss (aviator) =

German World War I flying ace (1892-1918)

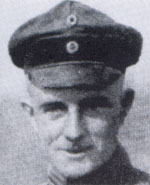
- Born: 19 April 1892; Hof, Germany
- Died: 2 May 1918 (aged 26); Méricourt
- Burial place: Cappy, Somme, France
- Military career
- Allegiance: German Empire
- Branch: Luftstreitkräfte
- Rank: Leutnant
- Units: Flieger-Abteilung (Artillerie) 282, Flieger-Abteilung (Artillerie) 28, Flieger-Abteilung (Artillerie) 68, Jagdstaffel 41, Jagdstaffel 10
- Commands: Jagdstaffel 11
- Awards: Royal House Order of Hohenzollern, Iron Cross

Leutnant Hans Weiss was a German World War I flying ace credited with 16 aerial victories.

== Early life and service ==
Born on 19 April 1892, Weiss was a native of Hof, a Bavarian town on the Austrian/German border. He began school in Bayreuth in 1912, studying mechanical engineering. After several attempts to volunteer for service at the beginning of World War I, he was accepted by the pioneers at Ingolstadt. He trained in Darmstadt in 1916; one of his schoolmates from high school, Richard Wenzl, trained with him there and would also become an ace.

Weiss began his aerial service as an observer gunner in artillery cooperation units FA(A) 282, FA(A) 28, and FA(A) 68 during June 1916. At that time, he was a corporal. During a reconnaissance flight, he was wounded in the foot by anti-aircraft fire while flying at nearly 9,000 feet. Upon recovery, he was awarded the Iron Cross Second Class. On a later mission, on 26 May 1917, he bombed an enemy supply train, breaking it in half; he then continued the attack despite ground fire from machine guns and infantry. He won the Iron Cross First Class and was promoted to sergeant for this feat.

== Service as a fighter pilot ==
Then, in August 1917, he was sent to Jastashule in Valenciennes. By the following month, he was already flying a fighter for Royal Prussian Jagdstaffel 41; he scored his first victory on the 17th. Weiss was then commissioned a leutnant in October 1917. He then went on a streak as a balloon buster, downing four observation balloons in a row. Weiss followed that with four triumphs over enemy aircraft, the last of which, his tenth win, occurred on 13 March 1918. He was transferred to Royal Prussian Jasta 10, part of Manfred von Richthofen's "Flying Circus", Jagdgeschwader 1. He scored a single victory there, on 28 March 1918, before being transferred to another Flying Circus unit, Royal Prussian Jasta 11, as a Flight Leader. He scored his first win in his new unit on 2 April 1918. Six days later, he was selected to command Jasta 11 temporarily and did so until he died in action on 2 May 1918.

On that day, Weiss was flying his Fokker Triplane; although Richthofen's Jagdgruppe used scarlet as their identifying color, Weiss's plane was largely or entirely "Weiss" (white). Weiss died of a bullet through the head from the guns of No. 209 Squadron's Lt. Merrill Samuel Taylor's Sopwith Camel while attacking another Camel from Taylor's unit.
