= Willi Gabriel =

World War I flying ace

Willi Eduard Gabriel
- Born: 31 December 1893; Bromberg, Posen, German Empire (present-day Poland)
- Died: 1 June 1968 (aged 74); West Berlin, Germany
- Relatives: Walter (brother)
- Military career
- Allegiance: Germany
- Branch: Luftstreitkräfte; Luftwaffe
- Rank: Vizefeldwebel (later Hauptmann)
- Units: Flieger-Abteilung 34; Flieger-Abteilung 21; Flieger-Abteilung 44; Flieger-Abteilung 207; Schutzstaffel 15; Jagdstaffel 11
- Awards: Iron Cross
- Other work: Stunt flying in movies

Willi Eduard Gabriel was a German World War I flying ace credited with eleven aerial victories. Hermann Göring removed Gabriel from combat duty for shooting four enemy airplanes contrary to orders.

== Early life ==
Willi Gabriel was one of twins born on 31 December 1893 in Bromberg, German Empire (present-day Poland). Gabriel built his own airplanes prior to World War I.

== World War I service ==
Willi Gabriel was called up for military service when the war began. Early in 1915, he began a series of assignments to artillery cooperation units, often in company with his twin brother Walter. The twins served together until Walter was shot down and captured on 19 August 1917. Willi was eventually stationed in Schutzstaffel 15, where he and his observer shot down a Spad on 22 March 1918. Wilhelm Reinhard then requested Gabriel's assignment to Jagdgruppe 1, and Gabriel was posted to Jagdstaffel 11 on 15 April as a fighter pilot. He scored on 19 May, then six times in June, including two observation balloons. Hermann Göring then came to command JG 1, much to Gabriel's displeasure. On 18 July 1918, Gabriel flew a solo mission without permission and shot down three French airplanes. Upon his return, he was grounded. However, he disobeyed Göring's orders, took off, and shot down a fourth Frenchman. Upon his return from this sortie, he was banished from combat despite his success. In August 1918, he was posted out of Jasta 11 and away from combat duty despite his previously having won the Iron Cross First Class.

== Post World War I ==
In 1938, Gabriel flew Fokker Dr.I in two movies, DIII 88 and Pour le Mérite. He returned to duty during World War II, rising to the rank of Hauptmann.

== Legacy ==
The Fokker D-VII built by Cole Palen, which flew in the Rhinebeck Aerodrome shows of the 1960s and 1970s, was painted in the scheme of Willi Gabriel, in tribute to him.
