= Sebastian Festner =

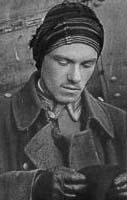
- Second awardee of the Member's Cross of the House Order of Hohenzollern
- Born: 30 June 1894; Holzkirchen, Bavaria
- Died: 25 April 1917 (aged 22); Between Gavrelle and Bailleul, France
- Military career
- Allegiance: German Empire
- Branch: Aviation
- Rank: Vizefeldwebel
- Units: Flieger Abtleilung Nr. 1; Flieger Abtleilung Nr. 7b; Fliegerersatz-Abteilung 2b; Fliegerersatz-Abteilung 5b; Flieger-Abteilung 18; Flieger-Abteilung 5; Jagdstaffel 11
- Awards: Royal House Order of Hohenzollern; Iron Cross First and Second Class

Vizefeldwebel Sebastian Festner (30 June 1894 – 25 April 1917) was an air ace of the Luftstreitkräfte (German Air Force) during World War I, with 12 victories. He was only the second awardee of the Member's Cross of the House Order of Hohenzollern.

== Early life and service ==
Festner was born in Holzkirchen, Kingdom of Bavaria, on 30 June 1894. He originally served with, and was wounded with, the infantry before switching to aviation. He was a mechanic with Flieger Abtleilung Nr. 1 in October 1914. Posted to Flieger Abtleilung Nr. 7b in February 1915 as a Gefreiter, Festner learned to fly unofficially, and then underwent training with Fliegerersatz-Abteilung 2b and Fliegerersatz-Abteilung 5b.

He served briefly with two seater units Flieger-Abteilung 18 and Flieger-Abteilung 5b, arriving at FA 18 on 10 September 1916 and FA 5b five days later. His next posting was to Jagdstaffel 11 on 10 November 1916.

Under the command of Manfred von Richthofen, Festner quickly claimed 2 victories in February 1917 (A BE-2 on 5 February and a FE-8 of No.40 Squadron on 16 February) before claiming another 10 during 'Bloody April'.

== 'Bloody April' ==
A combat with No. 57 Squadron RFC Royal Aircraft Factory FE.2d's over Neuville on 2 April 1917 resulted in Festner claiming a FE-2d (Lt. H.P. Sworder, KIA and 2/Lt. A.H. Margoliouth, POW). On 5 April, during a combat between five Jasta 11 aircraft and six aircraft of No. 48 Squadron RFC, he forced down in captivity the Bristol F.2 Fighter of Captain Leefe Robinson, a Victoria Cross holder, holing his engine: his observer, 2/Lt. E.D. Warburton, was also captured. A Nieuport 17 of No. 60 Squadron was also claimed, but not credited, on 5 April (possibly Lt. E.J.D. Townsend, POW ).

A 'Sopwith' was claimed on 7 April (actually a Bristol Fighter of No. 48 Sqn which force-landed with a dead observer) while on 8 April Festner himself force-landed his Albatros D.II (serial 223/16) with a cracked wing spar, which occurred while in combat with Nieuport 17s of No. 60 Squadron RFC, including future ace Lt. William 'Billy' Bishop. Von Richthofen had the damaged fighter written off strength.

Festner shot down a BE-2d of 13 Sqn. RFC, ( Lt. E.R. Gunner, WIA and Lt. C. Curtiss) on 11 April, while on 13 April Jasta 11, Festner included, shot down an entire six-aircraft flight of Royal Aircraft Factory RE.8s from No. 59 Squadron RFC, Festner accounting for the RE-8 of Lt. A. Watson and 2/Lt. E.P. Law (both POW). He later claimed a FE-2b of No. 25 Squadron (Sgt. J. Dempsey KIA and 2/Lt. W.H. Green, POW).

A Nieuport 17 of No. 60 Squadron was claimed both on 14 April (2/Lt. L.C. Chapman KIA) and 16 April 1917 (Lt. T. Langwill KIA). On 23 April 1917, having previously won both classes of the Iron Cross, Sebastian Festner became only the second recipient of the Member's Cross with Swords of the House Order of Hohenzollern.

== Death in action ==
Flying Albatros D.III (serial 2251/17), Festner was killed in action on 25 April 1917, near Oppy. Exact details are unknown; he was either struck by ground fire, suffered a broken propeller, or shot down attacking a Sopwith 1½ Strutter crewed by Lt. C. R. O'Brien & gunner 2/Lt. J. L. Dickson of No. 43 Squadron RFC, who claimed a red Albatros as their 3rd and 2nd victories respectively. Festner crashed behind the British lines, between Gavrelle and Bailleul. With the area under German artillery fire, there was no attempt to recover either plane or body. Festner was therefore declared missing in action with no known grave.
