= Erich Rüdiger von Wedel =

German flying ace (1892–1954)

Oberleutnant Erich Rüdiger von Wedel
- Born: 9 March 1892; Neuwedell, present day Poland
- Died: 2 July 1954 (aged 62); Salzhausen, near Lüneburg
- Military career
- Allegiance: Germany
- Branch: Imperial German Air Service
- Rank: Oberleutnant
- Unit: Jagdstaffel 11
- Commands: Jagdstaffel 11
- Awards: Royal House Order of Hohenzollern, Iron Cross

Oberleutnant Erich Rüdiger von Wedel (1892–1954) was a German World War I flying ace credited with thirteen aerial victories. Additionally, he spent most of the time from 2 May 1918 until the war's end on 11 November 1918 as commander of Jagdstaffel 11.

== Aerial service ==
Wedel joined Jagdstaffel 11 on 23 April 1918. On 2 May, he took temporary command of the squadron. He shot down eight enemy fighters between 10 May and 21 July. On the latter date, he gave up command of the squadron for a few days. He reassumed command on 27 July and held it until 13 August. On 31 August, he took command for the final time, until war's end. By the time that occurred, he had won the Royal House Order of Hohenzollern and Iron Cross First Class on 29 September, and wrapped up his victory tally with his thirteenth win on 5 November 1918.
