= Friedrich Noltenius =

German flying ace

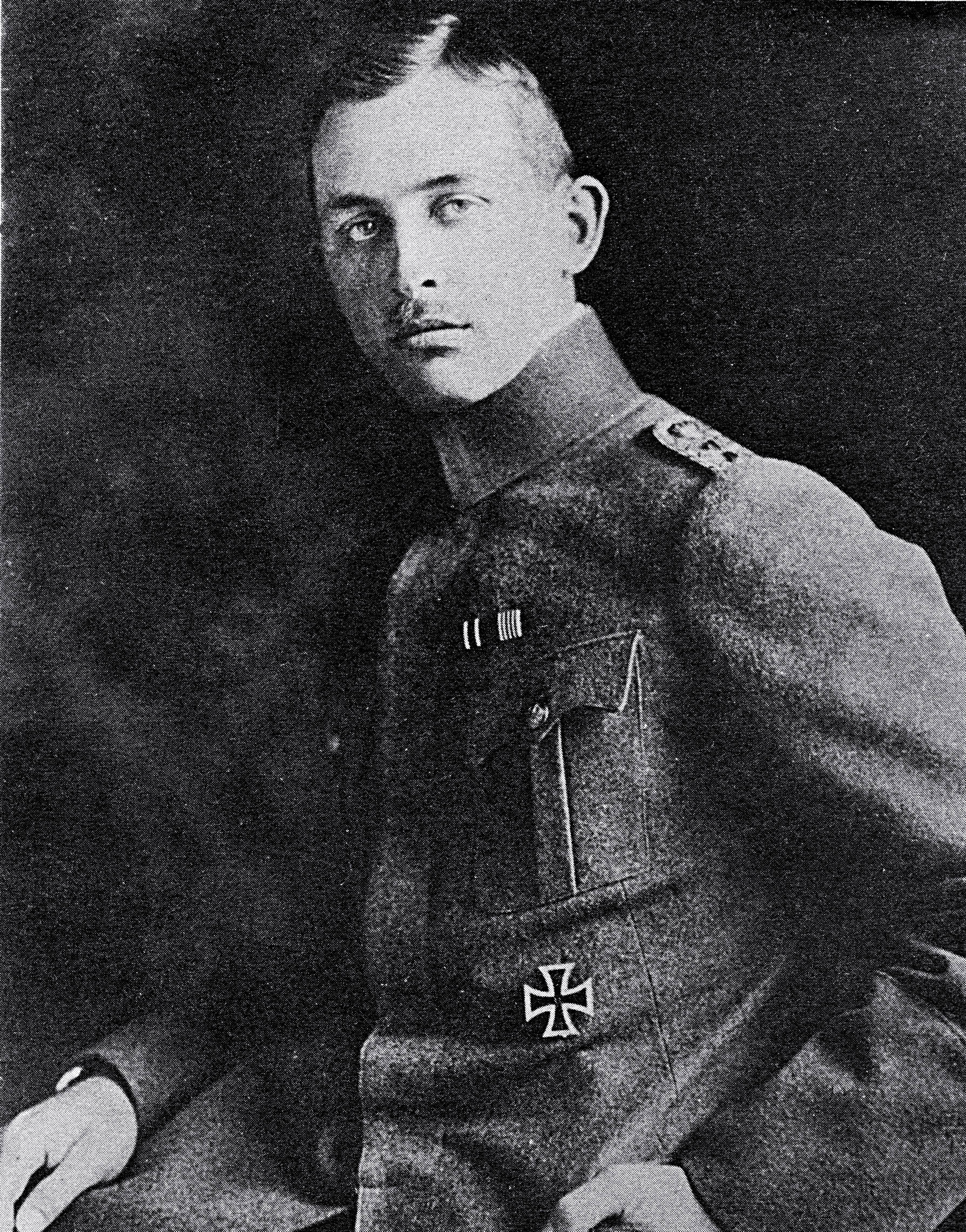
- Leutnant Friedrich Noltenius
- Born: 8 January 1894; Bremen, Germany
- Died: 12 March 1936 (aged 42); Johannisthal Air Field, near Berlin
- Military career
- Allegiance: Germany
- Branch: Artillery; Luftstreitkräfte
- Service years: 1914 – 1918
- Rank: Leutnant
- Nickname: Fritz
- Units: Flieger-Abteilung (Artillerie) 234; Jagdstaffel 27; Jagdstaffel 6; Jagdstaffel 11
- Awards: Prussia: Royal House Order of Hohenzollern; Iron Cross Second and First Class; Württemberg: Military Merit Order

Leutnant Friedrich Theodor Noltenius (8 January 1894 – 12 March 1936) was a German flying ace during the First World War, with a total of 21 official victories. From July 1914 to July 1917, he served with distinction as an artilleryman. He transferred to the Luftstreitkräfte (Imperial German Air Force) and became a fighter pilot. After his aerial combat career began with a horrifying incident, Noltenius began shooting down enemy observation balloons and airplanes on 10 August 1918. His battle claims were sometimes unsuccessfully disputed with other pilots, including his commanding officers. Despite the resulting transfers between units, Noltenius continued his success, being credited with his 21st victory on 4 November 1918. Only the war's end a week later barred him from receiving Germany's highest award for valor, the Pour le Mérite.

Noltenius became a medical doctor after the war ended. He married and moved to South America. After his return to Germany in 1933, he died in a flying accident.

== Early life and service ==
Friedrich Theodor Noltenius was born in Bremen on 8 January 1894, the son of a professor of medicine. The younger Noltenius graduated from high school in Bremen. The beginning of World War I then interrupted his university medical studies.

Noltenius enlisted in the Kingdom of Württemberg's Field Artillery Regiment No. 13 at the outbreak of war, on 4 August 1914. He served on the Eastern Front from November through December 1914 before transferring to the Western Front in France. On 17 November 1915, he was awarded the Iron Cross Second Class. He received the Iron Cross First Class on 10 May 1917. He was commissioned as an officer in October 1916 and was wounded on 16 April 1917. He was awarded Württemberg's Knight's Cross of the Military Merit Order on 5 July 1917.

== Aerial service ==
=== In the beginning ===
While it is unknown when Noltenius transferred to flying service in the Luftstreitkräfte (Imperial German Air Force), he began ground school on 3 November 1917. In February 1918, he began actual flight training. By early June, he was flying his first artillery direction missions with Flieger-Abteilung (Artillerie) 234 (Flier Detachment (Artillery) 234). Shortly thereafter, he was sent to fighter training in late June. Upon graduation, he was assigned to Royal Prussian Jagdstaffel 27, one of the fighter squadrons of Bruno Loerzer's Jagdgeschwader III wing.

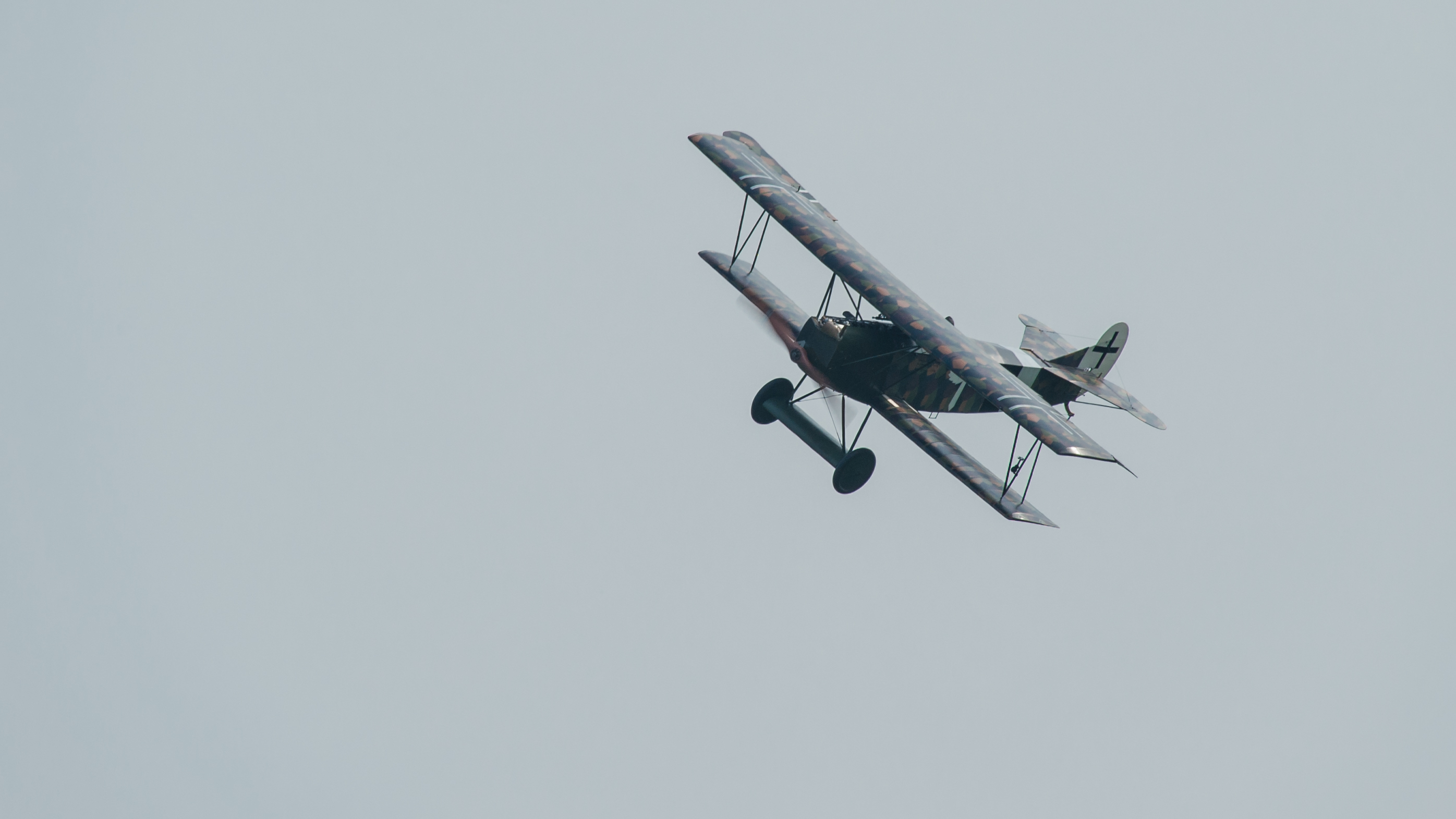
Noltenius' weapon was a Fokker D.VII.

Once he received his assigned Fokker D.VII, he had his personal insignia painted on it. He chose an elaborate display of red and white, with checkerboards and stripes both encircling the fuselage in a wide band and painted on the upper wing above the cockpit. His sister's name, Hertha, was on the side of the cockpit.

=== First kill ===
On 16 July, an exceptionally hot spell of weather settled in—so hot that it sometimes detonated incendiary bullets within aircraft cockpits with fatal results. During a two-day stretch, at least seven German airplanes were lost to ammunition cooking off. Flying in this killing weather, Noltenius found himself one of three German pilots attacking a French Breguet 14 on the 18th. As he wrote in his diary:

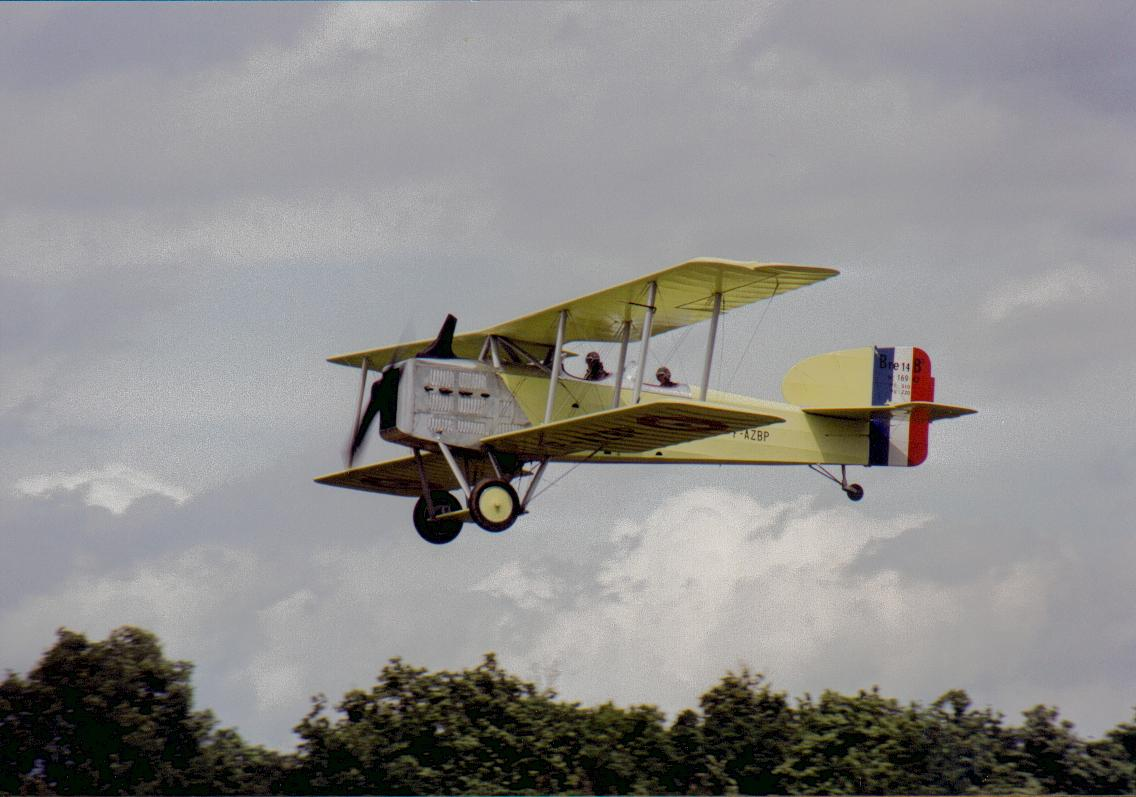
Noltenius' first air combat was with a Bréguet XIV.

"Alternately, I was over him or under him and behind him...anyway, at an altitude of 2500 metres I took good aim and pressed the trigger. Then a body broke free of the seat and the observer fell out. It was an abominable sight, and I can only say that I was extremely sorry for the poor devil....

The horror of his machine gunning the observer to death was compounded by his commanding officer, after they landed. According to him, unseen by Noltenius, the French pilot had futilely raised his arms to surrender. Also, Noltenius' combat claim for this victory was denied; the credit was given to another pilot.

=== A string of victories ===
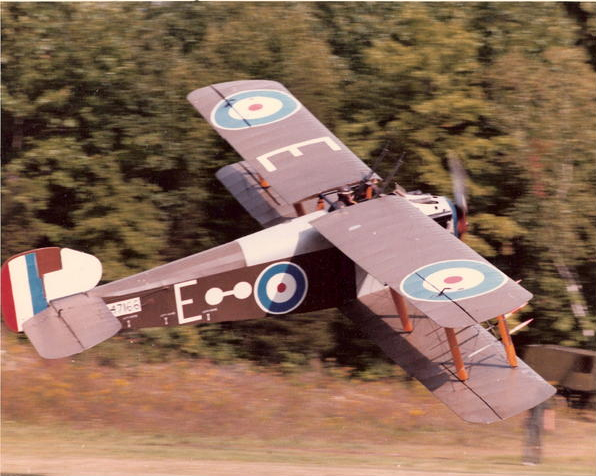
A Sopwith Dolphin was Noltenius' first confirmed victim.

On 3 August 1918, Noltenius pushed through drizzly weather to unsuccessfully attack a drenched enemy observation balloon. Noltenius chalked the failure up to experience. His first victory was over a Sopwith Dolphin, on 10 August. His second, ten days later, initiated him into the ranks of balloon busters as he destroyed an observation balloon. As his victories continued, on 2 September, he became an ace, scoring his fifth and sixth victories.

On 3 September, Noltenius claimed another victory, only to find it was also being claimed by his commanding officer, Hermann Frommherz, who took credit for himself. The next day, Noltenius submitted another claim; that victory was also awarded to another pilot. A disgruntled Noltenius requested transfer to another squadron.

Meanwhile, Noltenius turned again to balloon busting. On 14 September, he attacked an observation balloon without knowing it was booby-trapped. The balloon full of high explosives was detonated from the ground during Noltenius's attack. The flaming explosion singed much of the fabric from his plane's wings, and left melted balloon fabric trailing from its spars. While Noltenius managed to fly the battered craft home and land safely, it was scrapped. Having escaped injury by the explosion, he was lightly wounded the next day by a ricocheting bullet.

He was shot down on 22 September by American ace George Vaughn, but survived. On 29 September, his requested transfer came through, and he shifted to Royal Prussian Jagdstaffel 6. By this time, Noltenius had successfully shot down another four enemy airplanes and three more balloons, raising his score to 13, with one pending. He shot down another balloon, and a Sopwith Camel in his new squadron. Then a clash with Ulrich Neckel, his commanding officer, led to another move, this time to Royal Prussian Jagdstaffel 11. He scored three victories for his new squadron on 23 October. Three more single-handed victories, on 28 October, 3 and 4 November, closed out his list of victims—his 21st and last officially credited victory was over an Airco DH.4 bomber of the American 11th Aero Squadron.

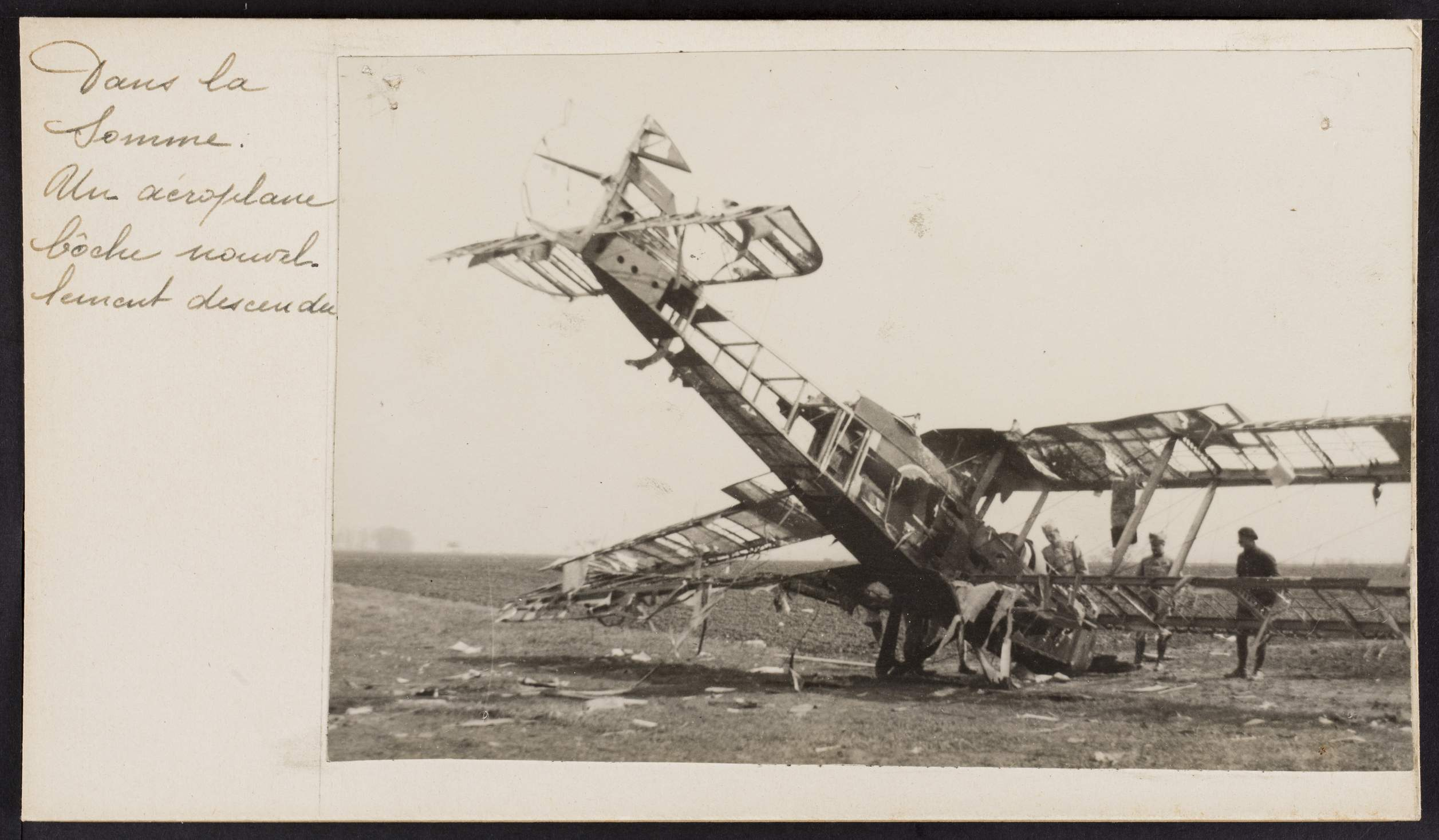
An Airco DH.4 was Noltenius' final victim.

On 8 November, Noltenius received the Royal House Order of Hohenzollern. His twentieth victory qualified him for the Pour le Mérite, but the Armistice three days later put an end to those awards. He had flown 141 combat sorties by war's end.

== Postwar life ==
After the Armistice ended the war, Germany was in chaos. Revolutionists from both extremes of the political spectrum fought for governance of their nation. Noltenius enrolled in the Freikorps for the German Revolution of 1918-1919, fighting against the communist Spartacus League revolutionists attempting to take over Germany. He then completed his medical studies. Once he qualified as a doctor, he moved his family to South America. He returned to Germany in 1933, and again took up flying.

Noltenius became involved in racial research, dealing with the concepts of a master race, including the Hamitic theory.

In 1936, Noltenius was one of the German flying veterans asked by Luftwaffe historians to contribute his extensive diaries to the government archives because the Jagdeschwader III war diary was incomplete. He obliged them. As a result, historians found that the wing's total air victories during its nine months of existence was found to amount to about 370 enemy aircraft destroyed.

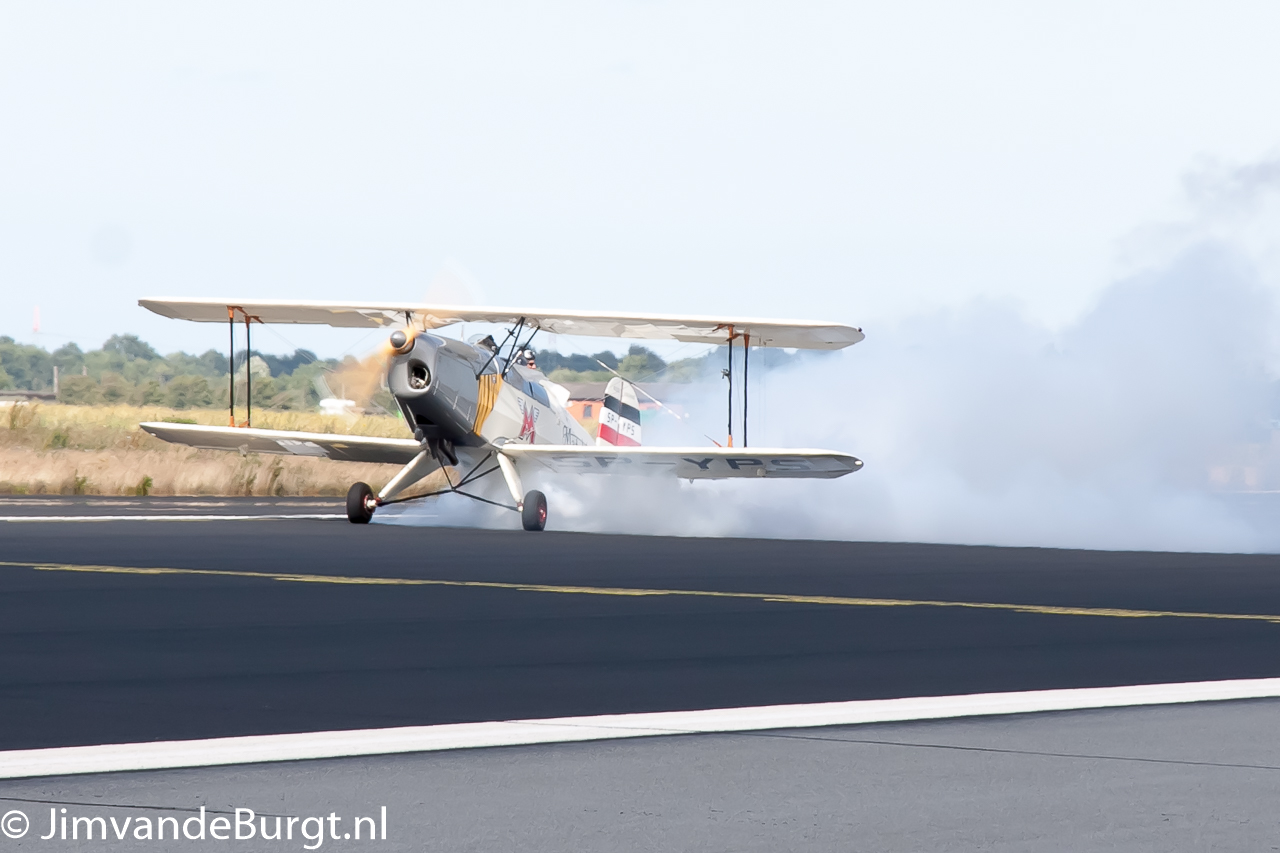
Noltenius' end came in a takeoff accident in a similar Bücker Bü 131.

Just before 2 PM on 1 March 1936, Friedrich Noltenius took off from Johannisthal Air Field near Berlin. He crashed his Bücker Bü 131 biplane and died en route to hospital.

== His legacy ==
In addition to German historians' use of his diaries in 1936, in later years The League for Aviation Historians would publish English translations from Noltenius's war diaries, accompanied by his military service record (Kriegsranglisten-Auszug). These items were published in the League's magazine, the Cross and Cockade Journal, Volume 7, Number 4 (Winter 1966), p 307.

== Sources ==
- Franks, Norman; Bailey, Frank W.; Guest, Russell (1993). Above the Lines: The Aces and Fighter Units of the German Air Service, Naval Air Service and Flanders Marine Corps, 1914–1918. Oxford: Grub Street. ISBN 978-0-948817-73-1.
- Shores, Christopher; Franks, Norman; Guest, Russell (1990). Above the Trenches: A Complete Record of the Fighter Aces and Units of the British Empire Air Forces, 1915–1920. Oxford, UK: Osprey Publishing. ISBN 978-0-919195-11-0.
- VanWyngarden, Greg (2016). Aces of Jagdgeschwader Nr III. Oxford, UK: Osprey Publishing. ISBN 978-1-47280-843-1.
