= Jagdstaffel 11 =

Military unit of the German Air Service in World War I

Jasta 11
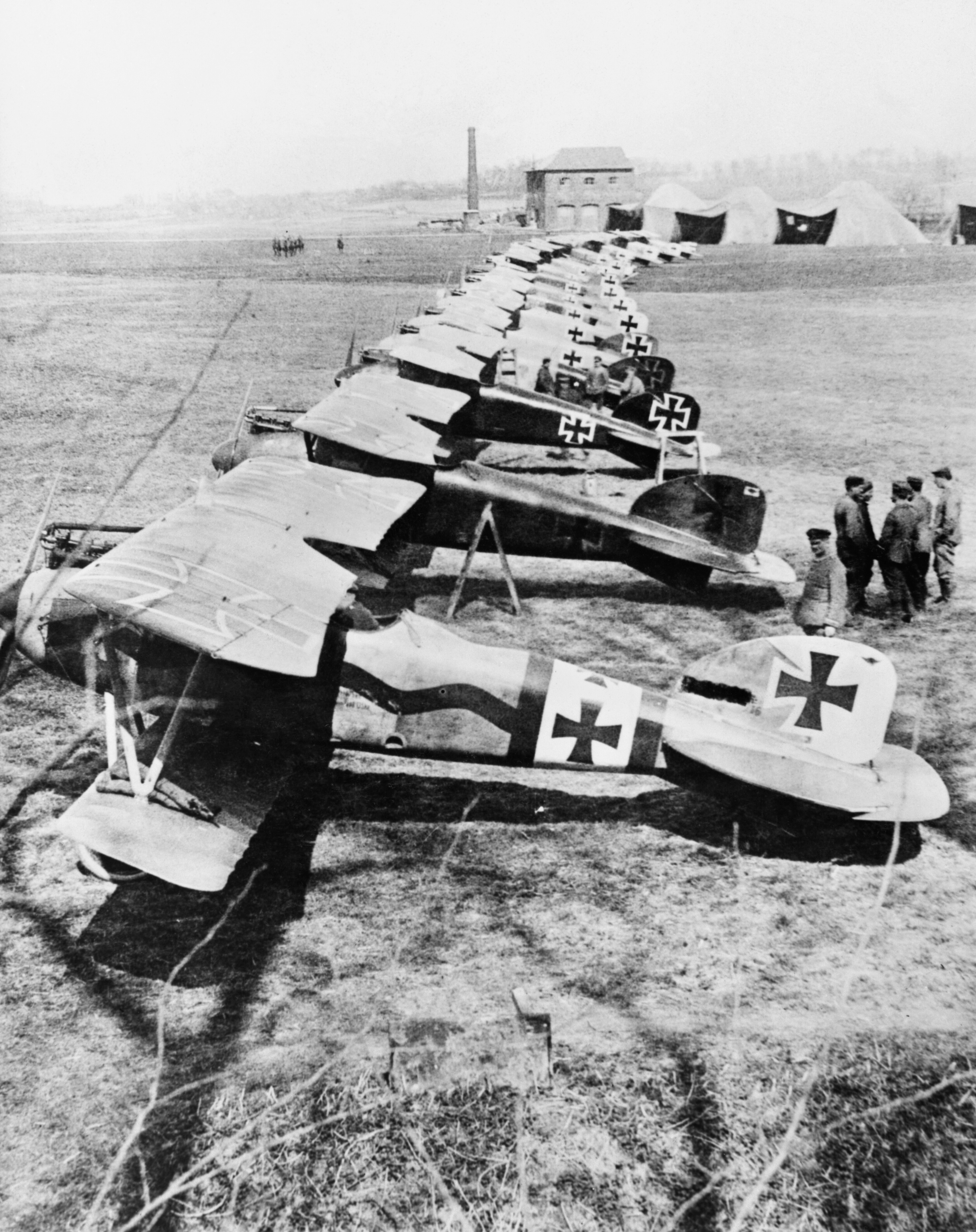
- Jasta 11 with Albatros D.III near Douai, France
- Active: 1916–1918
- Country: German Empire
- Branch: Luftstreitkräfte
- Type: Fighter squadron
- Part of: Jagdgeschwader 1
- Engagements: World War I

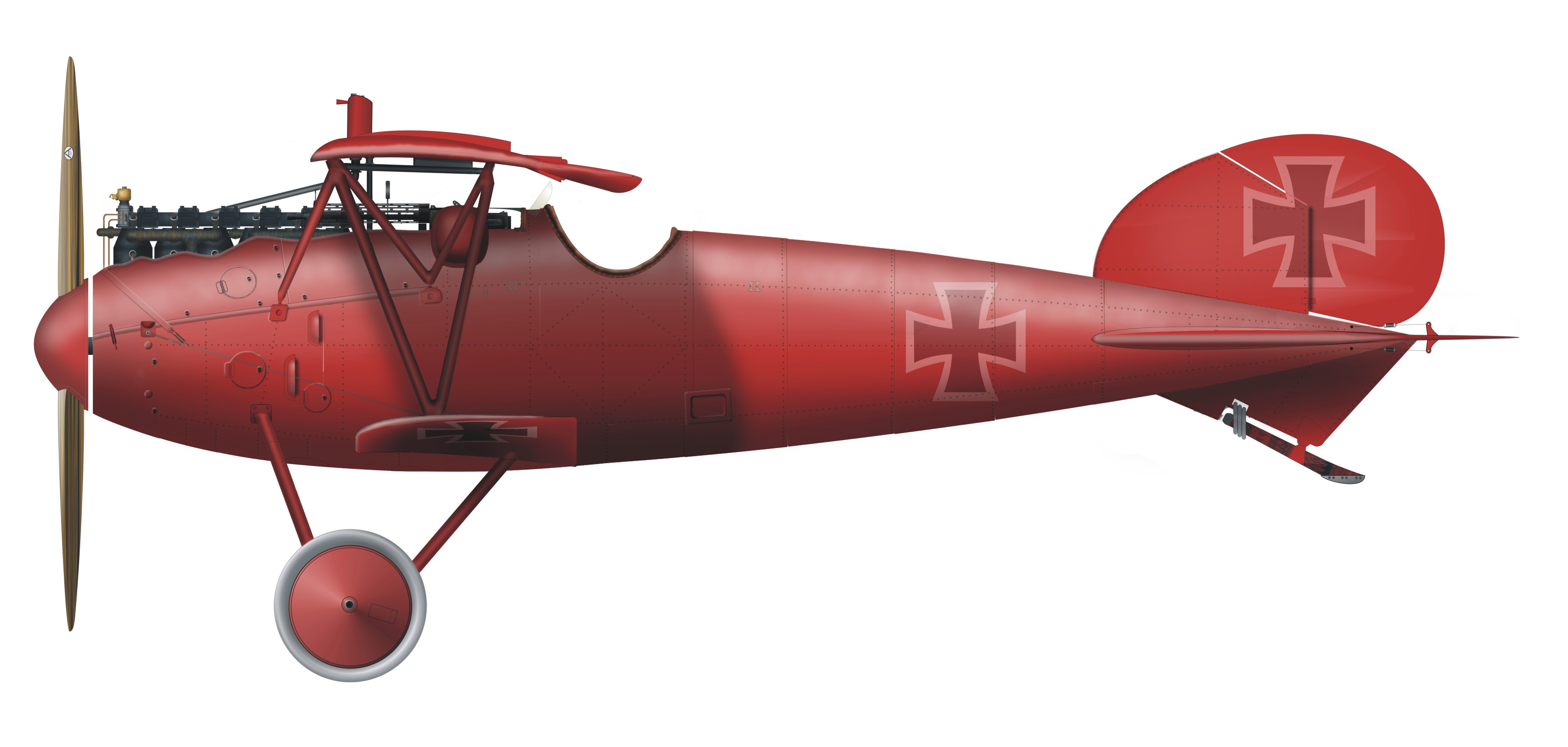
Albatros D.V. (von Richthofen)

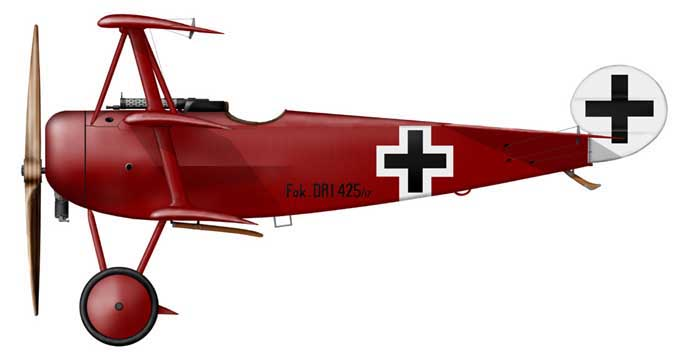
Fokker Dr I (von Richthofen)

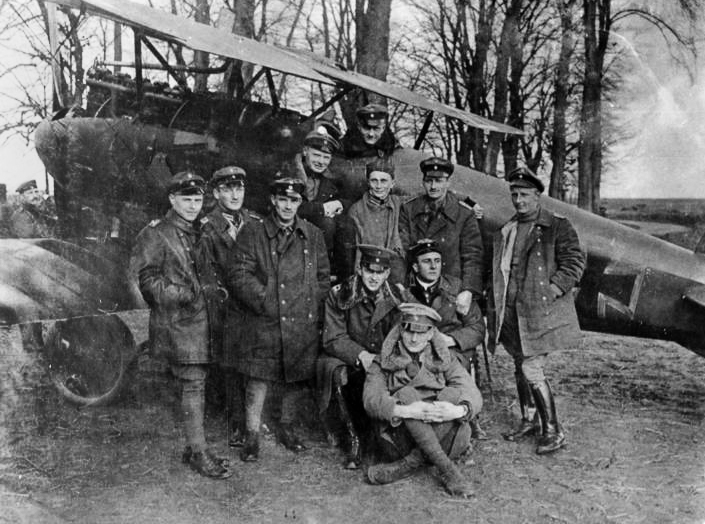
Manfred Freiherr von Richthofen [Center top in Albatros D.III cockpit] and Jasta 11 personnel: Standing From left to right: unknown (Leutnant Karl Allmenroeder?); Hans Hintsch; Vizfeldwebel Sebastian Festner; Leutnant Karl Emil Schaefer; Oberleutnant Kurt Wolff; Georg Simon; Leutnant Otto Brauneck. Seated Left to right: Esser; Krefft; in foreground Leutnant Lothar von Richthofen.

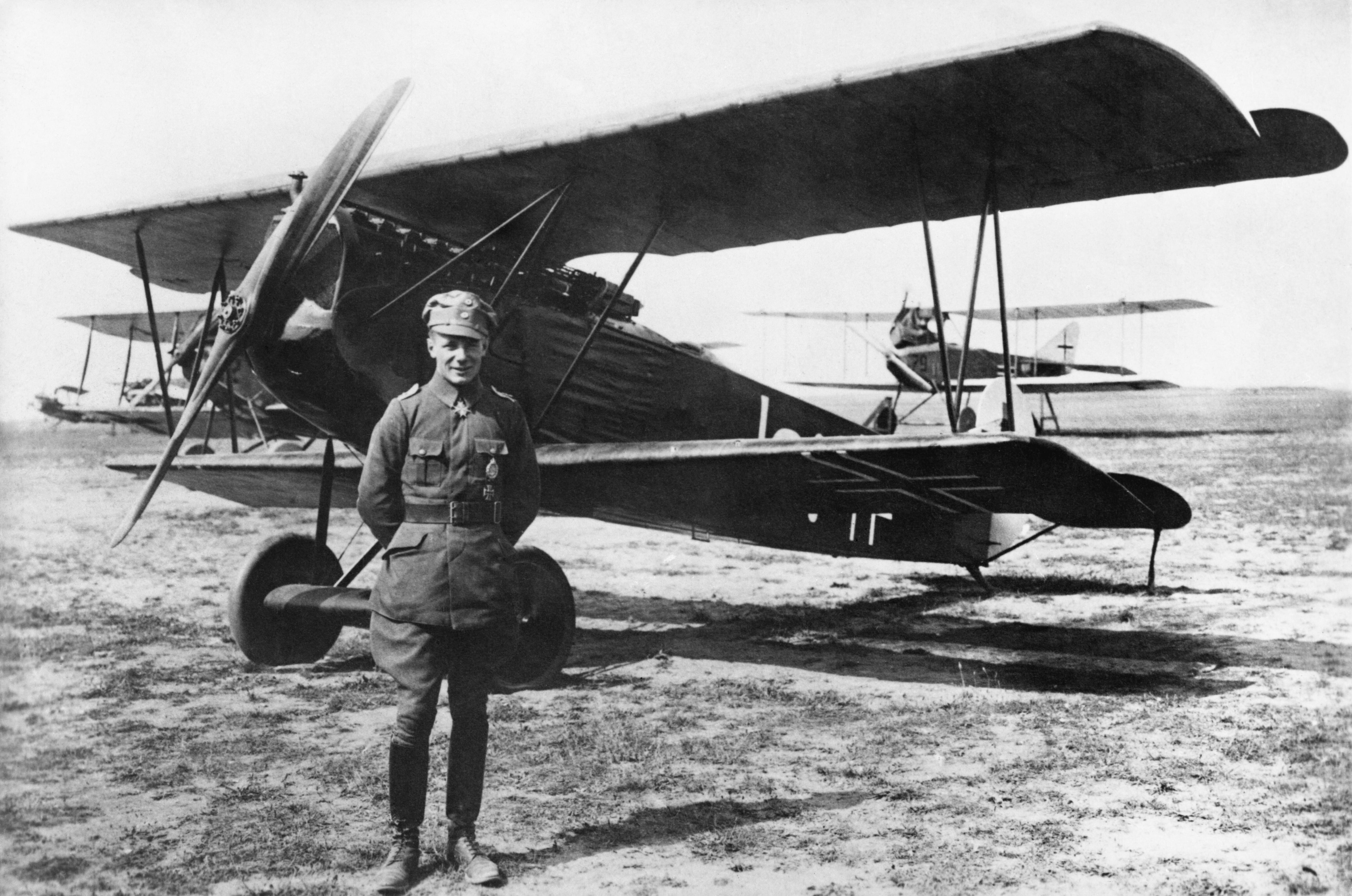
Ernst Udet beside his Fokker DVII "Lo"

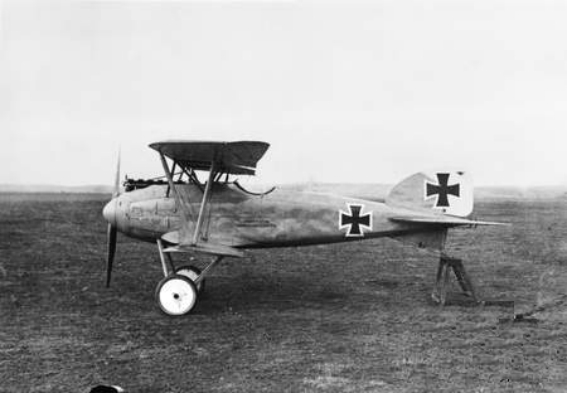
Karl Allmenröder's Albatros D.III fighter was painted red and white.

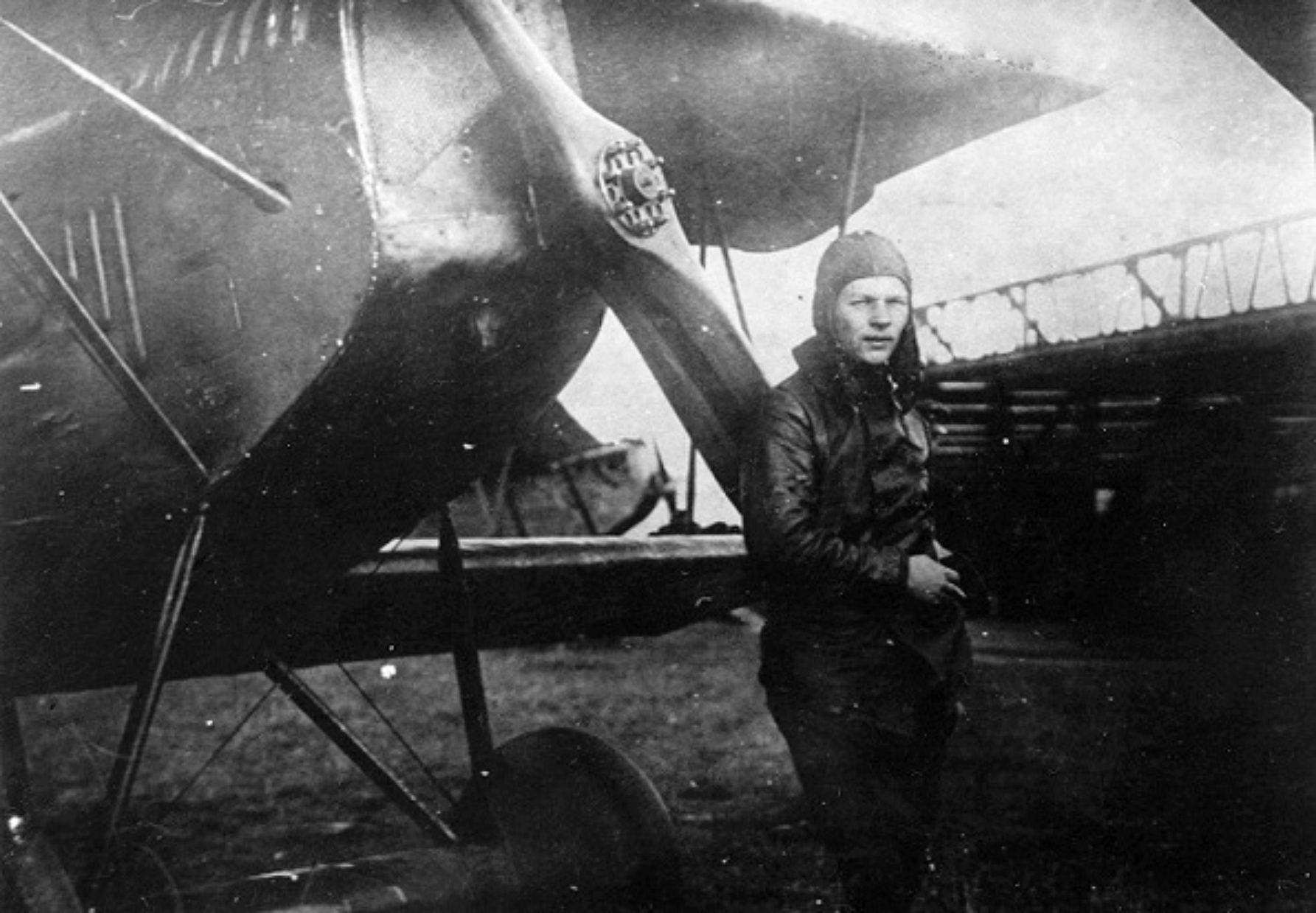
Lt. Wolfram von Richthofen in front of his Fokker D.VII fighter, summer 1918

Royal Prussian Jagdstaffel 11 ("No 11 Fighter Squadron"; commonly abbreviated to Jasta 11 and most known as The Flying Circus) was founded on 28 September 1916 from elements of 4 Armee's Kampfeinsitzerkommandos (or KEKs) 1, 2 and 3 and mobilized on 11 October as part of the German Air Service's expansion program, forming permanent specialised fighter squadrons, or "Jastas". It became the most successful fighter squadron in the Luftstreitkräfte and of the entire war.

== Founding ==
Jasta 11's first commander was First Lieutenant (Oberleutnant) Rudolf Lang, from its mobilization at Brayelles, until 14 January 1917. Jasta 11's first months of operations were very undistinguished.

It was not until the appointment of 24-year-old Cavalry Captain (Rittmeister) Manfred von Richthofen on 16 January 1917 as Commanding Officer that the unit commenced its path to fame and immortality. Von Richthofen, later known as the Red Baron (due to the practice of painting his aircraft red for easy identification during combat) was already an able tactical pilot and ace following several months of service in Jasta 2 and became a highly effective unit commander who led his pilots by example. He already had 16 victories and was awarded the Pour le Merite just before he assumed his command.

The unit was first based at Douai-Brayelles and then Roucourt for operations over the 6 Armee on the Arras front, the Jasta were equipped with various models of the excellent Albatros D.III sesquiplane fighter. Between 22 January 1917 and the end of March the Jasta claimed some 36 victories. The beginning of the Battle of Arras in early April meant a higher number of targets, with Jasta 11 logging 89 claims for aircraft destroyed in April (from a total of 298 made by all German fighter units for the month.) This decimation of the Royal Flying Corps became termed "Bloody April".

The Jasta's performance is all the more extraordinary as the unit usually flew in small flights of six or fewer. Significant 'scorers' in the unit that April were Manfred von Richthofen (21 claims), Lt. Kurt Wolff (22), Lt. Karl Schäfer (15), Manfred's brother Lothar (15) and NCO pilot Sebastian Festner (10).

== Members ==
- Cavalry Captain (Rittmeister) Manfred von Richthofen
- First Lieutenant (Oberleutnant) Rudolf Lang
- Lt. Kurt Wolff
- Lt. Karl Schäfer
- Lothar von Richthofen
- Wilhelm Reinhard
- Sebastian Festner
- Erich Rüdiger von Wedel
- Hans Wolff
- Willi Gabriel
- Werner Steinhäuser
- Anton Baierlein
- Karl Allmenröder
- Eberhard Mohnicke
- Wolfram von Richthofen
- Wilhelm Gisbert Groos
- Erich Just
- George Schiller
- Friedrich T. Noltenius
- Alfred Niederhoff
- Hans-Georg von der Osten
- Edgar Scholtz
- Hans Weiss
- Siegfried Gussmann
- (Oberleutnant) Georg "Simon" Shöster
- Otto Brauneck
- Carl-August von Schoenebeck
- Ernst Udet
- Carlos Meyer Baldó
- Richard Wenzl

== Incorporation into JG I ==
On 26 July 1917, Jasta 11 became part of Jagdgeschwader 1 - a collection of four Jastas into one administrative and highly mobile tactical force. Richthofen was promoted to command JG I, which was the second fighter wing in the history of military aviation. It was dubbed 'Richthofen's Flying Circus' because it mimicked a circus's logistics by using dedicated railway trains to transport it to forward airfields, and because of its vividly painted aircraft.

In September 1917, Jasta 11 would be equipped with Fokker Dr.I triplanes. It would operate these until April–May 1918, when it received the Fokker D.VIIs it would use until war's end.

Manfred von Richthofen remained Jasta commander until 26 June 1917, when his deputy, Leutnant Karl Allmenroeder took over. Following the latter's death the next day, former Jasta 11 pilot Leutnant Kurt Wolff took over after his transfer back from Jasta 29. After Wolff was wounded in September, Oberlt. Wilhelm Reinhard took charge until Wolff returned. Soon after Wolff was killed in action on 15 September, thereafter Lothar took command. Jasta 11 would then have a bewildering succession of other temporary commanding officers, especially when Lothar was frequently away from the front recovering from wounds. Oberleutnant Erich Rüdiger von Wedel was the last Staffelführer, from September 1918 until the end of the war. The Jasta was demobilised at Darmstadt on 16 November 1918.

Jasta 11 eventually became the highest scoring German Jasta of World War I, with 350 claims. The first was scored on 23 January 1917, the 100th on 23 April, the 200th on 17 August, the 250th on 2 April 1918, the 300th on 28 June 1918; the 350th was on 19th Sept 1918 (the Jasta 11 last victory) was the shooting down of a Royal Aircraft Factory R.E.8 of No. 3 Squadron RAAF [Pilot Lt. Clifford Peel and Observer Lt. J. P.Jeffers (both killed)] by Leutnant Julius Schulte-Frohlinde.[4 Victory claims]

It numbered no fewer than 26 aces among its ranks, and "graduated" pilots to command numerous other Jastas in the German Air force. In return it suffered 17 pilots killed, 2 captured as prisoners, and 2 killed in flying accidents. Its loss rate was thus less than one-tenth of its opponents, although it also suffered 19 wounded in action.
