= Lothar von Richthofen =

German WWI flying ace

Oberleutnant Lothar von Richthofen
- Lothar von Richthofen wearing the Pour le Mérite in 1917
- Born: Lothar Siegfried Freiherr von Richthofen; 27 September 1894; Kleinburg, Germany (present-day Wrocław, Poland)
- Died: 4 July 1922 (aged 27); Hamburg, Germany
- Burial place: South Cemetery, Wiesbaden; 50.060260°N 8.265810°E
- Relatives: Manfred von Richthofen (brother), Wolfram von Richthofen (cousin)
- Military career
- Allegiance: German Empire
- Branch: Prussian Army (1914–1915); German Air Force (1915–1918)
- Service years: 1914–1918
- Rank: Oberleutnant
- Units: 4th Dragoon Regiment; Battle Squadron No. 23; Fighter Squadron No. 11
- Awards: Pour le Mérite, Iron Cross First and Second Class

Lothar Siegfried Freiherr von Richthofen (27 September 1894 – 4 July 1922) was a German First World War fighter ace credited with 40 victories. He was a younger brother of top-scoring ace Manfred von Richthofen (the Red Baron) and a distant cousin of Luftwaffe Field Marshal Wolfram von Richthofen, who also became a flying ace.

Following the war, Lothar worked for a while on a farm before taking an industrial position. He married in June 1919 and had two children. Yearning for aviation, he accepted a position as a pilot, conveying passengers and postal mail between Berlin and Hamburg.

He died aged 27 on 4 July 1922 in a flying accident at Fuhlsbüttel.

== Early career ==
Richthofen was born on 27 September 1894. He and his brothers, Manfred and Bolko, (Note: Not to be confused with the archaeologist Bolko von Richthofen, a distant cousin) hunted wild boar, elk, birds, and deer.

Like his brother Manfred, Lothar began the war as a cavalry officer with the 4th Dragoon Regiment. He had remained in the public Gymnasium (high school), he was enrolled in compulsory military training at the Kriegsschule in Danzig (Gdańsk, Poland) when war began. On his own initiative Lothar returned to his unit. Lothar was nearly cut down by sniper fire while on patrol. In mid-October 1914, while stationed at Attigny, he was awarded the Iron Cross 2nd Class for valour. It was the only decoration that Lothar received during his cavalry service. The following month, his regiment was transferred to the Eastern Front.

== Jagdstaffel 11 ==
In February 1915 Manfred "rescued" his brother Lothar from the boredom of training new troops in Luben and encouraged him to also transfer to the Fliegertruppe.

Richthofen joined the German Army Air Service (Luftstreitkräfte) in late 1915. He served from January 1916 as an observer with Jasta 23, sometimes observing for Otto Creutzmann and saw action during the Battle of Verdun. He won the Iron Cross 1st Class in December and then began training as a pilot.

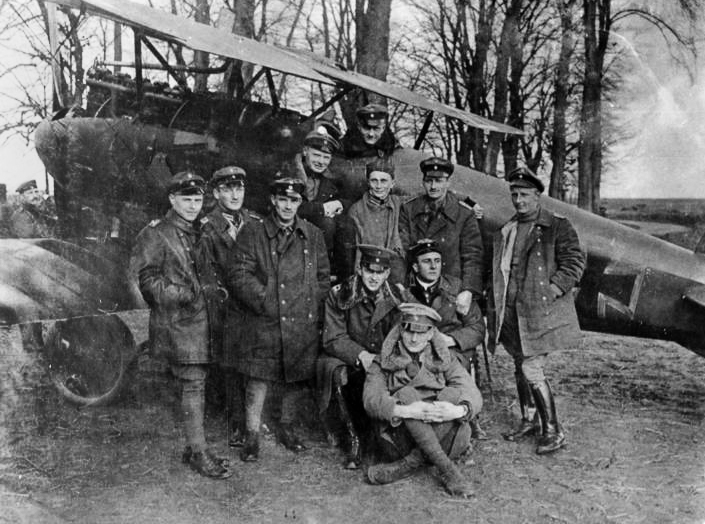
Lothar von Richthofen (seated on the ground) with other members of Jasta 11. His brother, Manfred, is in the cockpit. Photographed April 23, 1917

His first posting as a pilot was to his brother's Jasta 11 on 6 March 1917. An impulsive and aggressive pilot, unlike his coolly calculating brother Manfred, Lothar's first victory claim followed on 28 March for an FE 2b of No. 25 Squadron, Royal Flying Corps. The German high command appreciated the propaganda value of two Richthofens fighting together to defeat the enemy in the air.

Taking part in the period of German dominance called Bloody April by the British, Lothar had won 15 more victories by the beginning of May. When his brother went on leave, Lothar von Richthofen assumed command of the squadron.

== Albert Ball ==
During the first week of May 1917, Lothar von Richthofen scored three more victories. On the evening of 7 May near Douai, he led a flight of 5 Albatros D.III's from Jasta 11 that encountered 11 S.E.5s from the "elite" No. 56 Squadron RFC, including the top English ace of the time, Captain Albert Ball, as well as a SPAD S.VII from No. 19 Squadron, and a Sopwith Triplane of No 8 (Naval) Squadron. In a running battle in deteriorating visibility in the middle of a thunderstorm over Bourlon Wood, both sides became scattered. Richthofen engaged in single combat with the British Triplane. At about the same time, Ball was seen by fellow 56 Squadron pilot Cyril Crowe chasing a red Albatros into a thundercloud. Ball lost control of his plane and crashed fatally. Though forced to land his damaged aircraft, Richthofen escaped injury. The British Sopwith Triplane involved in the action returned to base undamaged.

Richthofen posted a claim for shooting down the Sopwith Triplane. However, the propaganda value of Ball's death under the guns of a German pilot was obvious, and the German High Command awarded a victory over Ball to Lothar. The fallacy of the award was readily apparent. The idea that an experienced pilot such as Richthofen would confuse a triplane with a biplane was ludicrous. Leutnant Hailer, a German pilot on the ground who witnessed the crash and was the first German at the crash scene saw no battle damage to Ball's plane. The doctor who autopsied Ball reported massive injuries to Ball from the crash, but no bullet wounds. Nevertheless, the official line was that Lothar von Richthofen shot down Albert Ball. Later research suggests that Ball became disoriented by vertigo, accidentally entering an inverted dive which choked his plane's carburetor and stopped the engine, causing him to crash.

== Pour le Mérite ==
Richthofen raised his total to 24 by 13 May, when, after shooting down a BE.2, he was wounded in the hip by anti-aircraft fire and crash-landed; his injuries kept him out of combat for five months. On 14 May he was awarded the Pour le Mérite, and he resumed command of Jasta 11 in September 1917. In early 1918 he suffered a severe ear infection and was hospitalised in Berlin.

Returning to his unit in February, he claimed 3 Bristol Fighter F2.Bs on 11 and 12 March, before he was again forced down on 13 March by a Sopwith Camel flown by Captain Augustus Orlebar of No. 73 Squadron. Nursing his crippled Fokker Dr1 Triplane into a landing, Richthofen clipped a high-tension wire and crashed heavily, suffering serious head injuries. He was still recovering when he learned of his brother's death.

Lothar returned to service with Jasta 11 in July 1918. He scored his final victory (a DH-9a) on 12 August 1918, flying a Fokker D.VII. The next day he was again wounded in action against Sopwith Camels, probably by Captain Field E. Kindley of the 148th Aero Squadron USAS. Lothar may also have been forced down by Canadian RAF pilot William Stephenson, later known as the World War II spymaster code-named "Intrepid". Lothar was promoted to Oberleutnant, and saw no further combat before the war ended in November.

Considering the amount of time Lothar von Richthofen spent on the front and in hospitals, he was one of the most combat efficient and prolific flying aces of the war, perhaps even more so than his brother Manfred. Of his total of 40 confirmed victories, Lothar scored 33 in just three months: 15 in April 1917, 8 in May 1917, and 10 in August 1918.

== Post war ==
With the return of peace, Lothar von Richthofen worked briefly on a farm before accepting an industrial position. He married Countess Doris von Keyserlingk in Cammerau in June 1919, fathering a daughter, Carmen Viola (1920–1971), and a son, Wolf-Manfred (1922–2010), before the marriage was dissolved. He then became a commercial pilot, carrying passengers and mail between Berlin and Hamburg.

== Death ==
On 4 July 1922 Richthofen died in a crash of his LVG C VI at Hamburg due to an engine failure. Also on board were actress Fern Andra and her director Georg Bluen. Both Bluen and Andra survived, Andra spending a year recovering from her injuries.

Lothar von Richthofen was interred next to his father at the Garrison Cemetery in Schweidnitz, but the cemetery was levelled by the Poles when the city was transferred to Poland after World War II. Today the area is a football field, although von Richthofen's headstone still exists.

A plaque to Lothar's memory is next to his brother Manfred von Richthofen's grave on the Südfriedhof in Wiesbaden.

== Orders and medals ==
throughout section

Prussia/German Empire

- Pour le Mérite, 14 May 1917 (in recognition of his 24th aerial victory)
- Royal House Order of Hohenzollern, Knight's Cross with Swords, 10 May 1917
- Iron Cross of 1914, 1st and 2nd Class

Other German States

- Military Merit Order, 4th Class with Swords (Bavaria)
- Hanseatic Cross, Hamburg

Other Central Powers

- Liakat Medal in Silver with Sabers (Ottoman Empire)
- Turkish War Medal of 1915 (a.k.a. "Gallipoli Star" or "Iron Crescent"), Ottoman Empire

Prussian/Imperial German Badges

- Prussian Military Pilot Badge
- Wound Badge in Silver

== In popular culture ==
- Lothar von Richthofen and his brother Manfred are featured in the popular PC game Red Baron.
- In the 1971 film Von Richthofen and Brown, Lothar von Richthofen is portrayed by Brian Foley.
- In the 2008 biopic The Red Baron, Lothar von Richthofen is portrayed by actor Volker Bruch.
- He and his brothers also appeared in the 2006 video game Snoopy vs. the Red Baron.
- He may have appeared in the 2010 sequel Snoopy Flying Ace.
- He appears in the Riverworld book series by science fiction author Philip José Farmer.
- Players can play as Lothar von Richthofen in the Flying Corps video game.

== General bibliography ==
- Bowyer, Chaz (2004). Albert Ball VC. London, UK: Crecy Publications. ISBN 978-0-947554-89-7.
- Franks, Norman; Bailey, Frank; Guest, Russell (1993). Above the Lines: A Complete Record of the Aces and Fighter Units of the German Air Service, Naval Air Service and Flanders Marine Corps 1914–1918. London, UK: Grub Street Publishing. ISBN 978-0-948817-73-1.
- Franks, Norman; Giblin, Hal (2003). Under the Guns of the Kaiser's Aces. London, UK: Barnes & Noble Books. ISBN 978-1-904010-02-9.
- Treadwell, Terry; Wood, Allan (1997). German Knights of the Air, 1914-1918: The Holders of the Orden Pour le Merite. New York, New York, USA: Grub Street Publishing. ISBN 978-0760707906.
- von Richthofen, Manfred (1969). The Red Baron. New York, New York, USA: ACE Books.
