= Wilhelm Reinhard (pilot) =

German pilot during World War I (1891–1918)

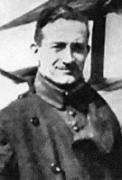
- Born: 12 March 1891; Düsseldorf
- Died: 3 July 1918 (aged 27); Adlershof, near Berlin
- Military career
- Allegiance: German Empire
- Branch: Luftstreitkräfte
- Service years: 1909–1918
- Rank: Hauptmann (Captain)
- Nickname: "Willi"
- Units: FeldFlieger Abteilung (A) 205 (Flier Detachment (Artillery) 205); Flieger-Abteilung 28 (Flier Detachment 28)
- Commands: Jagdstaffel 11 (Fighter Squadron 11); Jagdstaffel 6 (Fighter Squadron 6); Jagdgeschwader 1 (Fighter Wing I)
- Conflicts: World War I

Hauptmann Wilhelm "Willi" Reinhard (12 March 1891 – 3 July 1918) was a German pilot during World War I. Reinhard became a flying ace during the war, credited with 20 confirmed aerial victories. After commanding two successive fighter squadrons, he was picked to replace Manfred von Richthofen as commander of Jagdgeschwader 1 when the Red Baron fell in combat. Reinhard died on 3 July 1918 while testing a prototype fighter.

== Biography ==
=== Early life ===
Wilhelm Reinhard was born in Düsseldorf on 12 March 1891.

=== Military service ===
Entering military service in 1909 as an officer cadet, Reinhard was assigned to the 14th Bavarian Foot Artillery Regiment. He was severely wounded in the leg in November 1914. Left unfit for service in the trenches, he was accepted for pilot training in the aviation branch, returning to active service in June 1915. Once assigned to a combat unit, Reinhard was seriously wounded a second time.

He returned to duty in February 1916, having been promoted to Oberleutnant. He was assigned to FeldFlieger Abteilung (A) 205 (Flier Detachment (Artillery) 205), Then he was posted to the Balkans with Flieger-Abteilung 28 (Flier Detachment 28).

In early 1917, he was returned to the Western Front to attend fighter pilot training. On 24 June, he was transferred to Jagdstaffel 11 (Fighter Squadron 11) and scored his first victory, over British ace Geoffrey Hornblower Cock (taken POW). He was again wounded on 4 September 1917, having scored eight aerial victories with the squadron.

When he returned to duty, he joined Jagdstaffel 6 (Fighter Squadron 6) as Commanding Officer on 26 November 1917. He shot down a British foe on 4 January 1918, and followed up with five more wins by 12 April. Along the way, on 23 March 1918, he was promoted to Hauptmann. Then the Red Baron, Manfred von Richthofen was killed in action on 21 April; Reinhard succeeded to the Baron's command of Jagdgeschwader 1 (Fighter Wing 1) the next day. He would shoot down eight more enemy planes while leading the Jagdgeschwader, bringing his total aerial victories to 20 by 12 June 1918. As was customary, his 20th victory sparked his nomination for the Pour le Mérite, Germany's greatest military honor.

=== Accidental death ===
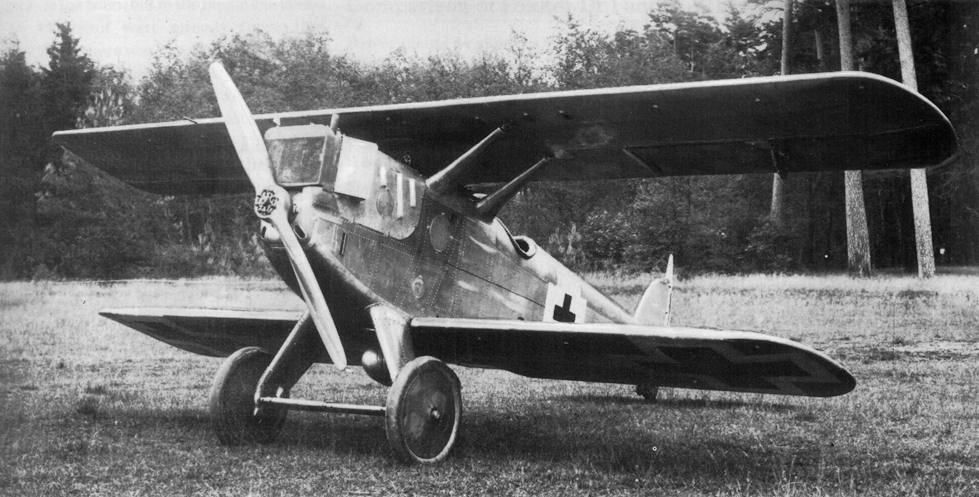
A Dornier-Zeppelin D.I

On 18 June 1918, Reinhard left his unit to travel to Berlin to attend fighter aircraft trials in nearby Adlershof. On 3 July, after Hermann Göring finished test flying a Dornier-Zeppelin D.I, Reinhard took it up for a test flight. A strut broke, causing the upper wing to fail, and Reinhard plunged to his death. His death scotched his award of the Pour le Mérite, which was not conferred posthumously.

Wilhelm Reinhard was buried in his native Düsseldorf.

== Honors and awards ==
- Prussia: Knight's Cross with Swords of the Royal House Order of Hohenzollern
- Prussia: Iron Cross, First and Second Class
- Baden: Order of the Zahringer Lion, Knight Second Class with Swords
- Bulgaria: Bravery Order Fourth Class, First and Second Degrees

== End notes ==
Military offices
Preceded by Manfred von Richthofen	Commanding Officer of Fighter Wing No. 1 (German Empire); 1918	Succeeded by Hermann Göring
