= Bloody April =

Air campaign during the Battle of Arras

- Part of the Battle of Arras
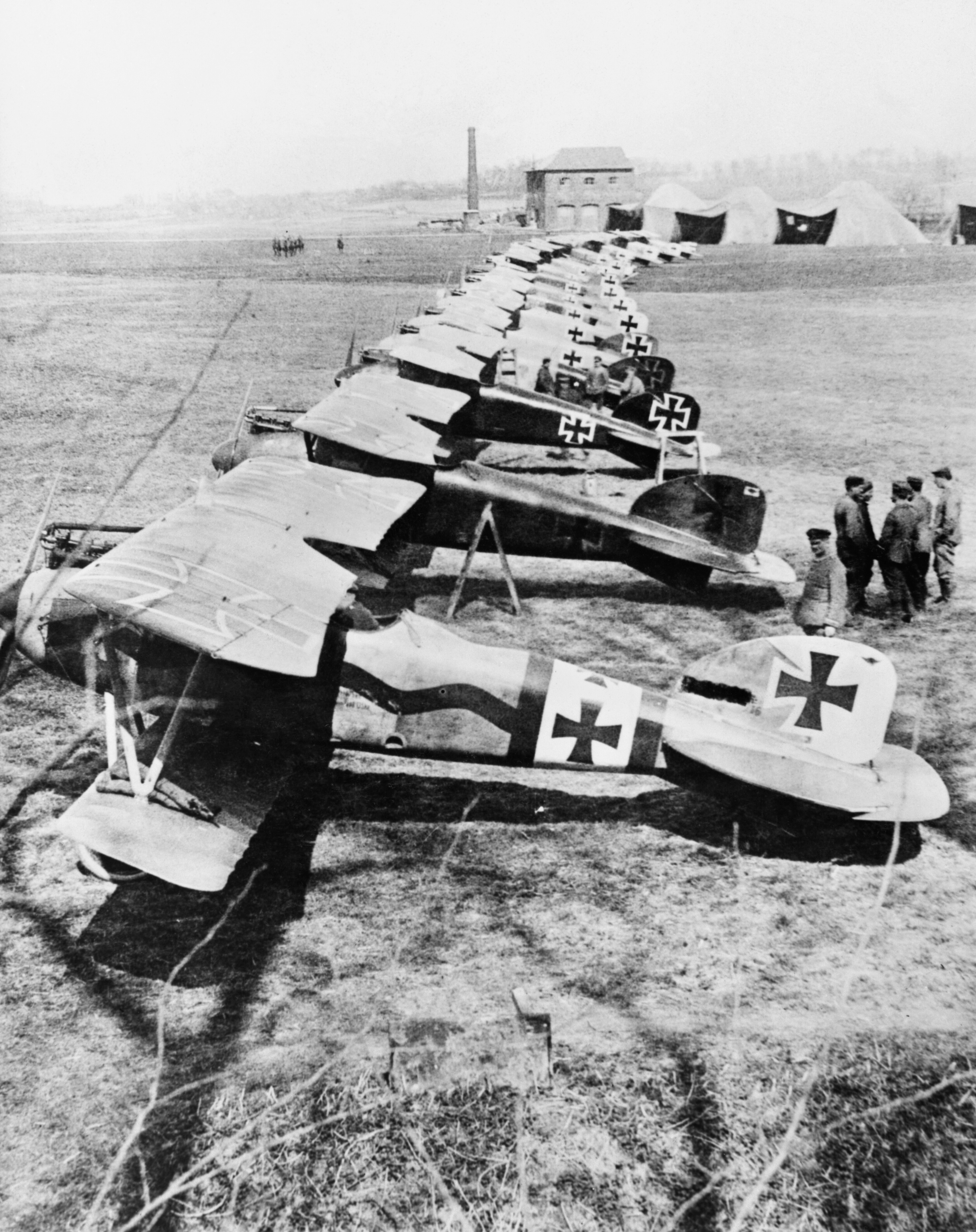
- Albatross DIIIs at La Brayelle, France, in March 1917
| Date | April 1917 |
| Location | Mainly Arras, France |

Belligerents
| (United Kingdom) British Empire | German Empire |

Commanders and leaders
| (United Kingdom) Hugh Trenchard | (German Empire) Ernst von Hoeppner |

Strength
| 365 | 195 |

Casualties and losses
| 245-275 aircraft 421 aircrew (207 killed) | 66 aircraft |

Bloody April was the name given after the fact to the British portion of the air campaign intended to support the Battle of Arras in April 1917. The British Royal Flying Corps suffered exceptionally high casualties while conducting operations over the Western Front during this time. The losses coincided with the introduction of the German Albatros D.III fighter at the beginning of 1917, which outperformed most British aircraft in service at that time, and German pilots were also far better trained than their British counterparts. The RFC lost at least 245 aircraft and more than 400 aircrew were killed or reported missing. German losses were much lower. German air superiority proved temporary as the arrival of aircraft like the Sopwith Camel in July enabled Allied forces to regain parity in the air after the campaign was over.

== Background ==
By the summer of 1916 the British had achieved general air superiority over the German air service. But this situation soon changed dramatically. After the heavy losses and failures against the French over Verdun in 1916 and during the early phases of the Somme, the German Oberste Heeresleitung had reorganised their air forces into the Luftstreitkräfte by October 1916, including the formation of Jastas (specialized fighter units). These units were led by highly experienced pilots, some of them veterans of the Fokker Scourge period. The introduction of the first Albatros fighters in September gave the Germans technological as well as organizational superiority over the British, which only increased when the Albatros D.II entered service in January 1917. The new fighters outclassed British aircraft such as the Airco DH.2, the F.E.8 and Sopwith Pup. The new German fighters were armed with two forward-firing machine guns, giving them a firepower advantage as well (most Allied aircraft at this time had only one gun). The combination of new aircraft and improved organization allowed the Germans to regain air superiority by November 1916.

The German air service also invested more time and effort in pilot training than the RFC. While a British pilot could enter combat service with as few as 35 flying hours, his German counterpart usually arrived at the front lines with between 90 and 100 flying hours. French pilots also received extensive training before being sent to a combat unit. The British did eventually make changes to their training programs, but this oversight contributed to their high losses during what became known as Bloody April.

Finally, the organization of the Luftstreitkräfte gave them certain advantages going into the April offensive. Not only did they control all German anti-aircraft units, they maintained a robust communication network with ground controllers located with corps and army headquarters. This allowed them to direct fighter squadrons where they were most needed instead of simply flying area patrols. In essence the Germans could elect to intercept (or not intercept) Allied formations on their own terms and with the maximum available strength. They also assigned dedicated units called Schutzstaffeln (or Schustas) to provide close escort to their artillery observation and reconnaissance units. This allowed the Jastas to focus exclusively on intercepting Allied aircraft.

In January 1917 Field marshal Douglas Haig and General Robert Nivelle agreed to a plan for a joint spring offensive, with the British attacking at Arras. The British operations at Arras were intended to support the main attack along the Aisne known as the Nivelle Offensive. In order to achieve air superiority along the front extending from Givenchy-en Gohelle in the north to a point near Croisilles in the south there were twenty-five squadrons containing around 365 serviceable aeroplanes (one third of which were pursuit or fighter types) distributed to the 1st, 3rd and 5th armies. Facing them were roughly 195 German aircraft, with about half of those being fighters.

== Battle ==
Although combat operations in the air had been increasing in intensity since March, the actual British main effort began on 5 April when the weather along the front finally improved enough to allow air operations. The objective was to push the German air service away from the immediate battle area to ensure maximum operational freedom for the corps aeroplanes (typically artillery spotting and reconnaissance aircraft). Close protection was only to be provided when they were engaged at unusual distances across the lines. The French air service also began offensive operations in preparation for their army's attack.

On 5 April, a formation of six Bristol F2A aircraft from No. 48 Squadron, led by Captain W. Leefe Robinson, V.C., engaged in an offensive patrol near Douai. Both the fighter and the squadron were untried in combat (Hugh Trenchard had decided to allocate the new fighter to a new squadron and held both in reserve instead of assigning the F2A to more experienced units and committing it earlier in the campaign), and Leefe Robinson had likewise never taken part in aerial combat on the Western Front. They encountered Manfred von Richthofen leading five Albatros D. IIIs from Jasta 11. During the engagement two Bristols were downed by Richthofen and two more by members of his squadron. Leefe Robinson was also shot down and taken prisoner. Only two Bristols returned, one heavily damaged. Richthofen criticized the Bristol Fighter, stating his aircraft outperformed it in speed and climbing ability. There had been high expectations for the Bristol two-seat scout, but its first combat encounters proved disappointing.

The aircraft bombing programme, initiated on 5 April 1917, aimed to force the Germans to withdraw their anti-aircraft defenses. Brigades I, II, IV, and V allocated six B.E. aircraft each for medium-distance bombing, while long-distance raids were conducted by the Ninth Wing's squadrons. On the first day of operations, attacks targeted Hirson's engine depot, Don Station, and railway junctions at St. Quentin and Marcoing. The No. 100 Squadron conducted night raids on Douai aerodrome, losing one F.E.2b. The British claimed to have destroyed four hangers, but the Germans reported only light damage from the attack. The objective of forcing the Germans to withdraw their anti-aircraft batteries also was unsuccessful.

On 6 April, bombing resumed despite earlier losses. Missions against Aulnoye and Valenciennes achieved only modest success. Weather conditions hindered operations on 7 April; nonetheless, the British reported successful attacks were carried out on Douai. However, the Germans again reported little to no damage and noted the British didn't attack the Douai airfield again. The bombing campaign escalated on 8 April, with additional attacks against Aulnoye and Valenciennes. A strike against Crown Prince Rupprecht's headquarters resulted in the loss of multiple D.H.4s with little damage inflicted on the target. Although the British usually reported major fires and damage after each raid, they were only able to inflict minimal damage on German targets.

On 9 April at 5:30 a.m., the planned ground attack began under low visibility and snowy conditions. The plan called for multiple short advances, with support from patrol aeroplanes that guided infantry by calling for flares. By 7:30 a.m., the infantry aimed for their second objective but faced fierce German resistance which persisted until about noon when most of the line was secured except a stubborn hold at the Railway Triangle. By 2:00 p.m., the 15th Division successfully captured this position, continuing their advance into German lines throughout the day. Artillery support was aided by aerial reports, although this was hindered for at least part of the day by weather.

On 10 April, continued contact patrols helped locate British advances despite difficult visibility. The main action that day included the critical capture of Monchy-le-Preux at 5:00 a.m., witnessed by air observers alongside accompanying tanks and cavalry. Although enemy air activity intensified, with significant losses for British air units from enemy fighters, some British aircraft managed to engage and claimed to have downed enemy planes. The weather remained variable, impacting both ground operations and air support. British claims to the contrary, the Germans recorded no aircraft losses on April 9 or 10.

On 11 April 1917, enemy activity was present, but three R.E. 8 aircraft from No. 59 Squadron encountered only slight opposition while photographing a section of the Drocourt-Queant line. During a bombing mission over Cambrai, fighting highlighted the defensive weaknesses of formations including B.E. airplanes. An Albatros two-seater was shot down by a naval pilot, but two B.E.s and a Spad were lost in combat with Albatros and Halberstadt fighters. On 12 April, amid snow blizzards, limited air work occurred, though photographic reconnaissances led to fighting between F.E.2bs of No. 25 Squadron and six enemy single-seaters, resulting in the loss of two F.E.2bs and one Sopwith, while four enemy fighters were shot down. Late on the 12th, air reports indicated fires and explosions in areas showing that the enemy might withdraw from Vimy ridge positions, prompting orders for vigorous patrols the next day.

13 April allowed for extensive air operations with favorable weather. The Flying Corps maintained offensive patrols, encountering enemy aircraft who attempted to protect their own planes dealing with the German retirement near Vimy. Several aircraft, including Nieuports and F.E.2bs, were lost, but no enemy losses were confirmed. The day also saw renewed bombing efforts: No. 20 Squadron attacked Wervicq and another aerodrome at Mouveaux without incident, while No. 22 Squadron bombed Busigny railway station. However, a mass bombing attack on Henin-Lietard turned disastrous when Richthofen's fighters engaged unescorted bombers post-attack, resulting in three F.E.2bs and one Martinsyde lost, despite a single German fighter being shot down.

Earlier on the same day, six R.E.8s from No. 59 Squadron were sent to photograph the Drocourt-Queant Switch line; however, they faced a stronger German formation led by Richthofen after a delayed support escort failed to arrive on time. This left the reconnaissance aircraft vulnerable, resulting in the loss of all six R.E.8s, with most pilots and observers killed in the encounter. On 14 April, following the loss of unescorted R.E.8's, a reconnaissance task to photograph the Drocourt line was assigned to a stronger formation of six F.E.2bs from No. 11 Squadron, escorted by four Nieuport single-seaters from No. 29 Squadron. This operation coincided with the scheduled offensive patrols by Nos. 19 and 60 Squadrons, but the photographic unit was engaged by German Halberstadt and Albatros Scouts. Despite fierce fighting, all F.E.2bs returned safely, albeit without the photos; one German fighter and a Nieuport were lost in the encounter.

On 16 April, the French offensive commenced but did not achieve the anticipated success, necessitating a renewal of British operations at Arras to draw German forces from the Aisne Heights. Favorable flying conditions allowed for effective reconnaissance of the Drocourt-Queant line by F.E.2b aircraft from No. 11 Squadron, supported by Nieuport escorts and offensive formations from other squadrons. Despite the absence of enemy resistance during some missions, No. 60 Squadron encountered fierce opposition, resulting in the loss of four Nieuport fighters against one German aircraft. Following poor flying conditions that delayed planned offensives, weather improved by 20 April, enabling artillery and air cooperation to resume. On 21 April, preliminary bombardments initiated under clear skies facilitated the registration of enemy positions and destruction of wire entanglements.

Increased aerial activity ensued, marked by attacks on enemy balloons and engagement missions involving multiple fighter formations on both sides. Despite considerable British aerial presence, confrontations were generally minimal, with enemy pilots adopting evasive tactics. However, attempts by No. 11 Squadron to conduct reconnaissance over the Drocourt-Queant line were unsuccessful; one formation was repelled by German fighters, leading to losses and injured personnel among British aircraft. On 22 April, Richthofen and his pilots demonstrated the advantages of superior fighting aircraft in various air encounters. Two Sopwith Triplane pilots, Commander R. S. Dallas and Sub-Lieutenant T. G. Culling, engaged a formidable formation of fourteen German aircraft, comprising two-seaters and single-seater fighters, at 16,000 feet. Over the course of 45 minutes, the Sopwith pilots successfully disrupted the enemy's mission, shooting down three enemy planes while forcing the remaining Germans to retreat.

Later that day an evening bombing mission targeted the Cambrai aerodrome, with six F.E.2bs and their escorting Sopwith fighters encountering opposition from four enemy single-seaters. The Sopwith fighters effectively defended the bombers. However, the Spad fighters from No. 23 Squadron experienced confusion, mistaking Albatros fighters for friendly aircraft, which resulted in losses. On 23 April, infantry assaults commenced along the First and Third Armies' frontlines, amid continuous fighting, as the enemy executed strong counter-attacks. Despite the pilots' attempts to gather intelligence through contact patrols, communication issues regarding flare signaling led to ineffective artillery support.

On 23 April, Ball shot down a German aircraft by maneuvering past the observer's gun position. The following day, ground operations continued with local counter-attacks from Germans, though aerial activity intensified as attempts to attack German kite balloons were largely thwarted. From 25 to 28 April, the corps squadrons focused on supporting artillery operations under low cloud cover. On 28 April, an infantry attack commenced, leading to significant advances at Arleuxen-Gohelle, with German forces pushed back along a two-mile front. The day ended with significant losses for the British, particularly for B.E. aircraft involved in tactical operations, while bombing raids on enemy stations went largely unchallenged.

The situation escalated on 29 April with improved weather resulting in intense aerial combat. Six Albatros fighters attacked a patrol of S.E.5s, leading to a fierce engagement that resulted in the capture of one F.E.2 pilot and the destruction of one Albatros. Major H. D. Harvey-Kelly engaged the enemy only to have all his Spads shot down, resulting in his capture and subsequent death from wounds. The Sopwith triplanes from No. 1 (Naval) Squadron attempted to intervene but arrived too late to assist. They engaged the German fighters, claiming three enemy aircraft. British claims appear to have been overstated (they eventually claimed 11 German aircraft downed and 21 observed going down out of control); the Germans only recorded the loss of four aircraft (and one balloon) during the entire day.

== Aftermath ==
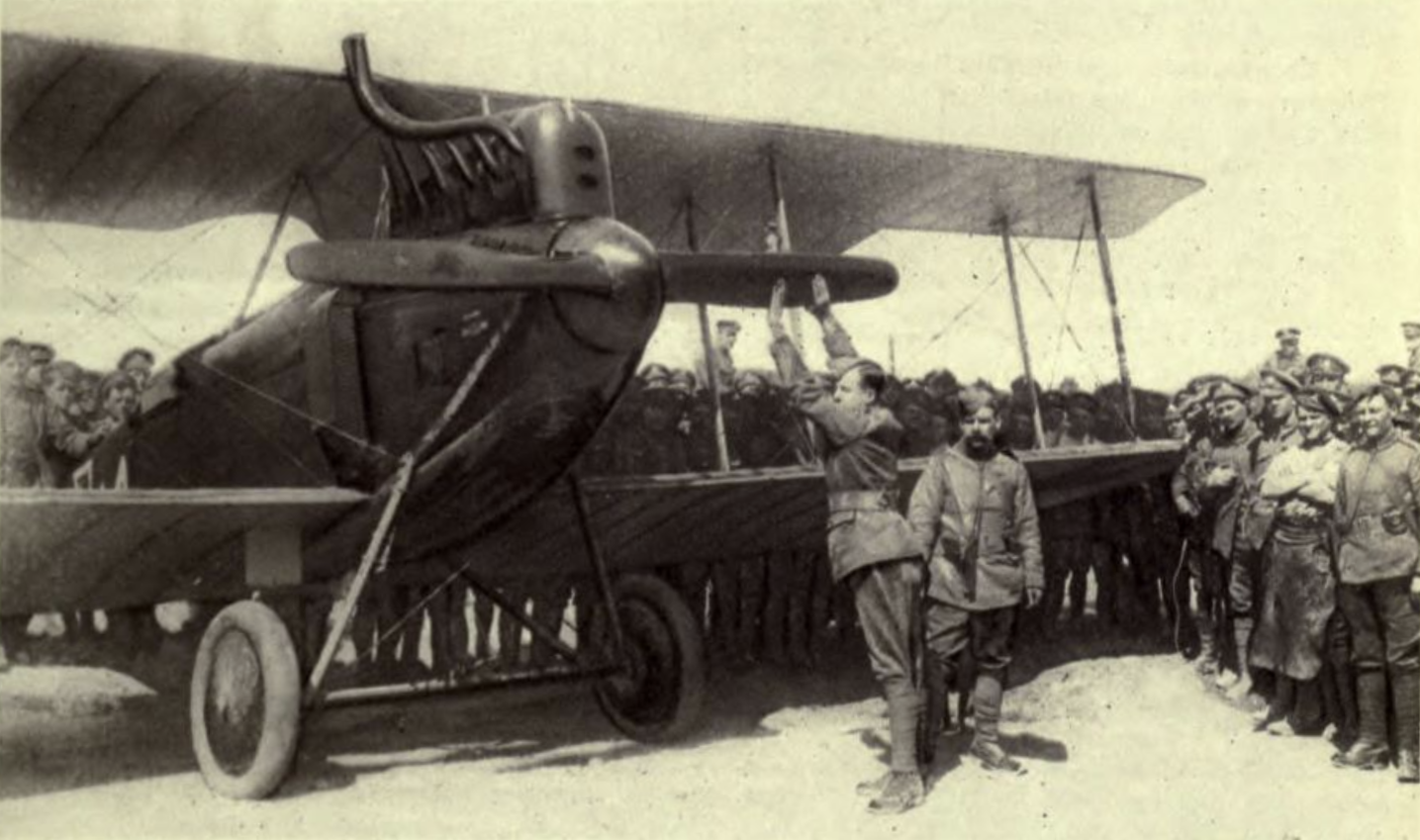
"A 'bird' to the British: A German biplane brought down behind Canadian lines" (The Illustrated War News, May 1917) German DFW C.V biplane 5927/16 forced down on 24 Apr 17 near Béthune, France by pilots from 8 Naval Sqdn and 40 Sqdn RFC

During April 1917 the British lost between 245–275 aircraft, 211 aircrew killed or missing and 108 prisoners of war. The German Air Services recorded the loss of 66 aircraft during the same period. Under Richthofen's leadership, Jasta 11 scored 89 victories during April, over a third of the British losses. Another 75 aircraft were shot down by German anti-aircraft batteries. These losses led one historian to conclude "aside from a few stellar accomplishments by individual flyers, the [British and French] campaign was a complete failure from an air perspective."

After April 1917, the Royal Flying Corps began receiving new aircraft that performed on the same level as the Albatros D.III. The Sopwith Camel, a maneuverable fighter with twin synchronized machine guns (the majority of British fighters before this carried a single forward-firing machine gun, while most German fighters by 1917 had two), entered service in June. Nieuport squadrons replaced older types with Camels and the improved S.E.5a, which offered greater speed and a more powerful engine. Improved versions of the Bristol F.2A also entered service for fighter duties (and the British adjusted their tactics to better use the Bristol's capabilities), while the DH.4 took on light bombing missions and the R.E.8 became the main corps aircraft. By July, the majority of RFC squadrons in France were operating new high-performance aircraft.

The RFC also modified its tactics. They placed more emphasis on protecting artillery observation planes and on intercepting German artillery flyers. New measures included the use of signals-intercept detachments to monitor German wireless communications. These detachments provided directional fixes for fighter flights on standby, allowing for rapid interception missions. This approach replaced earlier methods that had failed to adequately shield British corps aircraft, and essentially replicated what the Germans had been doing prior to Bloody April. The adoption of these new aircraft types and tactical adjustments allowed the RFC to reduce losses and better protect its operations during subsequent campaigns.

For their part, the German air service made several changes to their existing organization and doctrine. They had already been successfully using ground observation posts to direct fighter interceptions, so no changes were needed. However, they began concentrating the existing Jastas into larger fighter wings (Jagdgeschwader) composed of four squadrons with a command staff. These formations allowed the Germans to commit multiple squadrons to any air combat. They also organized existing ground support units (Schustas) into dedicated ground attack squadrons called Schlachtstafflen. Operating specialized ground attack aircraft, the Schlastas grew to comprise over 10 percent of the air service's combat aircraft by the start of 1918.

== Bibliography ==
- Corum, James S. (2022). Bloody April 1917. Oxford: Osprey. ISBN 978-1472-85306-6.
- Franks, Norman; Guest, Russell; Bailey, Frank (2017). Bloody April 1917. Grub Street. ISBN 978-1-910690-41-3.
- Gray, Peter; Thetford, Owen (1962). German Aircraft of the First World War. London: Putman. OCLC 560204435.
- Jones, Henry Albert (1931). The War in the Air: Being the Story of the Part played in the Great War by the Royal Air Force. History of the Great War. Vol. III. London: Clarendon Press. OCLC 831226907.
- Levine, Joshua (2009). Fighter Heroes of WWI. London: Collins. ISBN 0-0072-7494-7.
- Hallion, Richard (1984). Rise of the Fighter Aircraft, 1914-18. Annapolis: Nautical & Aviation Pub. Co. of America. ISBN 0-9338-5242-8.
- Hart, Peter (2005). Bloody April: Slaughter in the Skies over Arras, 1917. London: Weidenfeld & Nicolson. ISBN 978-0-297-84621-5.
- Kilduff, Peter (1996). Germany's First Air Force 1914-1918. London: Arms & Armour. ISBN 1-85409-352-5.
- Morris, Alan (1968). Bloody April. Arrow Books. ISBN 978-0-09-000450-8.
- Wood, Alan C. (2002). Aces and Airmen of World War I. London: Brassey's. ISBN 1-8575-3380-1.
