= Aircraft camouflage =

Use of camouflage on military aircraft

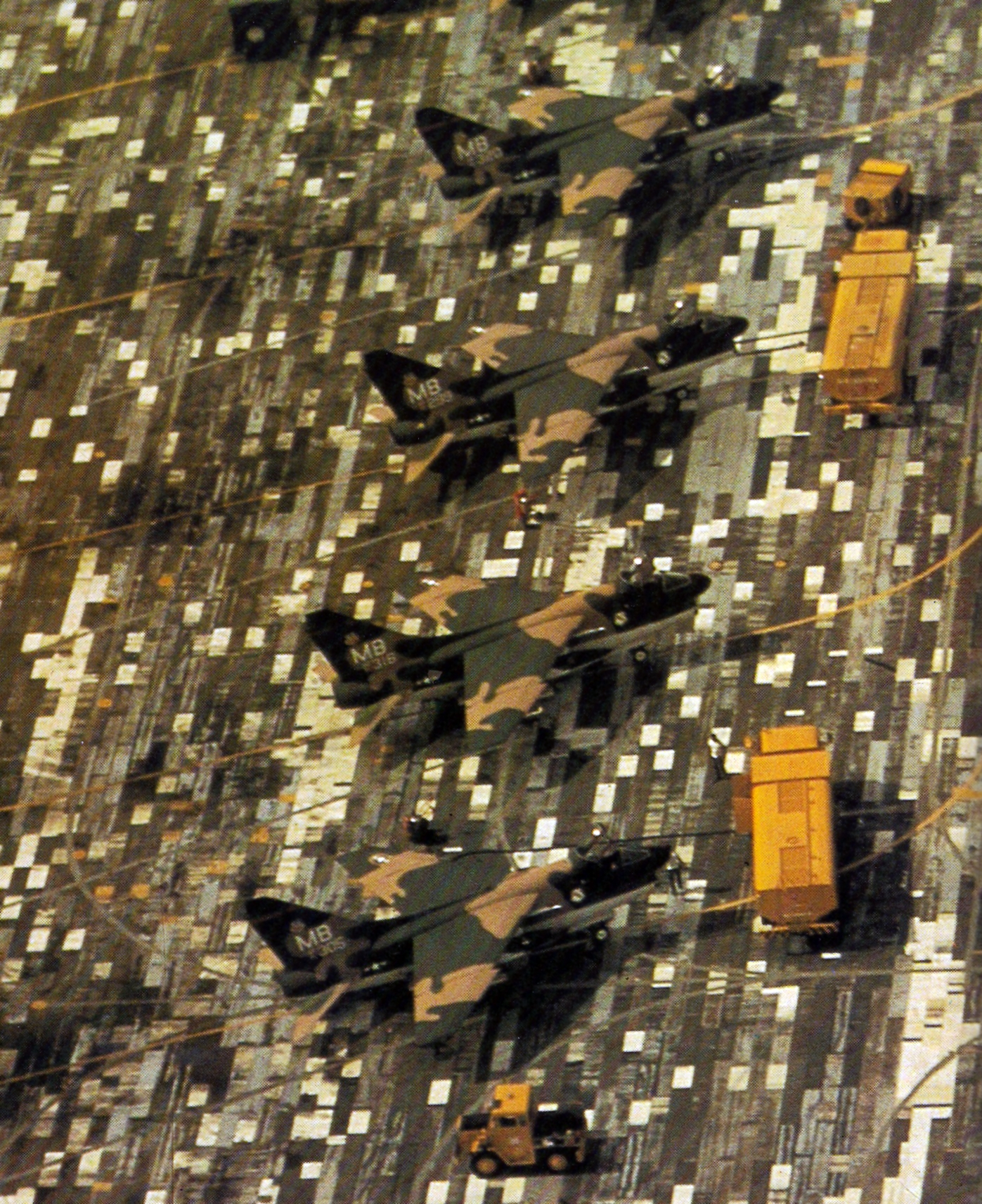
Disruptively camouflaged A-7D Corsairs on a disruptively painted concrete surface, Thailand, 1972

Aircraft camouflage is the use of camouflage on military aircraft to make them more difficult to see, whether on the ground or in the air. Given the possible backgrounds and lighting conditions, no single scheme works in every situation. A common approach has been a form of countershading, the aircraft being painted in a disruptive pattern of ground colours such as green and brown above, sky colours below. For faster and higher-flying aircraft, sky colours have sometimes been used all over, while helicopters and fixed-wing aircraft used close to the ground are often painted entirely in ground camouflage. Aircraft flying by night have often been painted black, but this actually made them appear darker than the night sky, leading to paler night camouflage schemes. There are trade-offs between camouflage and aircraft recognition markings, and between camouflage and weight. Accordingly, visible light camouflage has been dispensed with when air superiority was not threatened or when no significant aerial opposition was anticipated.

Aircraft were first camouflaged during World War I; aircraft camouflage has been widely employed since then. In World War II, disruptive camouflage became widespread for fighters and bombers, sometimes combined with countershading. Some air forces such as the German Luftwaffe varied their paint schemes to suit differing flight conditions such as the skyglow over German cities, or the sands of the Mediterranean front.

During and after World War II, the Yehudi lights project developed counter-illumination camouflage using lamps to increase the brightness of the aircraft to match the brightness of the sky. This was abandoned with improvements in radar, which seemed to render visible light camouflage redundant. However, aircraft continue to be painted in camouflage schemes; recent experiments have again explored active camouflage systems which allow colours, patterns and brightness to be changed to match the background, and some air forces have painted their fighters in digital camouflage patterns. Stealth technology, as in the Lockheed F-117 Nighthawk, aims to minimize an aircraft's radar cross-section and infrared signature, effectively providing multi-spectral camouflage at the price of reduced flying performance. Stealth may extend to avoiding or preventing vapour contrails.

== History ==
=== World War I ===
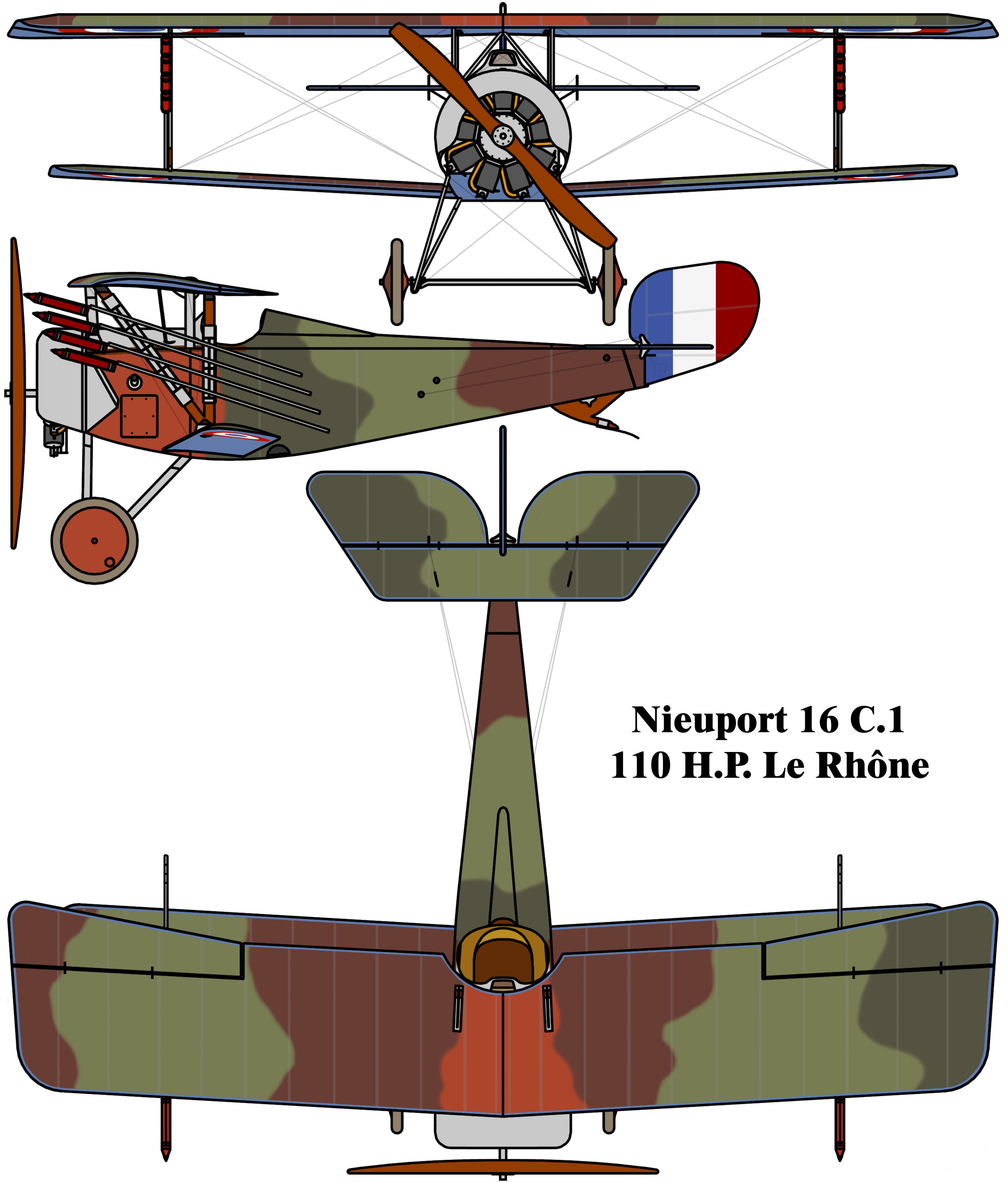
Disruptively patterned French Nieuport 16

The French were among the first to introduce camouflage, starting with Nieuport fighters with which they tested a variety of schemes during the Battle of Verdun in early 1916. A light blue-grey Nieuport 11 was flown by Georges Guynemer which he named Oiseau Bleu (Blue Bird) while some Voisin IIIs were also painted in the same colour. At the same time, disruptive schemes using several colours were also tried out. By mid-1916 a silver-grey aluminium dope became the norm for Nieuports until the French introduced a standardized disruptive camouflage scheme for combat aircraft in 1917. This was used widely on such aircraft as the Breguet XIV and SPAD XIII that consisted of dark and light green, dark and light brown, black (sometimes omitted) and an underside of grey or beige.

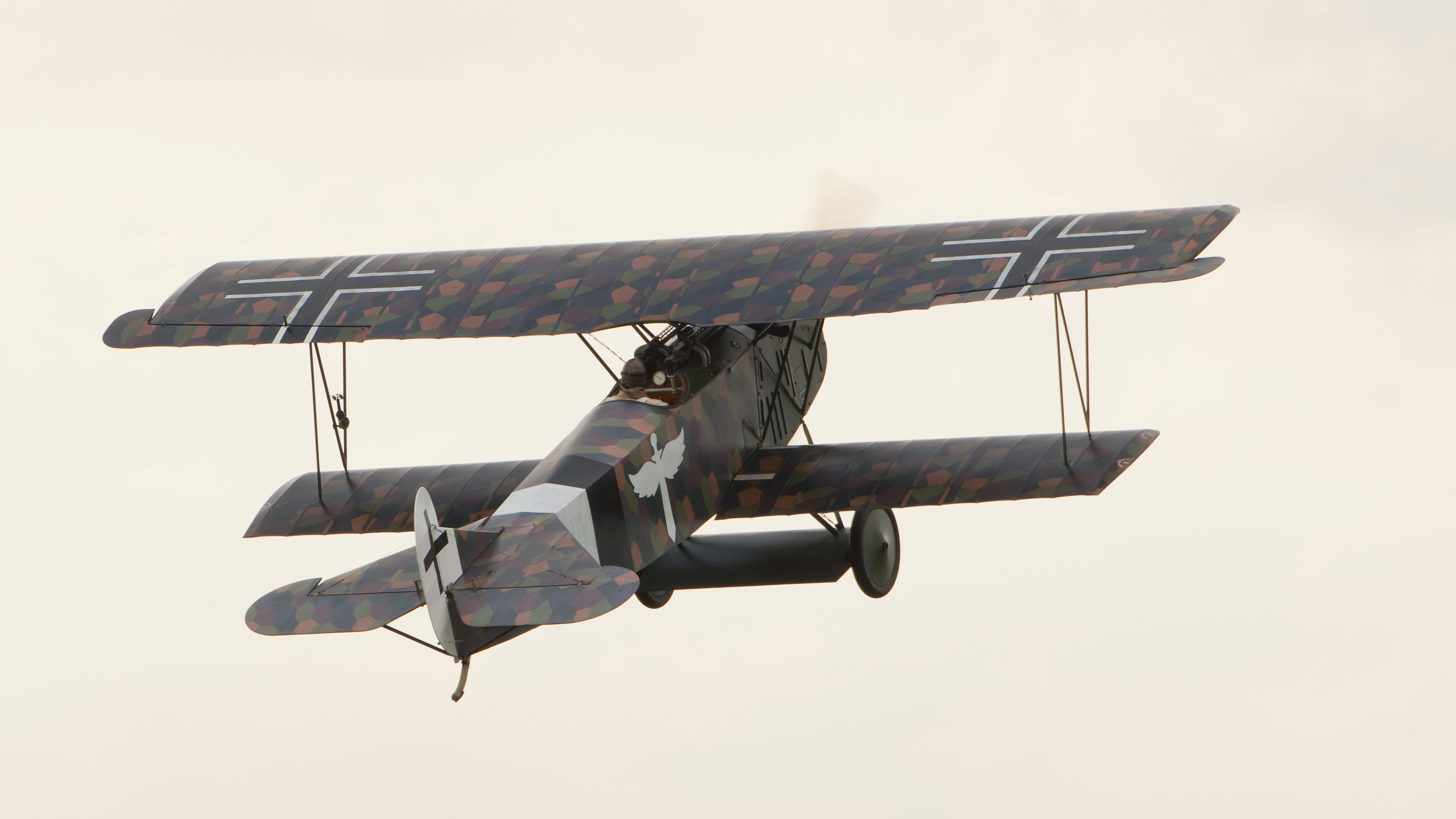
Fokker D.VII in lozenge camouflage

In mid-1916, the Germans experimented with a transparent cellulose acetate covering on several aircraft, including a Fokker E.III, that rendered the aircraft nearly invisible from most angles, however the sun reflecting off it defeated it even before its lack of durability did. When the Germans fielded the Albatros D.III biplane, pilots readily confused them with similarly shaped Nieuports which used the same combination of colours. The solution the Germans came up with was to replace the red-brown with purple, which from a distance still worked well as a camouflage colour, but could readily identify the aircraft as German. As in France, individual manufacturers applied a variety of camouflage finishes, dependent on their own interpretations of what was required. Light grey (LFG Roland C.II), patches of greens and browns (Fokker D.II) and streaky olive green finish over a turquoise base (Fokker Dr.I) were all used until April 1917, when pre-printed lozenge camouflage (Lozenge-Tarnung) was introduced with up to 5 colours.

Aircraft of the British Royal Flying Corps and Royal Naval Air Service were either coloured on top and sides with a protective dope called PC.10 (a mixture of yellow ochre and lampblack) or PC.12 (iron oxide and lamp black) while the undersides were given a clear dope. These colours were not intended originally as camouflage but were developed to prevent the fabric from being damaged by UV radiation from the sun, and their camouflage effect was an added bonus. Both services also used black for night bombers, while a wide variety of experimental camouflages were tried out for specific roles such as trench strafing, with multiple colours. Alternatives were tested in late 1917 at Orfordness Experimental Station, resulting in the introduction of NIVO (Night Invisible Varnish Orfordness) in early 1918; this was used for all external surfaces on night bombers until superseded by World War II colours. Ship-style dazzle camouflage was tested on aircraft such as Sopwith Camels, but was not used on operational aircraft.

=== World War II ===
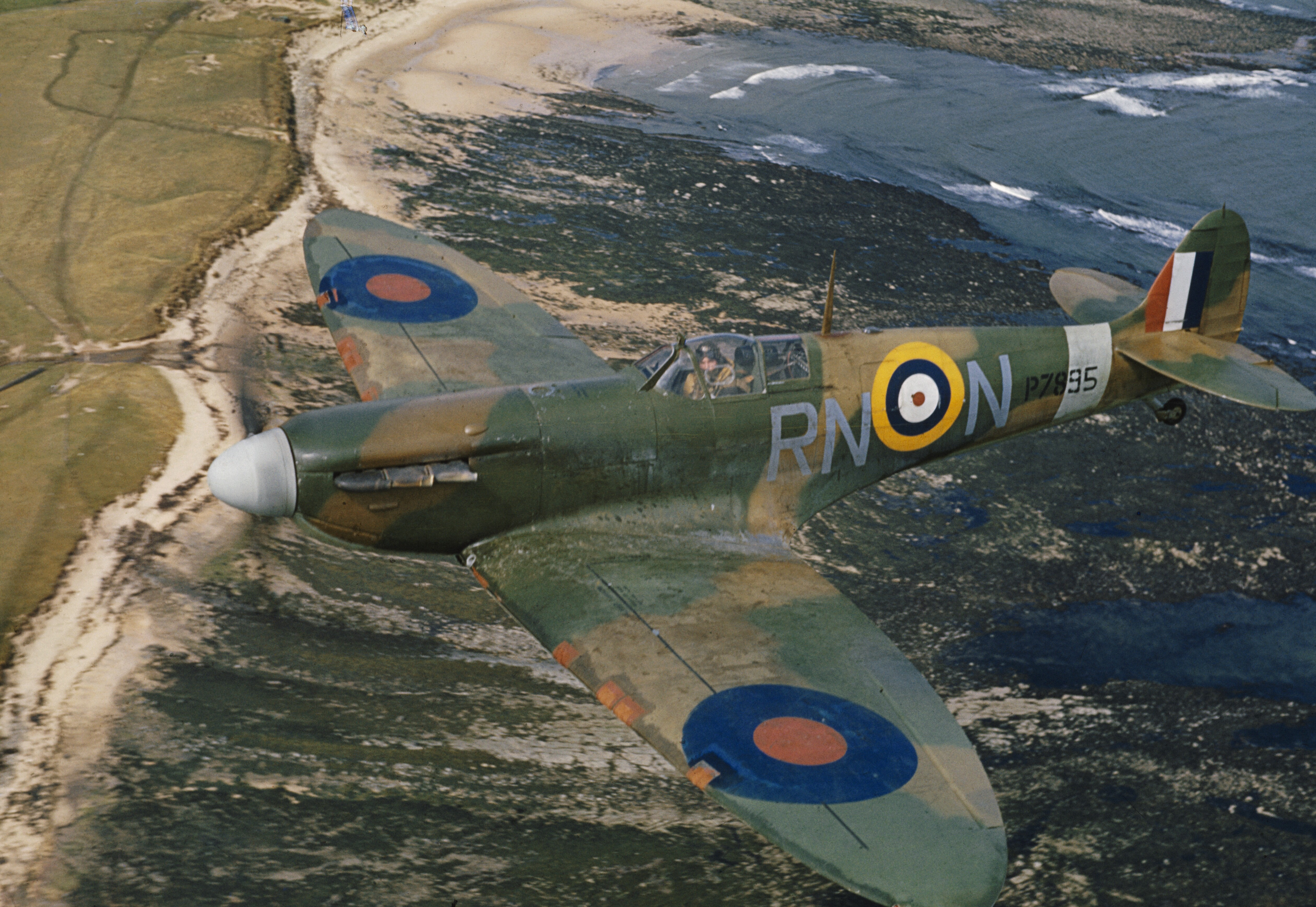
Supermarine Spitfire in disruptively patterned RAF 'Sand and Spinach' uppersurface camouflage, 1941

During the Munich Crisis of 1938, the Royal Air Force implemented plans to camouflage its aircraft in its disruptively patterned Temperate Land Scheme of "Dark Earth" and "Dark Green" above and "Sky" (similar to a duck egg blue) below. This scheme was known colloquially as "Sand and Spinach" when the pattern was painted on at the factory, large rubber mats serving as guides. For many types of aircraft, particularly fighters, the rubber mats were reversed for even and odd serials, named A and B patterns. The undersides, and lower half of the fuselage, of night bombers were painted black. Variations on fighters at the start of the war included painting the underside of one wing black. Later in the war the dark earth was replaced with "ocean grey" and the underside was "Sea Grey". Naval aircraft used two tones of grey over sky. Coastal Command, which carried out patrols for enemy vessel over the open sea, used white instead of sky. In the North Africa campaign a combination of "Dark Earth" and "Middle stone" were used for the top surfaces, the underside was "Azure blue". The same azure was used on day bombers overseas. High flying RAF Photographic Reconnaissance Unit aircraft were given an all over blue colour, but they were given "licence in the camouflaging" of their aircraft.

Some United States Army Air Forces aircraft used a variation of the British camouflage schemes (mostly on aircraft originally built to RAF orders) but most USAAF aircraft did not use multiple shades on the top side of the aircraft. Instead, most were camouflaged in olive drab above and neutral gray below, though some had the edges of flying surfaces painted in medium green. In the later stages of the war, camouflage was often dispensed with, both to save time in manufacturing and to reduce weight, leaving aircraft with a natural metal finish.

Soviet Air Forces aircraft were painted with shades of green, either plain or in disruptive patterns above, and blue-grey on the undersurfaces.

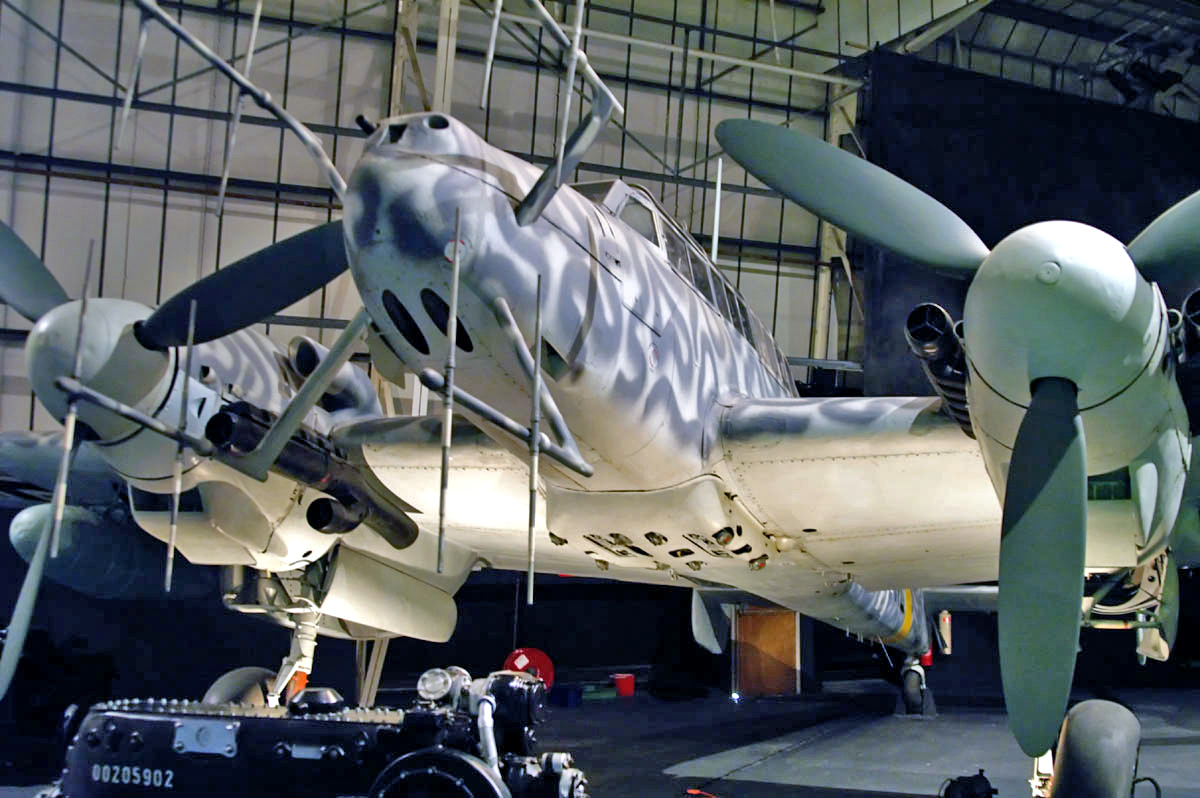
Countershaded Messerschmitt Bf 110G night fighter, with pale underside to match skyglow

The basic German (Luftwaffe) camouflage during most of the war was based on a light blue undersurface and a two tone splinter pattern of various greens for the upper surfaces. In the first year of the war, the top colours were dark green and black-green; later, lighter and more greyish colours were used for fighters, though bombers mostly maintained the dark green/black green camouflage. The side of the fuselage on fighters and some light bombers often had irregular patches sprayed on, softening the transition from the upper to the lower surface. The undersides of night bombers and night fighters were painted black early in the war, but by 1943 switched to lighter base colours of their usual light blue undersurfaces for aircraft flown by day, and a light gray base coat over the upper surfaces to match the skyglow over the German cities they were tasked with defending. A special pattern was devised for the Mediterranean front, consisting of a sand yellow that often faded to tan, with or without olive green patches. As Germany lost air supremacy, ground camouflage became increasingly important, and late war fighters received a two tone scheme like the British Sand and Spinach, in dark brown and light green.

=== Cold War and after ===
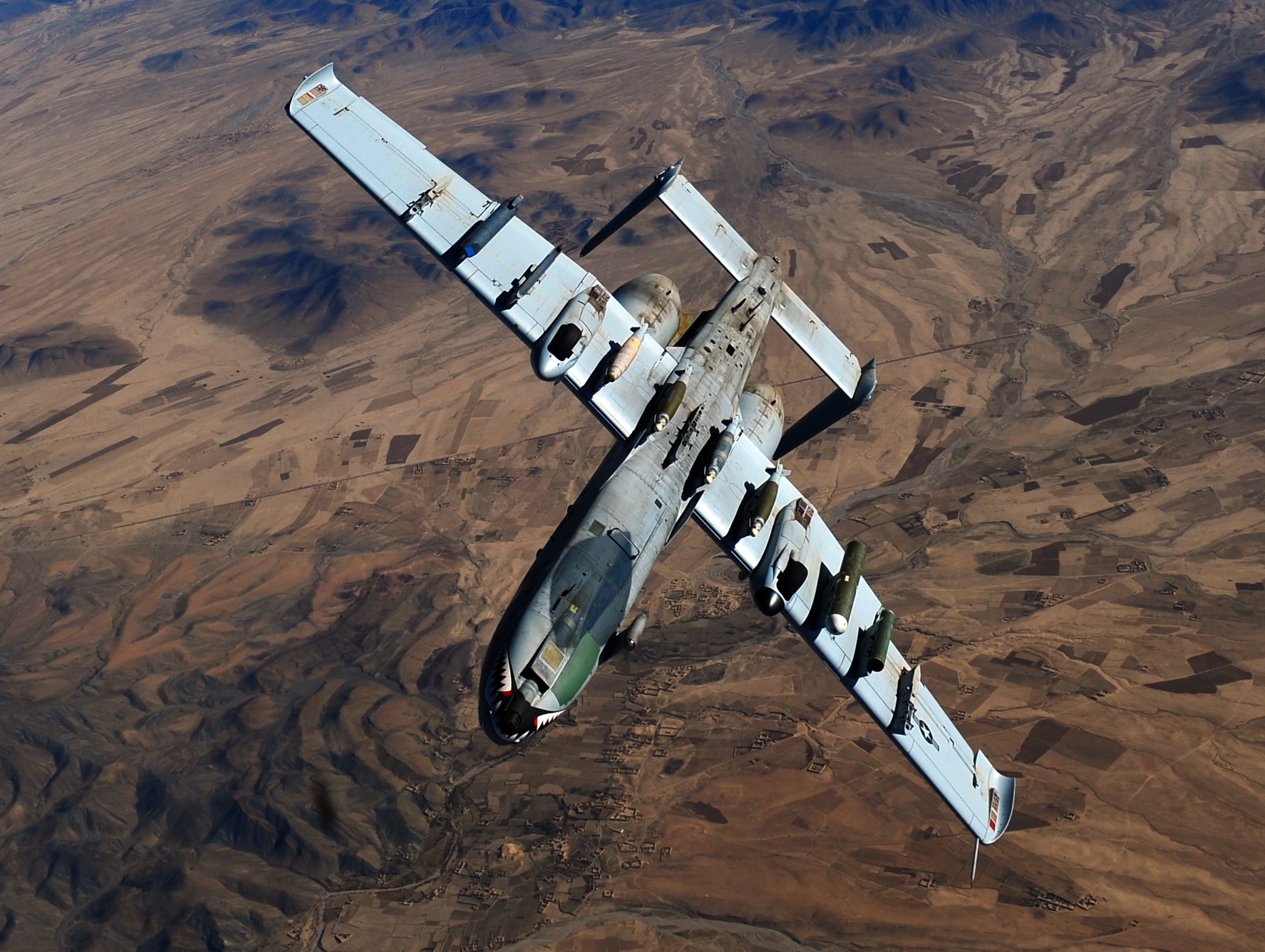
Automimicry: underside of A-10 Thunderbolt II with false canopy painted in, as if the plane was the right way up

During the Cold War, camouflage was partially abandoned; for example, glossy anti-flash white was used on aircraft as protection from nuclear flash, including high-flying Royal Air Force nuclear weapon-carrying V-bombers. When SAMs made high level attack too dangerous, the plans for RAF bombers changed to low level attack and camouflaged top surfaces returned. Apart from American and Soviet strategic forces, however, camouflage continued to be applied tactically. For example, in the Korean War, American B-29 bombers were switched to night flying with black undersides when Chinese fighters became a significant threat. In the Vietnam War, North Vietnamese MiG-21 fighters were painted by hand in green ground camouflage patterns, while the USAAF and US Navy both restarted experiments with painted camouflage. In the Soviet–Afghan War, Soviet Mil Mi-24 helicopters were camouflaged in a sand and spinach pattern.

In the 1970s, heat-seeking missiles were developed that had a range greater than the visual acuity of pilots. Aircraft camouflage now had two major threats that it was not able to fully defeat—radar and infrared detection. Camouflage accordingly became less important. However, by the 1980s, the human eye was again seen as sufficiently important a threat that aircraft like the ground attack A-10 Thunderbolt (Warthog) were painted in camouflage schemes that included both disruptive ground coloration and automimicry (deceptive self-imitation), in the form of a false canopy on the underside.

== Methods ==
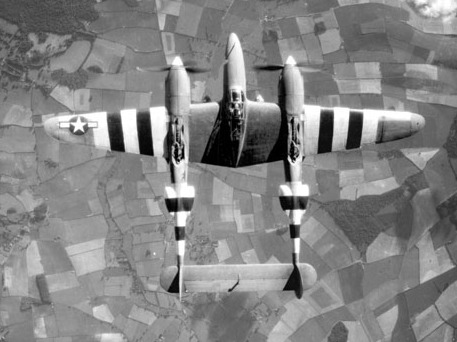
Aircraft camouflage has a trade-off with recognition markings with unambiguity but high visibility, such as this Lockheed F-5 Lightning (P-38 Lightning reconnaissance version) with invasion stripes used so that allied planes would not be mistaken for the enemy during the 1944 Allied invasion of France.

Camouflage for aircraft is complicated by the fact that the aircraft's background varies widely, depending on the location of the observer, the nature of the background and the aircraft's motion. For this reason, military aircraft were often painted to match the sky when viewed from below, and to either match the ground or break up the aircraft's outline when viewed from above. This is a form of countershading, likely to work best on aircraft such as heavy bombers that do not fly inverted during combat. Because of the way light hits it, patterns of dark and light will often be present on an aircraft even if it is entirely one colour, making it easier to see Reflections and specular highlights can be counteracted by painting an aircraft in neutral shades with a non-reflective, matte finish. There is a trade-off between the effectiveness of camouflage and the size of recognition markings: larger markings reduce the risk of friendly fire through misrecognition, but compromise camouflage.

=== Ground camouflage ===
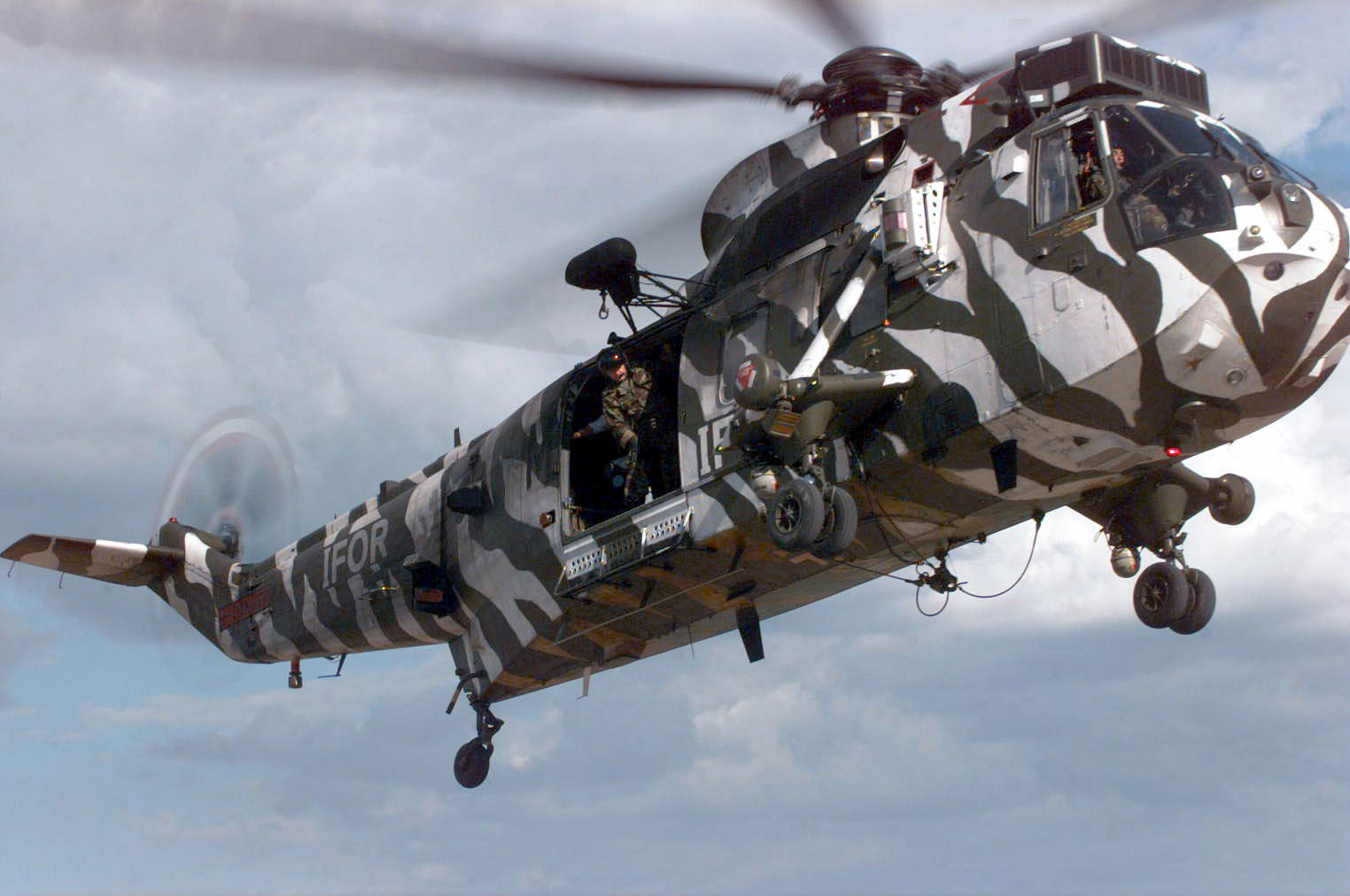
Sea King helicopter in snow camouflage

Ground camouflage is used to delay visual acquisition from the air of an aircraft that is on or near the ground. Light sand has been used for aircraft used over deserts, blues and greys for aircraft over the sea, and greens and browns for aircraft that are expected to operate in forested areas. However, a camouflaged aircraft either on the ground or flying low over the ground in bright sunlight remains vulnerable to being detected from above because of its own shadow cast on the ground. This can reduce an aircraft's camouflage effectiveness at altitudes up to 3,000 feet (910 m), particularly if the ground surface is pale and relatively uniform. Helicopters are often painted in ground camouflage, sometimes in regional or seasonal forms such as snow camouflage. Fixed-wing aircraft, too, are occasionally painted with snow camouflage, as for example on Soviet fighters and Luftwaffe Stukas on the Eastern Front in winter, in Swedish trials in 1970, and RAF Jaguars on exercise in Norway. (Note: A Jaguar in a winter scheme can be seen at File:Sepecat Jaguar GR1A, UK - Air Force AN1985498.jpg.)

=== Air camouflage ===
Camouflage for an airborne aircraft may attempt to provide concealment with colours resembling the background. For example, until 1941, Royal Air Force fighters were painted in ground colours (dark green and brown) above, and sky colours below. However, aircraft were being lost, and pilots reported that the colours used made their fighters conspicuously darker than the sky. The Air Fighting Development Unit at RAF Duxford studied the problem, and in the summer of 1941 replaced the dark brown with a paler colour, "ocean grey"; the sky blue on the underside was similarly replaced by a paler "sea grey" to reduce visibility against the bright sky. Similar adjustments were made by the Luftwaffe. Towards the end of the war, allied air superiority made visible light camouflage less important, and some American aircraft were flown in unpainted (silver coloured) metal to save weight. (Note: The weight saved and any consequent improvement in speed or range depends on the aircraft type. Defense Media Network calculated that a Boeing B-17 Flying Fortress carried some 300 pounds of paint, on the basis of a painted area of 4200 square feet. That needed some 35 gallons of lead-based paint weighing some 10 pounds per gallon, giving a wet weight of 350 pounds and a dry weight of perhaps 300 pounds after evaporation. The article noted that contemporary reports were more conservative, estimating 15–20 pounds for a fighter, 70–80 pounds for a bomber. Planes with polished surfaces tested by both RAF and Proving Ground Command flew up to 8 mph (13 km/h) faster.)

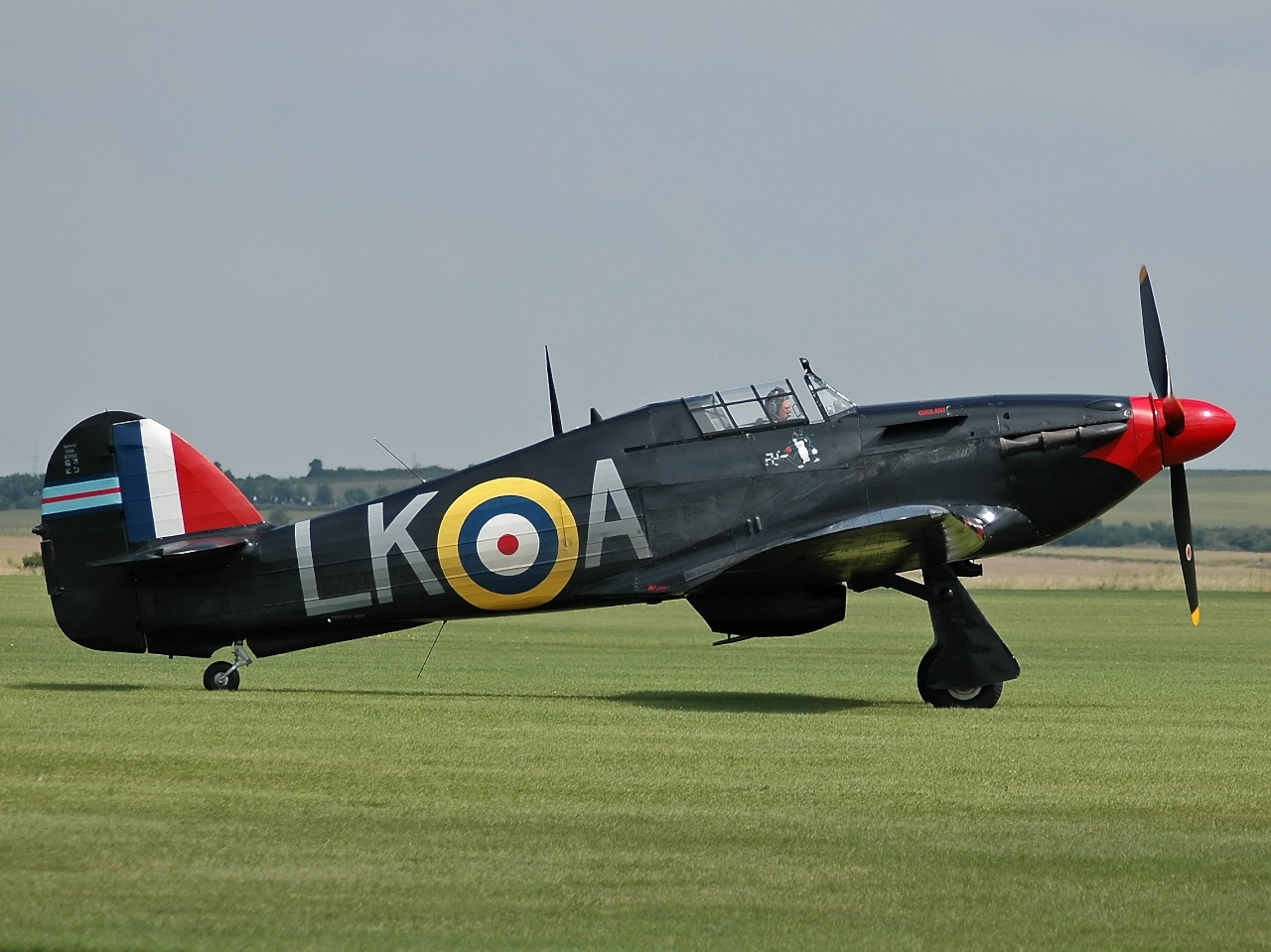
World War II Hawker Hurricane night fighter in overall black camouflage

=== Night camouflage ===
Military aircraft flying at night have often been painted black or other dark colours, applied to just the underside of some aircraft and to the entirety of others, in the hope of reducing the risk of being seen in enemy searchlights or by night fighters. However, aircraft camouflaged with black paint are actually darker than the night sky, making them more visible to observers not using searchlights. The undersides of Heinkel He 111 night bombers were painted black. The De Havilland Mosquito was similarly initially painted black when used as a night fighter; matte black was found to be the best at reducing the aircraft's visibility against searchlights, but the aircraft's speed was reduced by 15 mph (24 km/h) compared to glossy black, which, being smoother, produced less drag. Since, however, black camouflage made the planes conspicuous on moonlit nights and against cloud, a variation of a day camouflage scheme was eventually chosen.

=== Active camouflage ===
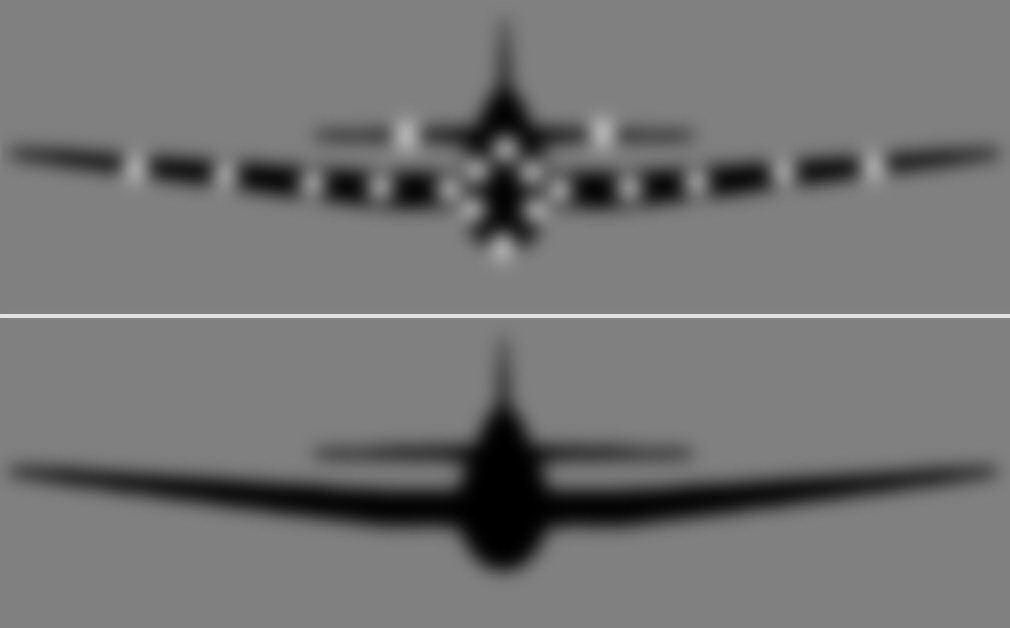
Yehudi lights raised the average brightness of an aircraft to match the sky.

In the early years of World War II, German U-boats often escaped attack by aircraft because they spotted the aircraft while it was still far away as a black dot in the sky, no matter what camouflage colours were used. To solve this problem, in 1943 the U.S. Navy, following the Canadian diffused lighting camouflage trials on warships, conducted secret experiments on counter-illumination in the Yehudi lights project. Sealed beam lights were mounted on the leading edge of the wing of a Grumman TBM-3D Avenger, and around its engine cowling, with the lamps facing forward. (Note: In a crosswind, pilots had to fly with sideslip to keep the aircraft nose and Yehudi lights pointed towards the target.) The intensity of the lamps was adjusted to match the background sky as seen from an observer in a surface ship. Aircraft with Yehudi lights were not detected until 2 miles (3.2 km) away under conditions where aircraft without the lights were detected 12 miles (19 km) away. Though successful, the system was not put into production because of improved radar detection.

During the Vietnam War, Yehudi lights were again tried, this time mounted to an F-4 Phantom painted in a dull blue-and-white camouflage pattern. The experiment reduced by 30% the distance at which an observer visually acquired the Phantom. In 1997, active camouflage was again investigated, this time with thin computer-controlled fluorescent panels or light-emitting polymer covering much of an aircraft's surface.

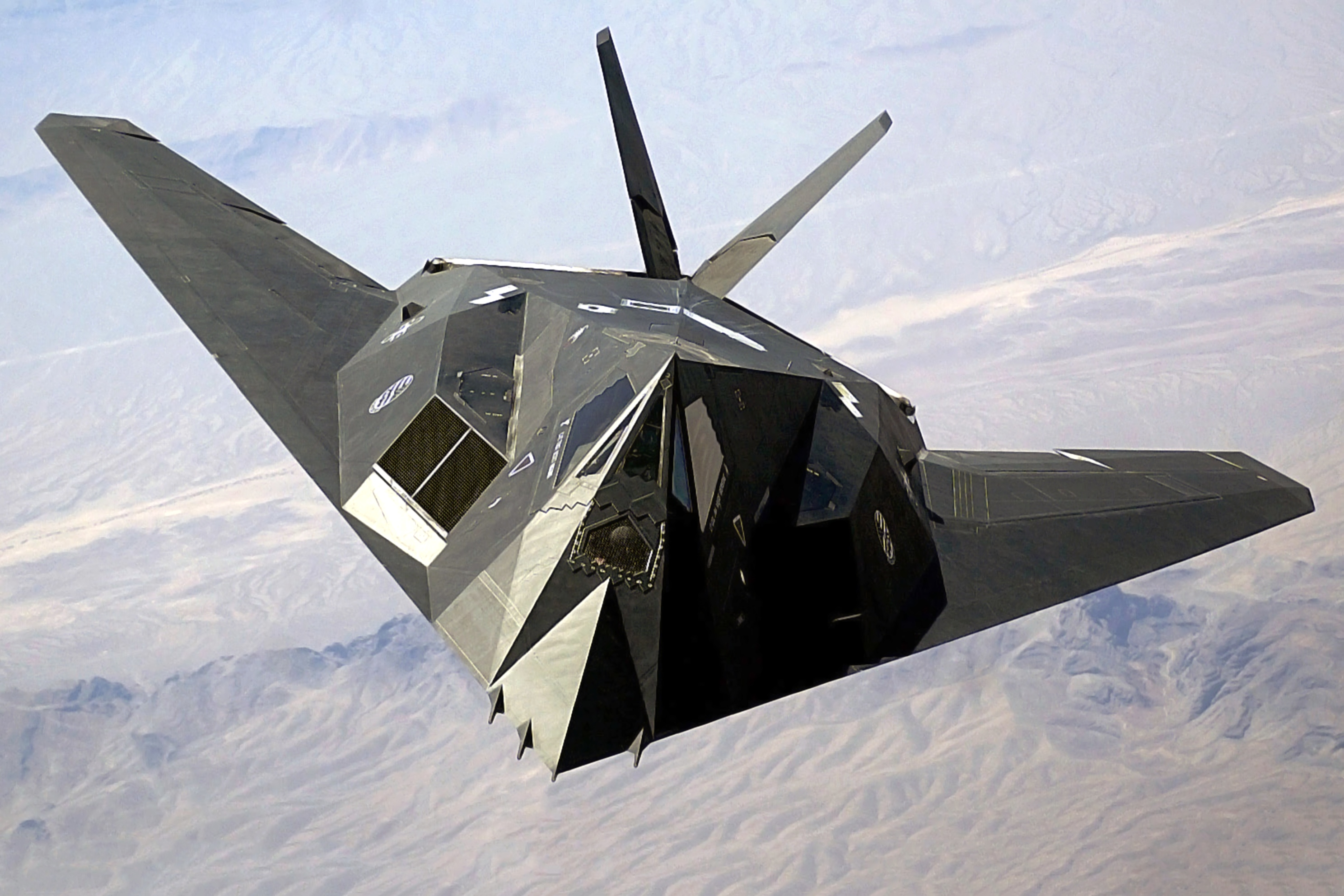
Lockheed F-117 Nighthawk, the first operational aircraft to use stealth technology to minimize its radar cross-section

=== Stealth technology ===
Stealth technology aims to make aircraft almost undetectable by radar or other sensors, whether infrared, visible, or acoustic. This is effectively multi-spectral camouflage. Work began on stealth technology in America in 1958.

The Lockheed F-117 Nighthawk was the first operational aircraft designed to use stealth technology to minimize its radar cross-section; it began operations in secrecy in 1983. Its low detectability was traded-off against performance in other areas, including reduced thrust and only subsonic speed. The aircraft's faceted shape reduced the reflection of radar back to the receiver, at the expense of making the aircraft aerodynamically unstable, requiring a fly-by-wire flight system to maintain controlled flight. The infrared signatures of stealth aircraft can be reduced by designing exhaust nozzles to mix the hot gases with cool ambient air, or by placing the nozzles above the wing to conceal them from ground-based observers, as with the Northrop Grumman B-2 Spirit bomber.

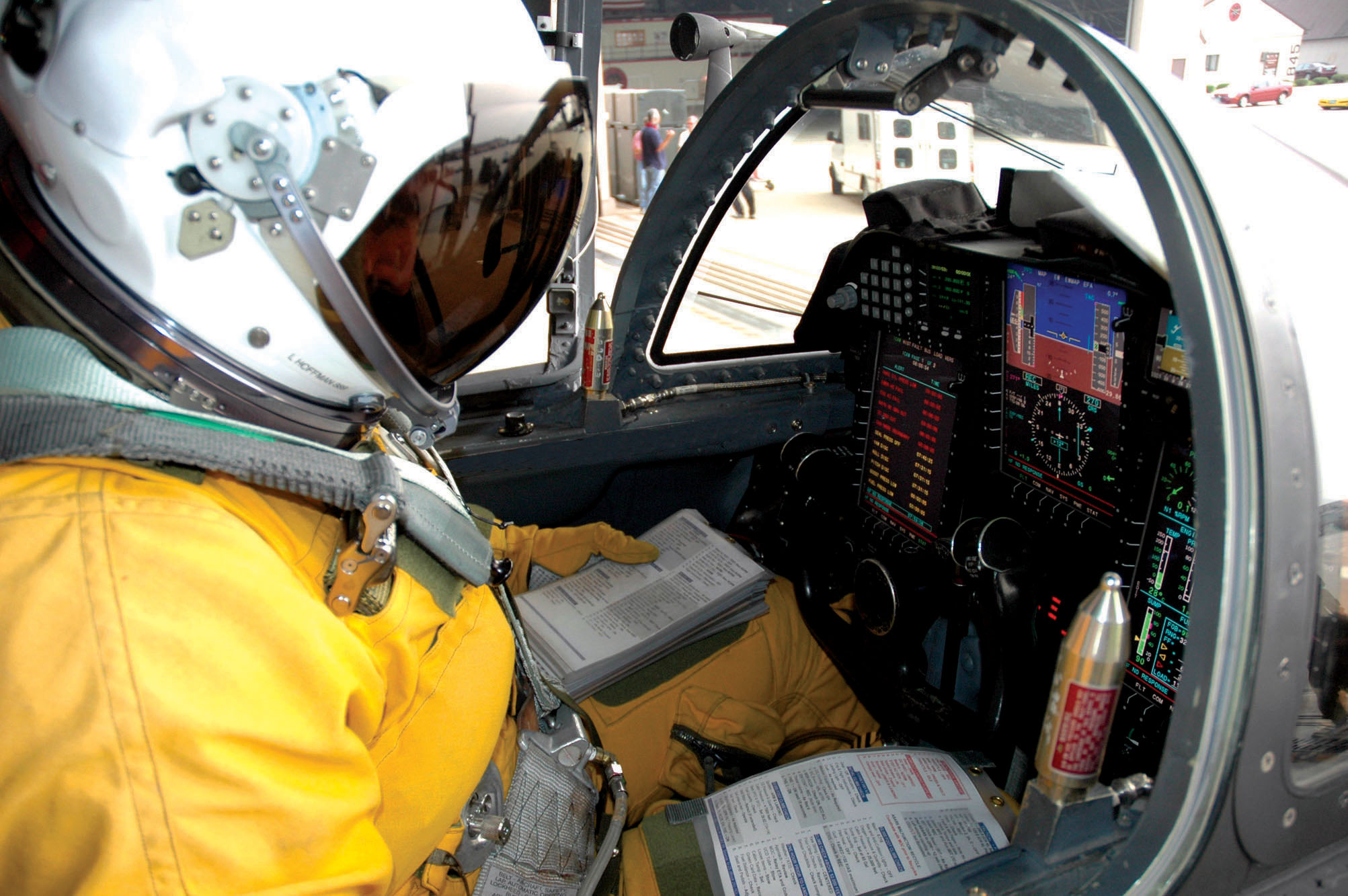
Lockheed U-2 had an external mirror (top, centre) enabling pilot to check for giveaway contrails.

=== Preventing contrails ===
Camouflage may extend beyond an aircraft's airframe. High-flying aircraft can sometimes be detected by their vapor contrails. Researchers have considered whether these might be reduced with the use of chemical additives. Work was carried out on a contrail management system for B-2 stealth bombers in 1994. From the Second World War onwards, reconnaissance pilots took care to avoid creating contrails, varying their altitude as necessary; the Lockheed U-2 reconnaissance aircraft was equipped with a mirror to enable the pilot to see if the plane was creating a contrail, and to take action accordingly.

=== Digital camouflage ===
Digital camouflage patterns, widely used for uniforms with designs such as CADPAT and MARPAT, have been applied to the aircraft of some armed forces. For example, in 2008 Slovakia repainted its MiG-29 fighters in a disruptive pattern designed by HyperStealth, "Digital Thunder". In 2017, a prototype of the Russian air force's Sukhoi Su-57 flew with a countershaded digital camouflage scheme, all dark above except for a multi-scale pattern at the edges.

== See also ==
- Aircraft livery

== Sources ==
- Dougherty, Martin J. (2017). Camouflage At War: An Illustrated Guide from 1914 to the Present Day. Amber Books. ISBN 978-1-78274-498-6.
- Newark, Tim (2007). Camouflage. Thames and Hudson, with Imperial War Museum. ISBN 978-0-500-51347-7.
- Shaw, Robert (1985). Fighter combat: tactics and maneuvering. Naval Institute Press. ISBN 0-87021-059-9.
