= Julius Schmidt (aviator) =

German World War I flying ace

- Born: Unknown; Kingdom of Saxony
- Died: 2 July 1944
- Military career
- Allegiance: Germany
- Branch: Aviation
- Rank: Leutnant
- Units: Fliegerersatz-Abteilung 6, Kampfgeschwader 4, Jagdstaffel 6, Jagdstaffel 3
- Awards: Military Order of Saint Henry, Royal House Order of Hohenzollern, Iron Cross

Leutnant Julius Schmidt was a World War I flying ace credited with 15 confirmed and three unconfirmed aerial victories.

== Biography ==
See also Aerial victory standards of World War I

Julius Schmidt was serving with Kampfgeschwader 4 (Tactical Bomber Wing 4) when he downed his first enemy aircraft on 12 May 1916. He would transfer to a fighter squadron, Jagdstaffel 3. While with them, he would destroy an observation balloon on 26 April 1917, then reel off a string of a dozen more victories by 11 September. On the 24th, he was severely wounded and removed from duty. Upon recovery, he would be transferred to Jagdstaffel 6. He scored no further victories with them, and may not have been on flying status.
