= Georges Guynemer =

French World War I flying ace

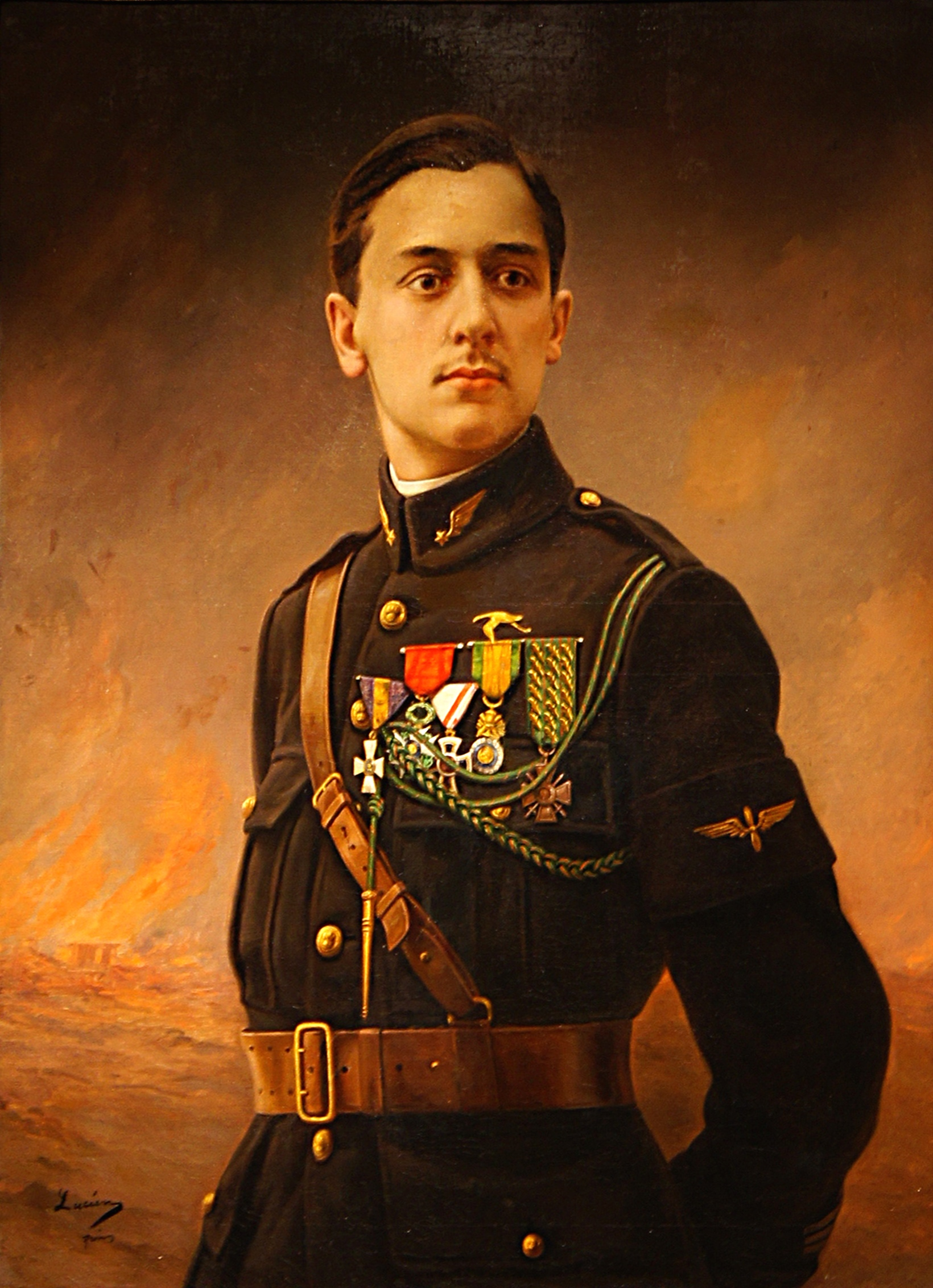
- G. Guynemer by Lucien, Musée national de la Légion d'Honneur et des Ordres de Chevalerie
- Born: 24 December 1894; Paris, France
- Died: 11 September 1917 (aged 22); South of Poelcappelle, Belgium (presumably)
- Military career
- Allegiance: France
- Branch: French Air Service
- Service years: 1914–1917
- Rank: Capitaine
- Unit: Escadrille N.3, MS 3, Spa3
- Awards: Légion d'honneur Croix de Guerre; Médaille militaire Order of Karađorđe's Star

Georges Marie Lodovic Jules Guynemer (French pronunciation: [ʒɔʁʒ ɡinmɛːʁ], 24 December 1894 – 11 September 1917 MIA) was the second highest-scoring French fighter ace with 54 victories during World War I, and a French national hero at the time of his death. Guynemer's death was a profound shock to France.

== Early life and military career ==
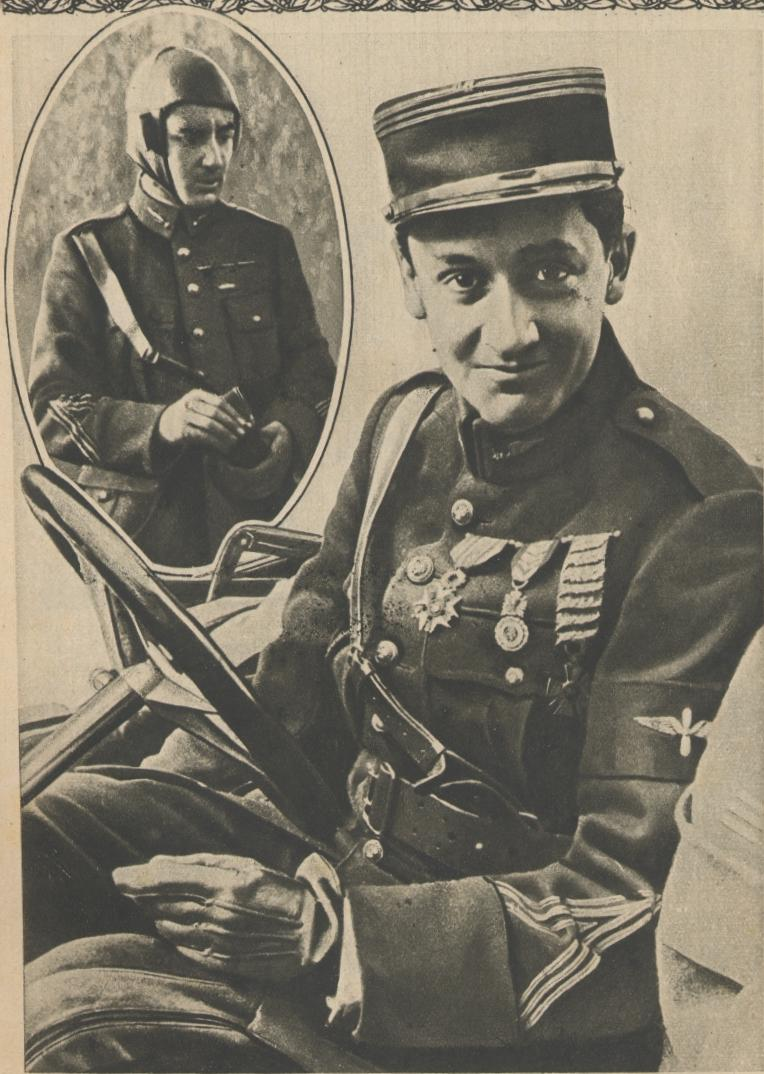
Georges Guynemer in 1917

Georges Marie Ludovic Jules Guynemer was born in Paris to a wealthy and aristocratic family. His father was Paul Guynemer (1860-1922), a former officer of Saint-Cyr. His mother, Julie Noémi Doynel de Saint-Quentin (1866-1957), belonged to the old Norman nobility and was a descendant of Charles of Valois, founder of the royal house of Valois. Guynemer experienced an often sickly childhood. Nevertheless, he succeeded as an aviator through his enormous drive and self-confidence.

He was originally rejected five times for military service due to frailty, but was accepted for training as a mechanic in late 1914. With determination, he gained acceptance to pilot training, joining Escadrille MS.3 on 8 June 1915. He remained in the same unit for his entire service. The first plane allocated to him was a Morane-Saulnier L monoplane previously flown by Charles Bonnard, and accordingly named Vieux Charles (Old Charles). Guynemer kept the name and continued to use it for most of his later aircraft. On 19 July 1915, he shot down his first plane, a German Aviatik.

On 5 December 1915, the Escadrille MS.3 was renamed the Escadrille N.3, after being re-equipped with new Nieuport 10 fighters. Flying the more effective plane, Guynemer quickly established himself as one of France's premier fighter pilots. He became an ace, with his fifth victory coming in February 1916, and was promoted to lieutenant in March. On 12 March 1916 he scored his 8th victory. At the end of the year, his score had risen to 25. Capitaine Brocard, commander of Escadrille N.3 (Storks), described Guynemer at that time as "...my most brilliant Stork." Less than a year later, Guynemer was promoted to captain and commander of the Storks squadron.

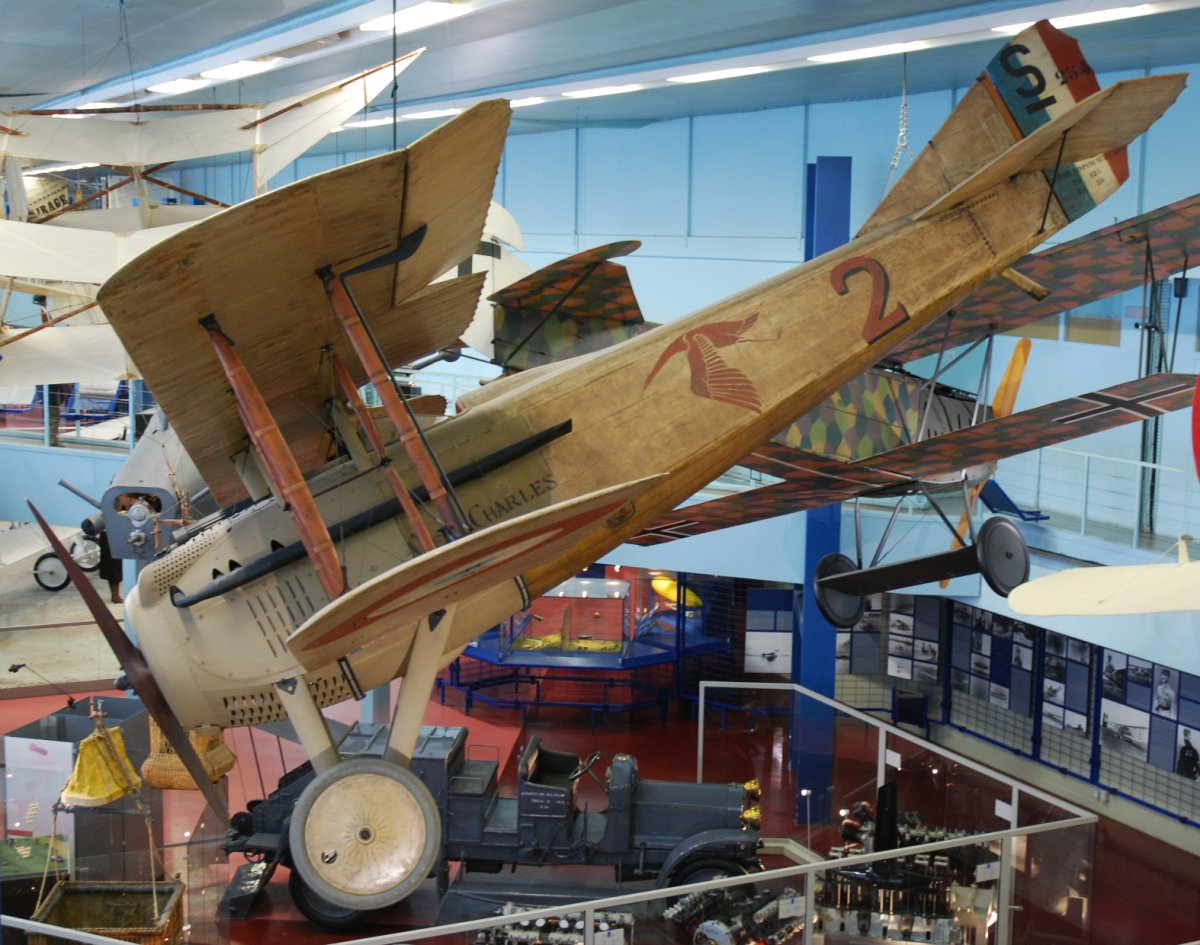
Georges Guynemer's original SPAD S.VII, nicknamed "Vieux Charles", preserved at Musée de l'Air et de l'Espace

Guynemer became influential enough to affect French fighter aircraft design. In December 1916, he wrote a letter to the chief designer at Spad, criticizing the Spad VII as inferior to the German Halberstadt that was its contemporary. As a consequence, Spad developed two new but very similar models, the SPAD XII and SPAD XIII. The new models were promising, but had teething problems with the reduction gear between engine and propeller.

On 23 January 1917 Guynemer scored a "double" credit of victories 26 and 27, first shooting down an Albatros C piloted by Captain Martin Korner, who was killed, followed by a Rumpler C I of Flieger-Abteilung (A) 216 piloted by Lt. Bernhard Röder and his observer Lt. Otto von Schanzenbach who were both killed. On 26 January 1917 Guynemer forced down an Albatros C.VII of Flieger-Abteilung (A) 226 whose crew was captured for his 30th credit. On 8 February 1917, flying a SPAD VII, Guynemer became the first Allied pilot to shoot down a German Gotha bomber, his 31st victory. On 16 March 1917 he brought down his 32nd credit, a Roland D.II of Jasta 32 whose pilot was captured. On 14 April 1917 he downed his 36th credit, by killing a crew from Flieger-Abteilung (A) 254. His highest scoring month was May 1917, when he downed seven German aircraft including a quadruple credit on 25 May. By July, he began to fly the Spad XII; his avion magique was, at his behest, armed with a 37 mm (1.46 in) cannon whose barrel fired through the propeller shaft. It was also armed with a .30 in (7.62 mm) air-cooled Vickers machine gun. Although the cannon promised devastating firepower, the new plane was a handful because of it, as the cannon's rearwards-protruding breech mandated separate aileron and elevator controls split from each other on opposing sides of the cockpit. The single shot cannon had to also be manually reloaded in flight; it had a heavy recoil when fired and filled the canopy with fumes with every shot. The Spad XII was not a plane for a novice pilot. However, Guynemer used it to down an Albatros fighter on 27 July, and a DFW the next day. The latter triumph made him the first French ace to attain 50 victories, with headlines such as "Fifty machines destroyed! This had been Guynemer's dream!" written in the newspapers.

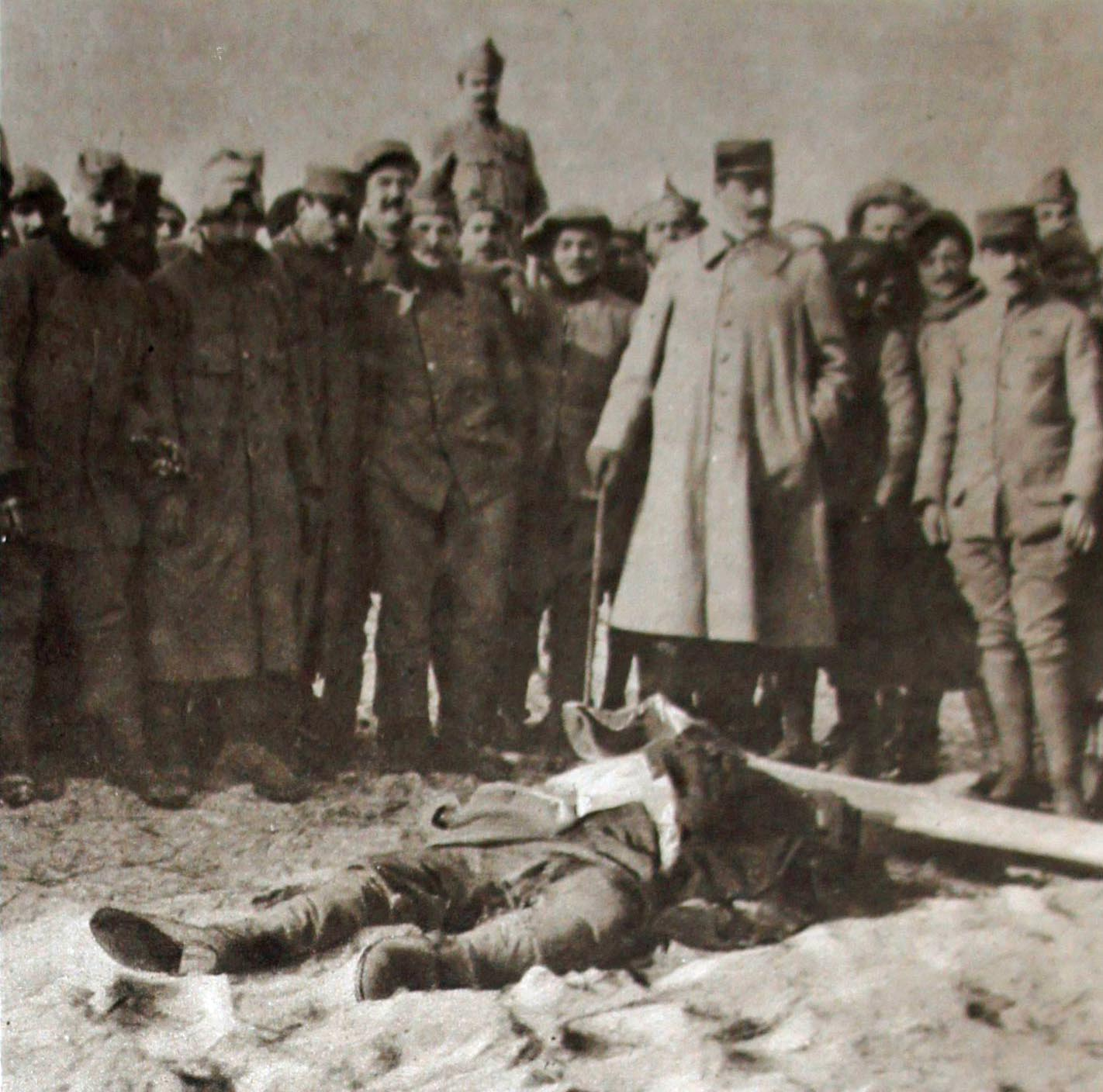
"The body of the German pilot" (Guynemer's 26th air victory—23 January 1917. Captain Martin Korner killed

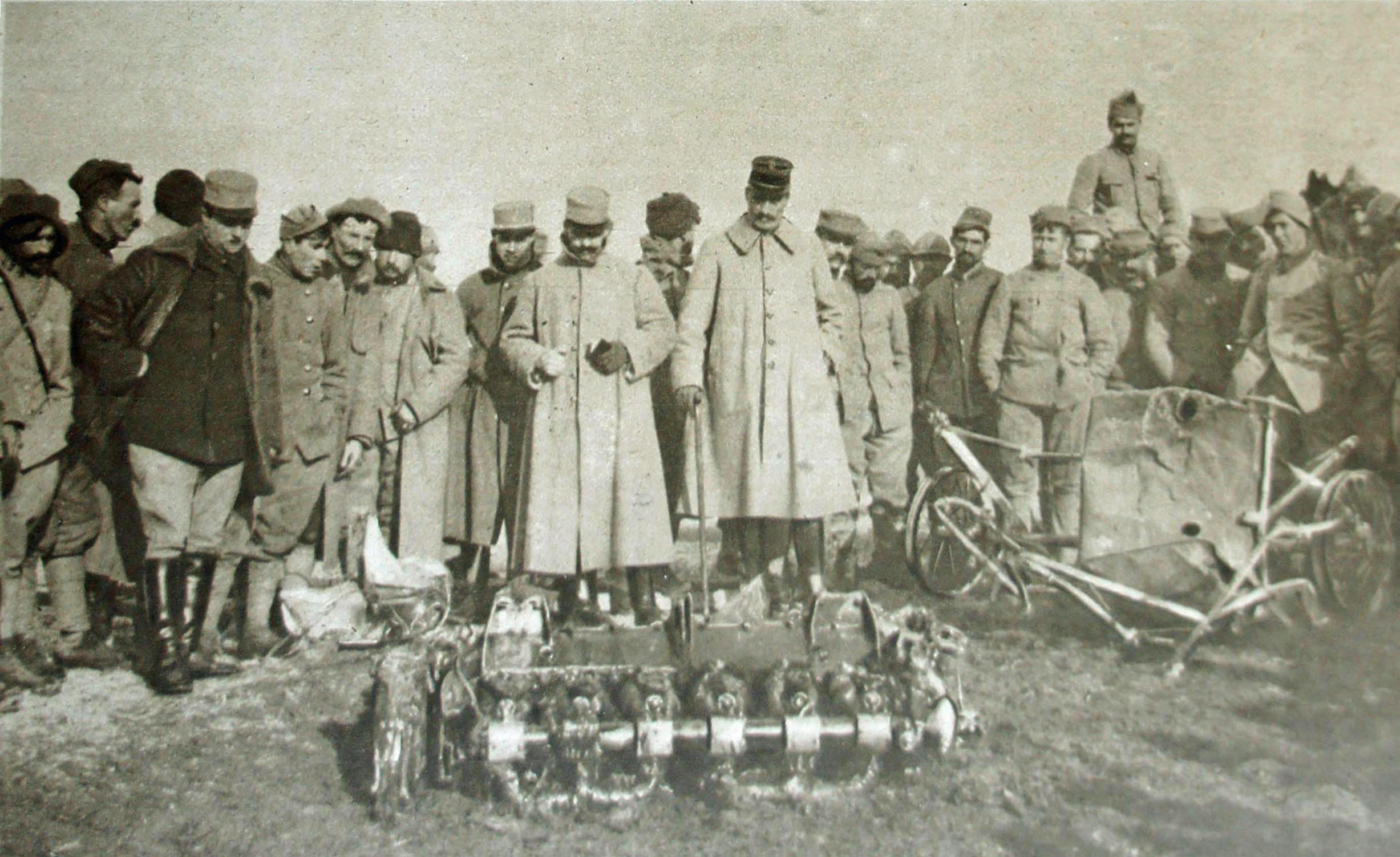
"Commandant Brocard chief of Guynemer in front of the aircraft shot down" (Guynemer's 26th air victory—23 January 1917. The 27th victory from Flieger-Abteilung (A) 216 burned [Crew killed]

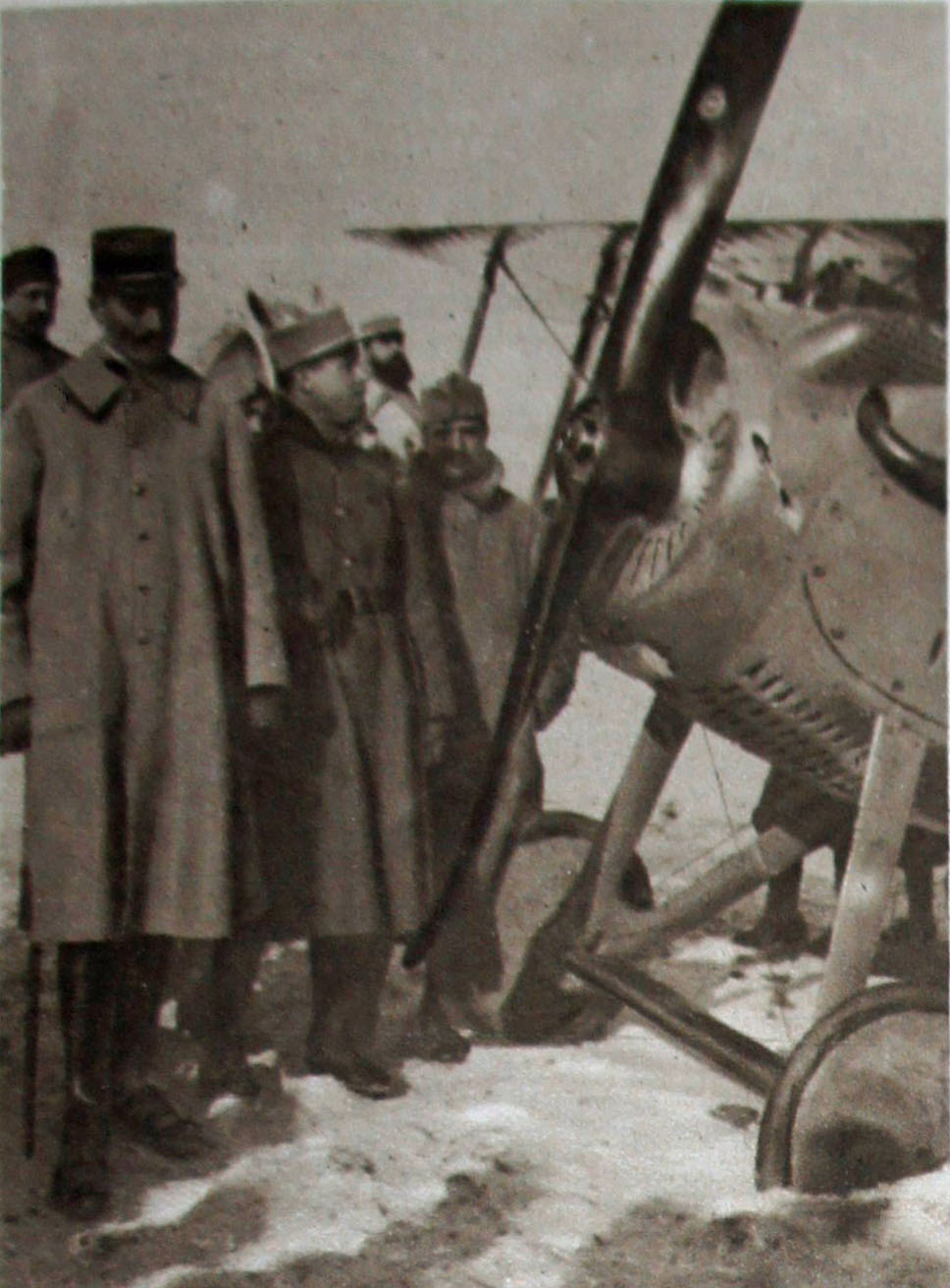
"The front is his plane scratched by a bullet during the fight"[23 January 1917]

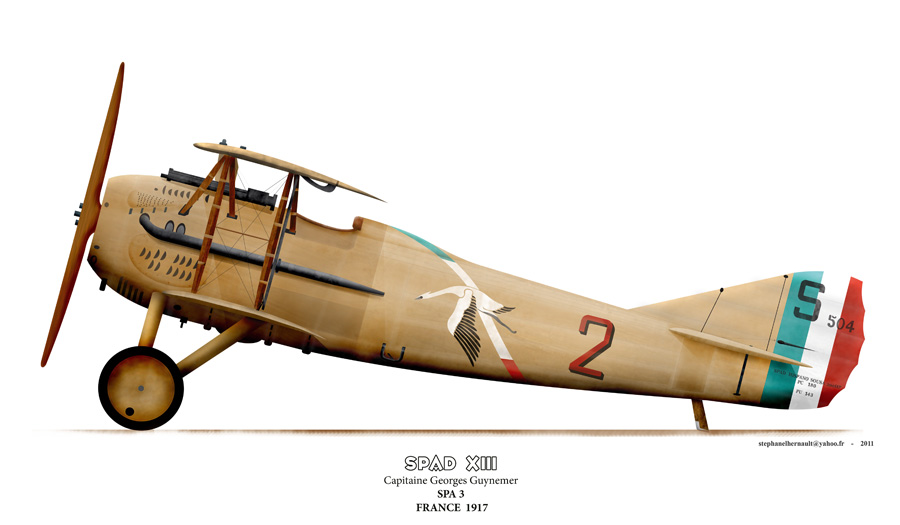
Georges Guynemer's SPAD XIII bears typical markings for his squadron

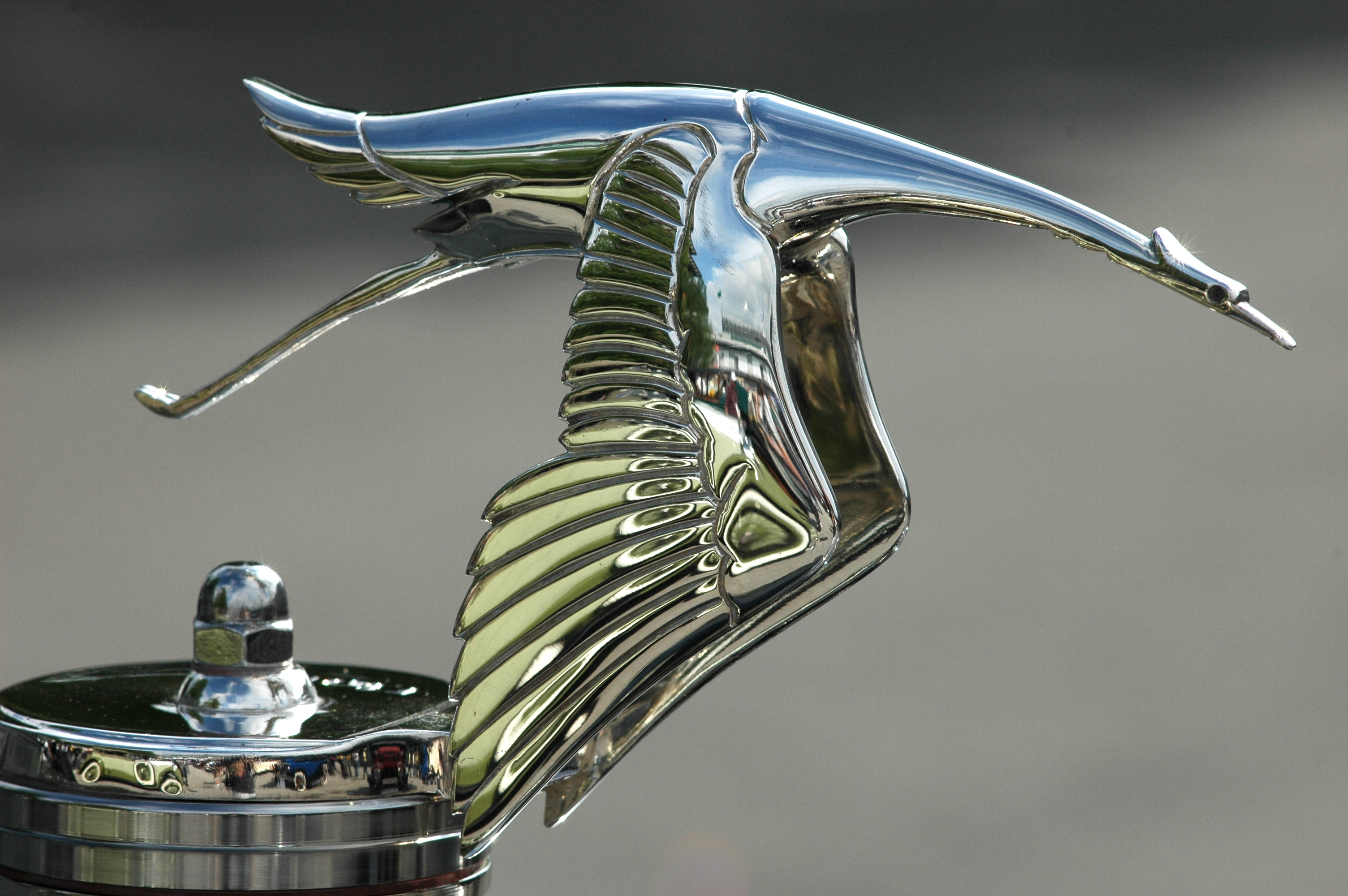
Hispano-Suiza stork hood ornament styled after Guynemer's squadron emblem

== Death ==
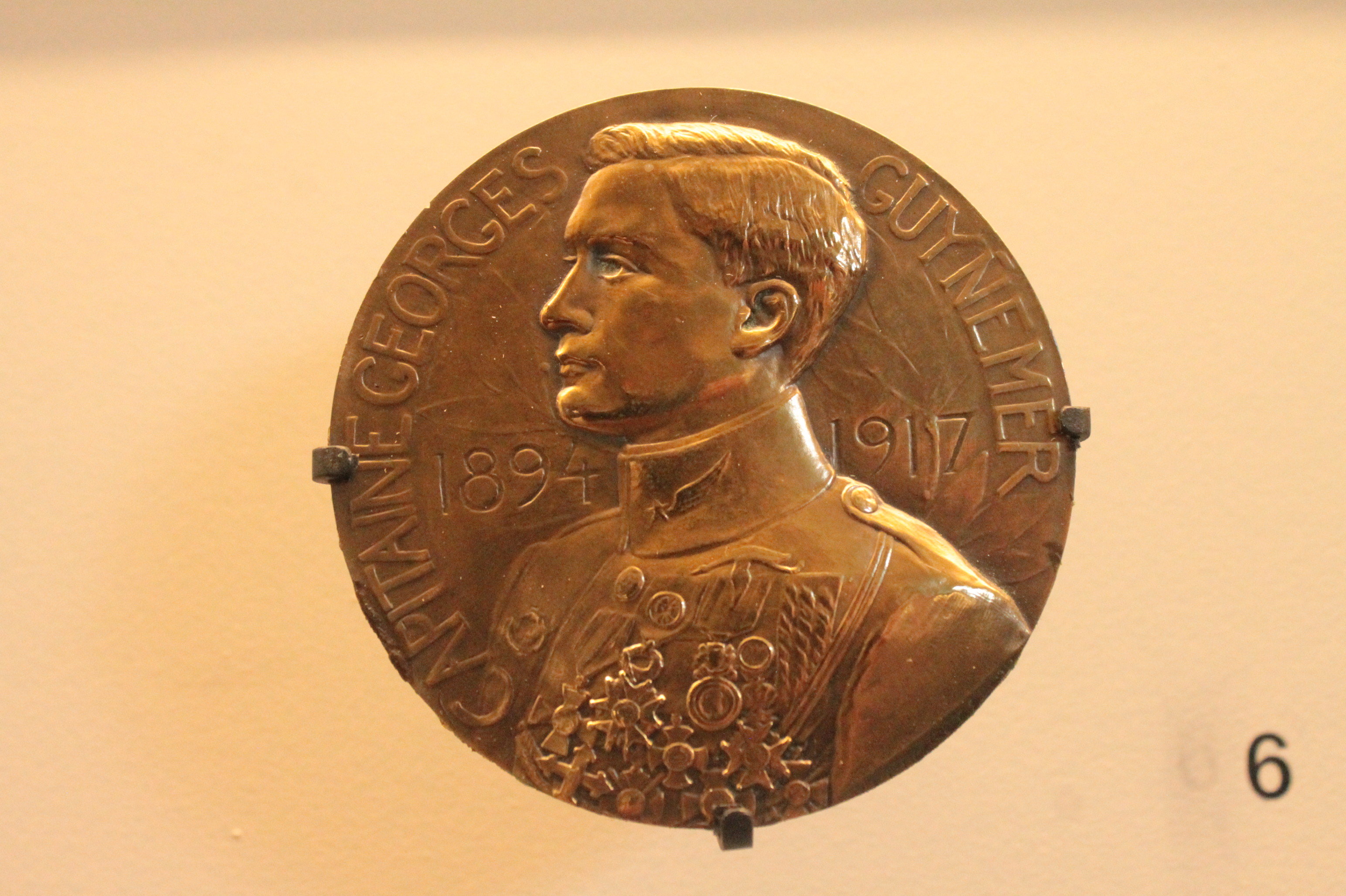
Commemorative medal to Georges Guynemer

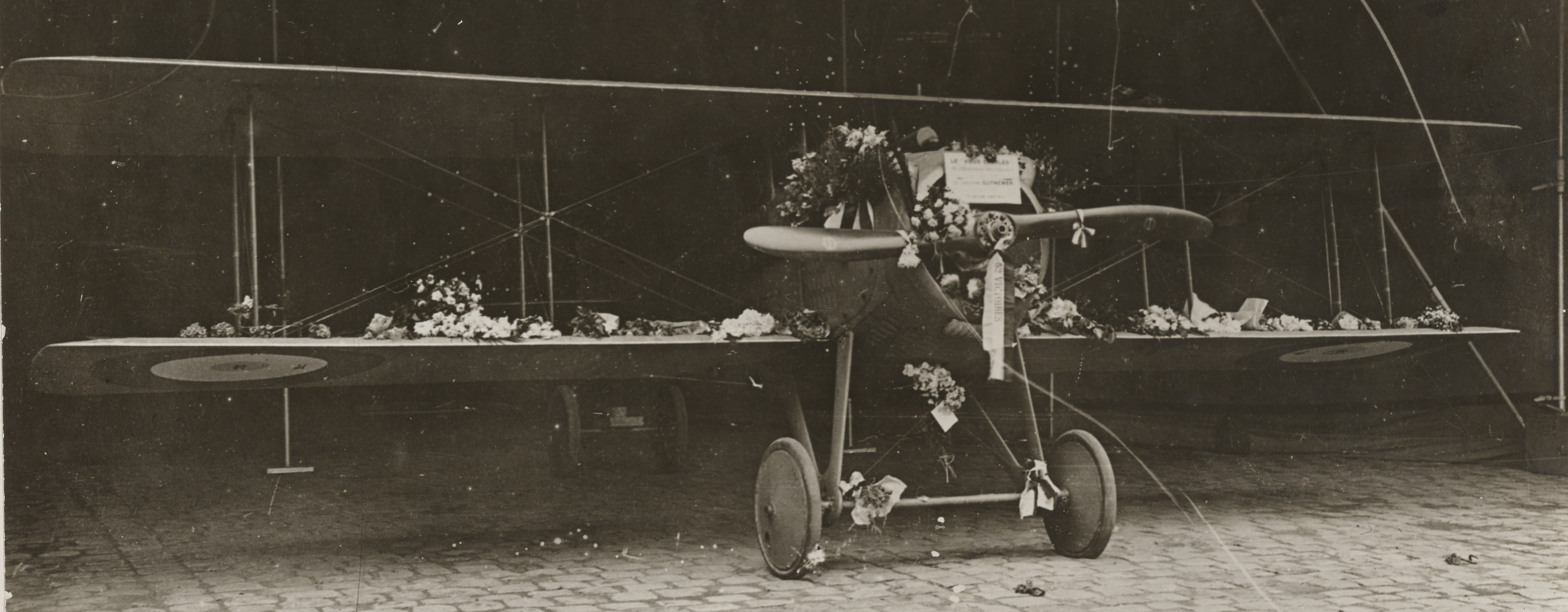
Guynemer's aircraft memorial

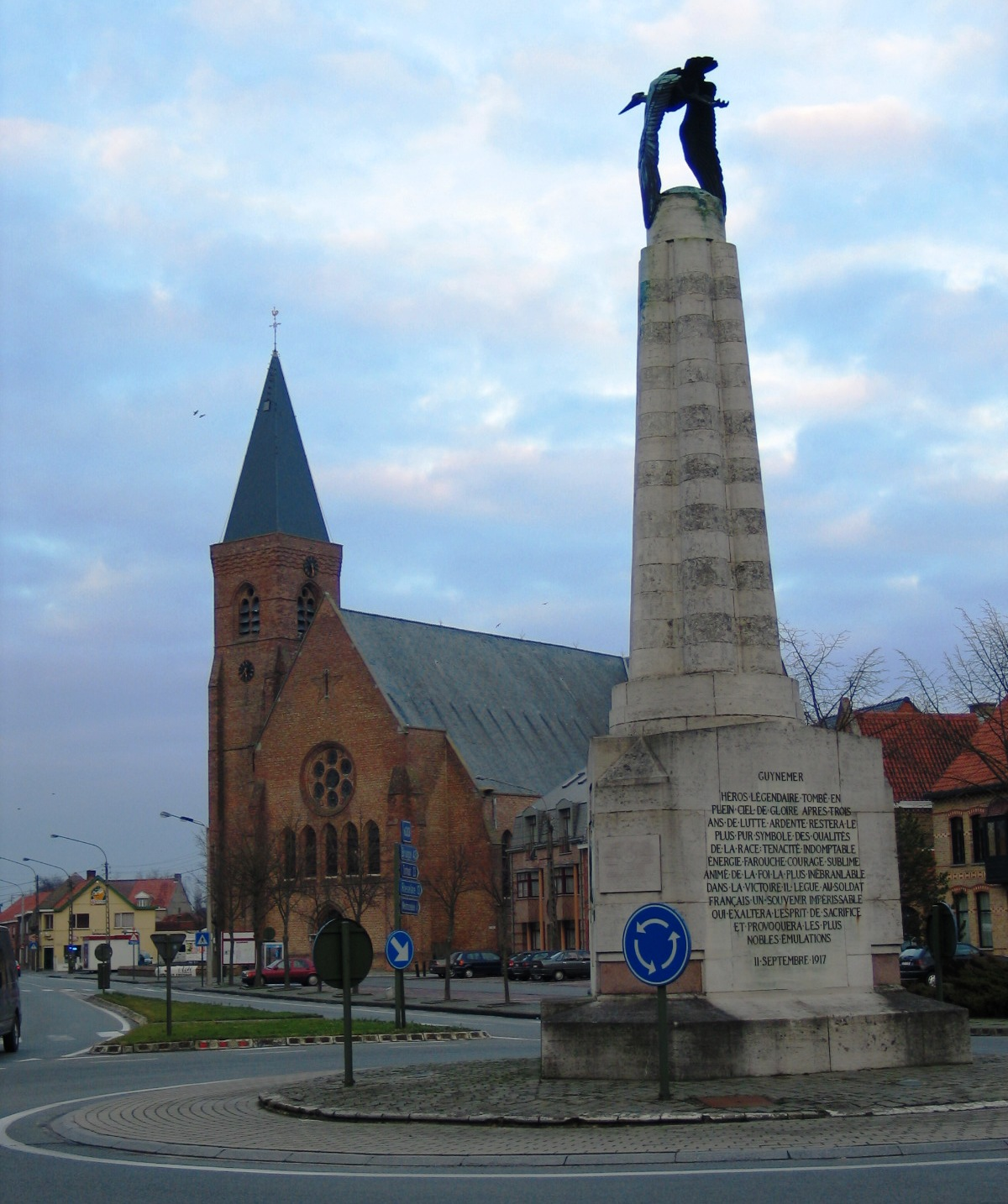
Statue in commemoration of Georges Guynemer in the heart of Poelkapelle

Guynemer failed to return from a combat mission on 11 September 1917. The previous week had been one of mechanical ills, in both his assigned aircraft and the ones he borrowed. At 08:30, with rookie pilot Jean Bozon-Verduraz, Guynemer took off in his Spad XIII S.504 n°2. His mission was to patrol the Langemark area. At 09:25, near Poelkapelle, Guynemer sighted a lone Rumpler, a German observation plane, and dove toward it. Bozon-Verduraz saw several Fokkers above him, and by the time he had shaken them off, his leader was nowhere in sight, so he returned alone. Guynemer never came back.

He was confirmed missing in action by his squadron commander, Major Brocard; this was officially announced in Paris by the French War Department on 25 September 1917. In the announcement, one of Guynemer's flying comrades (whose name was withheld due to security reasons) provided additional details of his final combat.

Guynemer sighted five machines of the Albatros type D-3. Without hesitation, he bore down on them. At that moment enemy patrolling machines, soaring at a great height, appeared suddenly and fell upon Guynemer. There were forty enemy machines in the air at this time, including Baron von Richthofen and his circus division of machines, painted in diagonal blue and white stripes. Toward Guynemer's right some Belgian machines hove in sight, but it was too late. Guynemer must have been hit. His machine dropped gently toward the Earth, and I lost track of it. All that I can say is that the machine was not on fire.

Further details were later added by Major Brocard, in an article in Paris Le Matin.

The last fight of the French aviator occurred four or five miles inside the German lines northeast of Ypres and opposite the British lines. Captain Guynemer was accompanied by Lieutenant Bozon Verduraz who says that they were flying at a height of 15,000 feet when Guynemer sighted an enemy two-seater which he attacked. Almost at the same moment Verduraz saw four German monoplanes approaching and turned toward them instantly so as to draw them off. They circled around for a while and then disappeared. Verduraz then returned to the place where he had left Guynemer engaged with the German biplane, but Guynemer had vanished.

Unofficial confirmation of Guynemer's death came from a captured German pilot who was shot down behind Canadian lines the evening of 29 September. The prisoner stated that a German NCO from the 413th Regiment (204th Division) had witnessed Guynemer's crash and identified his body. He also certified that Guynemer had died from a bullet through the head and had sustained other injuries including a broken leg and a finger shot away. The German party retrieving the body was driven away by Allied artillery fire before they could bury or remove the body. A US Red Cross communique (15 October) stated that the death of Guynemer was "definitely confirmed." This Red Cross report provided further details:

Information received by the Red Cross says Guynemer was shot through the head north of Poelcapelle on the Ypres front. His body was identified by a photograph on his pilot's license found in his pocket. The burial took place at Brussels in the presence of a guard of honor composed of the 5th Prussian Division. Such is the story told by a Belgian who has just escaped from the Germans. The burial was about to take place at Poelcapelle when the bombardment preceding the British attack at Ypres started. The burying party hastily withdrew taking the body with them. [A] German General [present was] an aviation enthusiast with a great admiration for Captain Guynemer's achievements. At his direction the body was taken to Brussels in a special funeral car... [Guynemer] was carried by non-commissioned officers and was covered with floral tributes from German aviators... Prussian Guards stood at salute upon ... [the car's] arrival and during the burial which was given all possible military honors. The French Government has been invited to place in the Pantheon, where many great Frenchmen are buried, an inscription to perpetuate the memory of Captain Guynemer as 'a symbol of the aspirations and enthusiasm of the Army.' A resolution to this effect has been introduced in the Chamber of Deputies by Deputy Lasies.

The two-seater Rumpler-type aircraft attacked by Guynemer, according to Bozon-Verduraz, has never been conclusively identified. Research published in 2005 suggests that it could have been a machine flown by Leutnant der Reserve Max Psaar (observer) and Fl. Georg Seibert (pilot) from FA(A)224.

Kurt Wissemann of Jasta 3 was officially credited with the downing of Guynemer. Wissemann would himself be killed in action little more than two weeks later on 28 September 1917.

Guynemer had officially been credited with 54 victories at the time of his death.

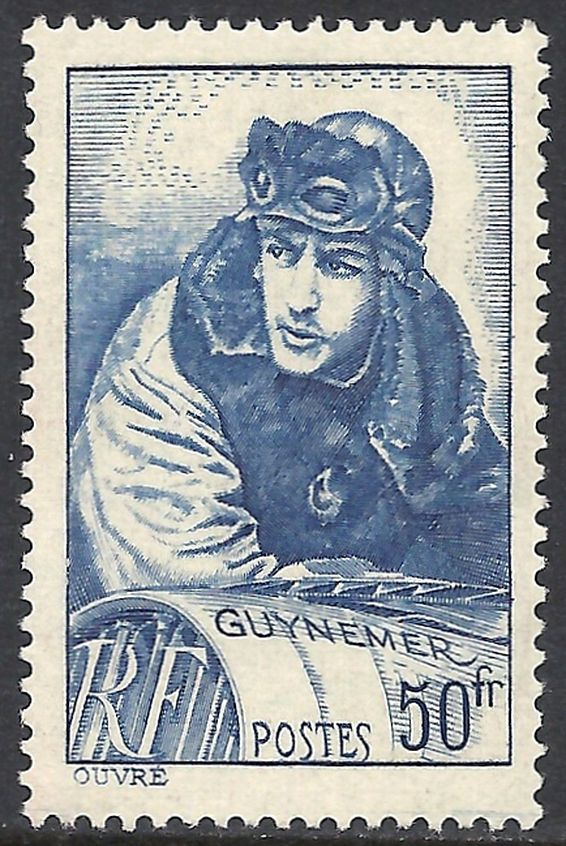
The French government issued a commemorative stamp in Georges Guynemer's honor in 1940. The stamp was protested by a group of German philatelists as Germany was about to occupy France, but the stamp was released to the public before anything would become of the objections.

== Legacy ==
Guynemer was lionized by the French press and became a national hero. The French government encouraged the publicity to boost morale and take the people's minds off the terrible losses in the trenches. Guynemer was embarrassed by the attention, but his shyness only increased the public's appetite to know everything about him. This was quite different later in 1918 with the French top ace René Fonck, who despite having 75 confirmed victories, had bad publicity for his arrogance and shameless self-promotion. Guynemer's death was a profound shock to France; nevertheless, he remained an icon for the duration of the war. Only 22 at his death, he continued to inspire the nation with his advice, "Until one has given all, one has given nothing."

The Paris street rue Guynemer is named after him, as is a school in Compiègne, the Institution Guynemer. A statue was erected in Poelcapelle in commemoration of Georges Guynemer.

The episode "The Last Flight" (1960) from season one of the American television series The Twilight Zone was loosely based on the disappearance of Guynemer put to fictional speculation as to what happened to him.

He received many decorations, including the Order of Karađorđe Star with swords from Serbia.

== Honors and awards ==
- Officer of the Order of Legion of Honour
- Médaille Militaire
- Croix de guerre 1914-1918

== See also ==
- French Air Force
- List of people who disappeared
- List of World War I flying aces
- When the World was Wide

== Ancestry ==
Ancestors of Georges Guynemer

8. Bernard Pascal Guynemer
4. Auguste Saint-Ange Guynemer
2. Paul Guynemer
5. Louise Antoinette Desiree Lyon
1. Georges Guynemer
6. René de Saint-Quentin, Count of Saint-Quentin
3. Julie, Countess of Saint-Quentin
14. Jean Alfred Rene Rodolphe Doynel de Quincy
7. Virginie Henriette Isabel Doynel de Quincey
15. Julie Marie Albertine Gros

== See also ==
- Arthur Constantin Krebs, father of Jean Krebs, the college friend of Georges Guynemer

Preceded by Eugène Gilbert	Top Flying Ace; France, World War I	Succeeded by Jean Navarre
