= When the World was Wide =

1978 American documentary

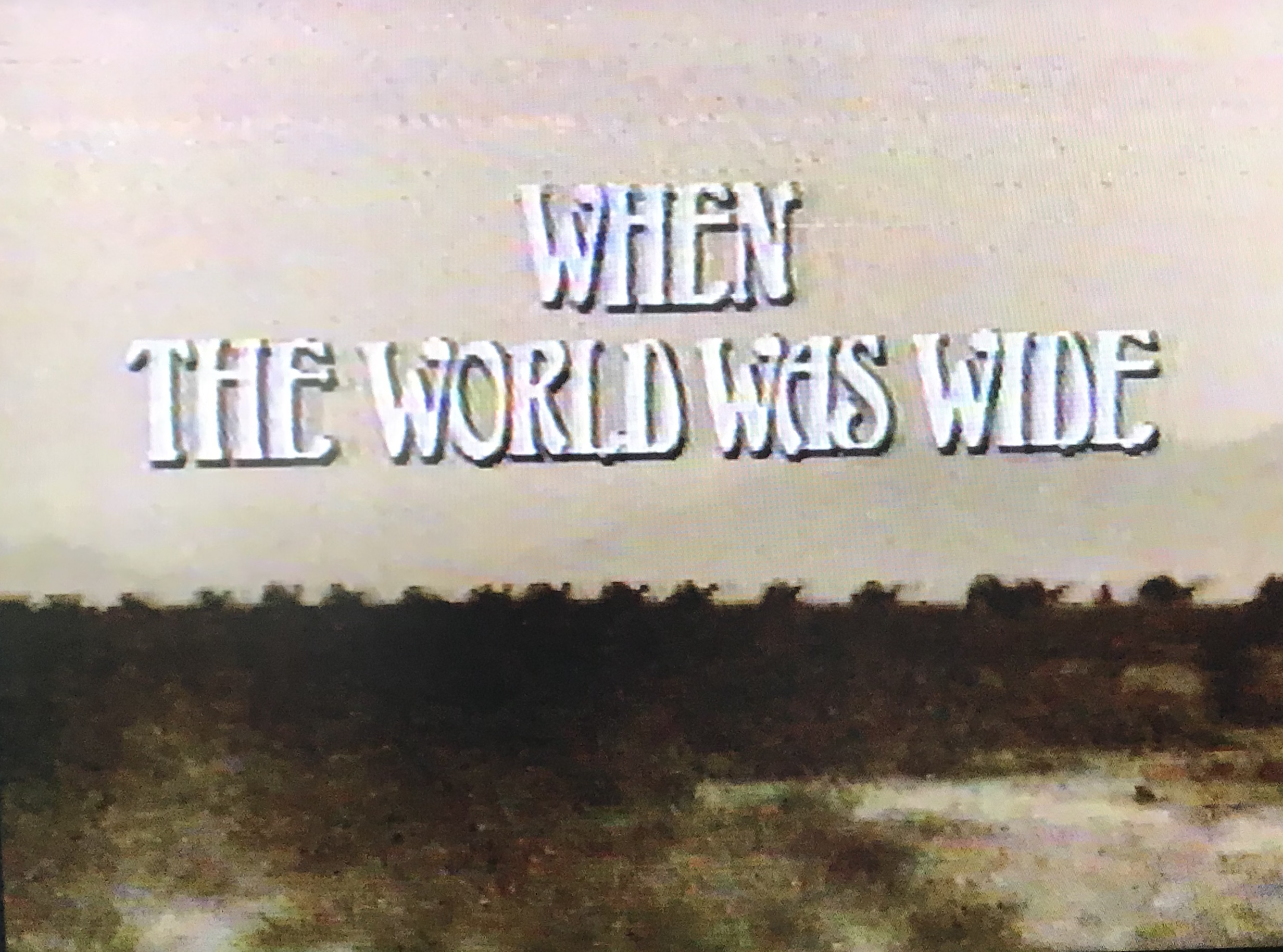
- Title card
- Directed by: Perry Miller Adato
- Written by: Dorothy Monet
- Produced by: Perry Miller Adato
- Music by: Rosemary Fishel (music supervisor)
- Distributed by: WNET/13; Educational Broadcasting Corporation
- Release date: 1978
- Running time: 58 min, 10 sec
- Language: English

When the World was Wide is a 1978 American documentary film that presents pioneering travelogue footage of exotic and far-flung locales taken between 1905 and 1927. It samples archival footage reaching back to "the last days of the Manchu Dynasty" in China and includes the first footage taken in Japan (1909) and Tibet (1919) and the first ever of a Dalai Lama.

== Background ==
The film is narrated by the actor Lee Richardson and draws upon material in the Albert Kahn Archives in France. It was adapted from material in an earlier French film series, Donner à voir (1966).

== Content ==
Opening title card: "An homage to the anonymous pioneer cameraman who filmed these images recently unearthed in a French archive."

Brief sequences are presented in roughly chronological order:

- China (1905), including Peking (1906), featuring the Imperial palace and guards during the last days of the Empress Dowager Cixi.
- Cambodia (1910), including Angkor Wat and sacred Cambodian dance.
- Siam (1910), featuring the coronation of Prince Vajiravudh as King Rama VI of Thailand.
- Japan (1909) with the traditional tea ceremony (first film footage in Japan).
- India (1910), sacred bathing and cremations at Allahabad at the confluence of the Ganges and Jumna Rivers.
- Persia (1909), scenes of the 10th day of the holy month of Muharram in Tehran, including the processional performance of blood-letting in honor of the martyrdom of Husayn ibn Ali.
- Mesopotamia (1912), including Baghdad.
- Constantinople (1909).
- Palestine (1910), including the "Wailing Wall" (Western Wall) in Jerusalem.
- Macedonia (1913)
- Austria (1914)
- London (1916), including the Tower Bridge and Piccadilly Circus.
- Paris (1917), including the 23-year old aviator, and French national hero, Captain Georges Guynemer, some months before his tragic death.
- Nice (1913), featuring its famous Carnival.
- The Cameroons (1920) and baby gorillas.
- India (1920), featuring the Maharaja of Kapurthala and the newly installed British Viceroy Lord Chelmsford.
- Afghanistan (1921), including Kabul and a British expedition seen surveying the India/Afghan border.
- Tibet (1919), including Lhasa and a contingent of German anthropologists, whirling dervishes, prostrating Buddhist pilgrims, a traditional archery tournament and the 13th Dalai Lama filmed at an audience at the Potala Palace (the first cameras ever allowed in).
- Palestine (1925), where Lord Balfour tours one of the earliest kibbutzim.
- China (1927), where insurgents are seen rioting at the instigation of the Chinese Civil War.

== Distribution ==
When the World was Wide was broadcast on Public Broadcasting Service stations nationwide in the spring of 1983. It has never been made commercially available on VHS tape or in DVD form.
