= Georg Weiner =

German flying ace (1895–1957)

- Born: 22 August 1895
- Died: 24 January 1957 (aged 61)
- Military career
- Allegiance: Germany
- Branch: Aviation
- Rank: Leutnant
- Units: Schutzstaffel 15, Jagdstaffel 20, Kest 3, Jagdstaffel 3
- Other work: Generalmajor in World War II

General Major Georg Weiner was a German flying ace during World War I, being credited with nine aerial victories. He would continue in Germany's military service, rising to the rank of Generalmajor during World War II.

== Early life ==
Georg Weiner was born in Dresden, Germany, on 22 August 1895. He joined the German Army early in World War I, on 22 August 1914.

== World War I ==
=== Promotions and appointments ===
22 November 1914: Enlisted as a Gefreiter

14 January 1915: Promoted to Unteroffizier and Fahnenjunker

16 April 1915: Appointed as Fahnrich

25 June 1915: Commissioned as Leutnant

=== Duty assignments ===
22 November 1914: Began service in the ranks of the 103rd Infantry Regiment

1 January 1915: Promoted to lead an infantry platoon and company

2 August 1915: Assigned to staff duty as an Ordnance Officer with 244th Reserve Infantry Regiment

20 March 1916: Detached for pilot training with 5th Flying Replacement Battalion and at the Military Flying School at Halberstadt

2 September 1916: Assigned to pilot's duty with Jagdstaffel 38

4 November 1916: Advanced training with 7th Flying Replacement Battalion, Cologne

21 November 1916: Assigned to Jagdstaffel 20 as a pilot

24 June 1917: Hospitalized with wound in the Naval Hospital in Bruges

15 July 1917: Posted to training and inspection duties

17 August 1917: Transferred to pilot's duty with Kest 3

5 September 1918: Appointed as Staffelführer to command Jagdstaffel 3

== List of aerial victories ==
See also Aerial victory standards of World War I

No.	Date/time	Aircraft	Foe	Result	Location	Notes
1	23 March 1917		Nieuport	Destroyed	Vendeuil	
2	6 March 1918		Spad VII	Destroyed	Château-Salins	Victim was the US Caporal Tommy Hitchcock Junior from Escadrille 87 WIA and POW
3	18 May 1918 @ 0940 hours		Spad	Destroyed	Southwest of Armaucourt	Victim was from Escadrille 90
4	1 June 1918 @ 0650 hours		Airco DH.4 serial number A7482	Destroyed	Antilly(Moselle)	Victim was from No. 55 Squadron RAF. 2nd Lt. Lennock de Graaf Godet and 2nd Lt. Arthur Haley KIA
5	7 September 1918	Fokker D.VII	Airco DH.9	Destroyed	Dasburg	Victim was from the RAF's Independent Air Force
6	7 September 1918	Fokker D.VII	Airco DH.9	Destroyed	Burscheid	Victim was from the Independent Air Force
7	16 September 1918 @ 1330 hours	Fokker D.VII	Airco DH.9 s/n F5712	Destroyed	Alteckendorf	Victim was from No. 55 Squadron RAF. The pilot, W. E. Johns, survived and became a famous author post–war. The gunner, Second Lieutenant Alfred Edward Amey died of his wounds
8	17 September 1918	Fokker D.VII	Breguet 14	Destroyed	Falkenberg	
9	5 October 1918	Fokker D.VII	Airco DH.9a	Destroyed	Heimbach	Victim was from No. 110 Squadron RAF

== Between the World Wars ==
=== Promotions and appointments ===
1 April 1925: Promoted to oberleutnant

1 February 1930: Promoted to hauptmann

1 April 1935: Promoted to major

1 March 1937: Promoted to oberstleutnant

1 June 1939: Promoted to oberst

=== Duty assignments ===
29 November 1918: Demobilization duties with 6th Flying Replacement Battalion, Jagdstaffel 5

1 June 1919: Pilot with Saxony's Artillery Flying Squadron Großenhain

1 October 1919: Seconded to Airbase Großenhain

8 May 1920: Assigned to ground duty as technical officer with Light Motor Vehicle Column 4

1 October 1920: Platoon leader with Motor Transport Battalions

1 April 1925: Began weapon technology studies at the Technical Studies College Dresden, which led to his Diploma in Engineering, awarded 21 March 1932

1 April 1932: Assigned as advisor in the Army Weapons Office

1 April 1933: Posted to staff duty with various motor transport battalions

1 April 1935: Transferred into the Luftwaffe as Battery Chief of the Flak Bataillon Lubeck

15 March 1936: Director of the Luftwaffe's Test Site in Rechlin

1 December 1936: Staff duty with Fighter Group I/137 at Bernburg

1 March 1937: Appointed to command Fighter Group I/137

== World War II ==
=== Promotions and appointments ===
1 October 1943: Promoted to Generalmajor

=== Duty assignments ===
1 June 1939: Assigned to command the 71st Flying Training Regiment

27 May 1940: Tasked as Airport Area Commandant, Jessau/Insterburg

1941: Served as Air Region Column Leader for the Netherlands

1942: Served as Air Region Column Leader for Italy and North Africa

1 July 1943: Assigned as Director of the travel staff with the Luftwaffe personnel office

1 April 1944: Transferred to reserves of the OKL

1 July 1944: Assigned to special duties with Air Region Command VI

28 February 1945: Retired from military service

== Post World War II ==
Generalmajor Georg Weiner was detained by the victorious Russians in the aftermath of the War, and imprisoned in the Soviet Union on 5 October 1945. He was not released until 26 September 1949.

He died on 24 January 1957 in Göttingen, Germany.

== Honors and awards ==
1914 Iron Cross first and second class

Pilot's Badge

Ritterkreuz second class Albrechts Order with Swords

Ritterkreuz service medal second class with swords

Black Wound Badge

Aviator's Commemorative Badge

Honor Cross for Combatants

Wehrmacht Long Service Award fourth to the first class

Africa Cuff Title
