= Lozenge camouflage =

Military camouflage scheme

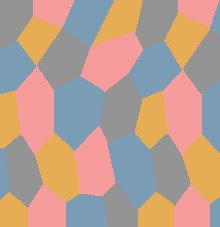
A light-toned four-color, or Vierfarbiger lozenge camouflage pattern typical of daytime operations for underside use

A hexagon-based lozenge camouflage typical of night operations

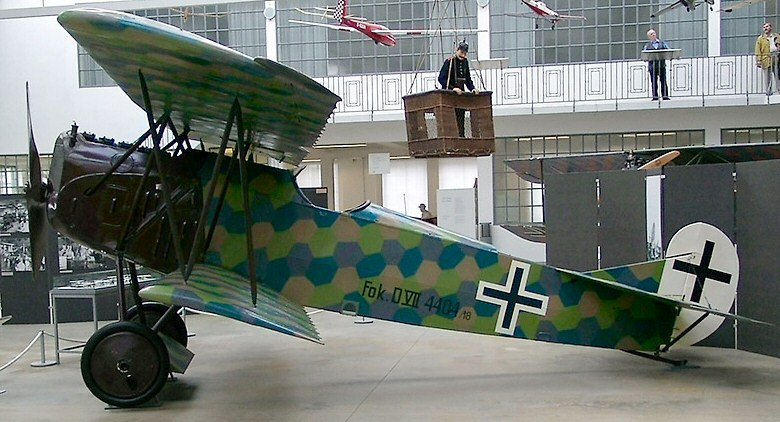
A Fokker D.VII shows a four-color Lozenge-Tarnung (lozenge camouflage), and its early Balkenkreuz black "core cross" on the fuselage has a white outline completely surrounding it.

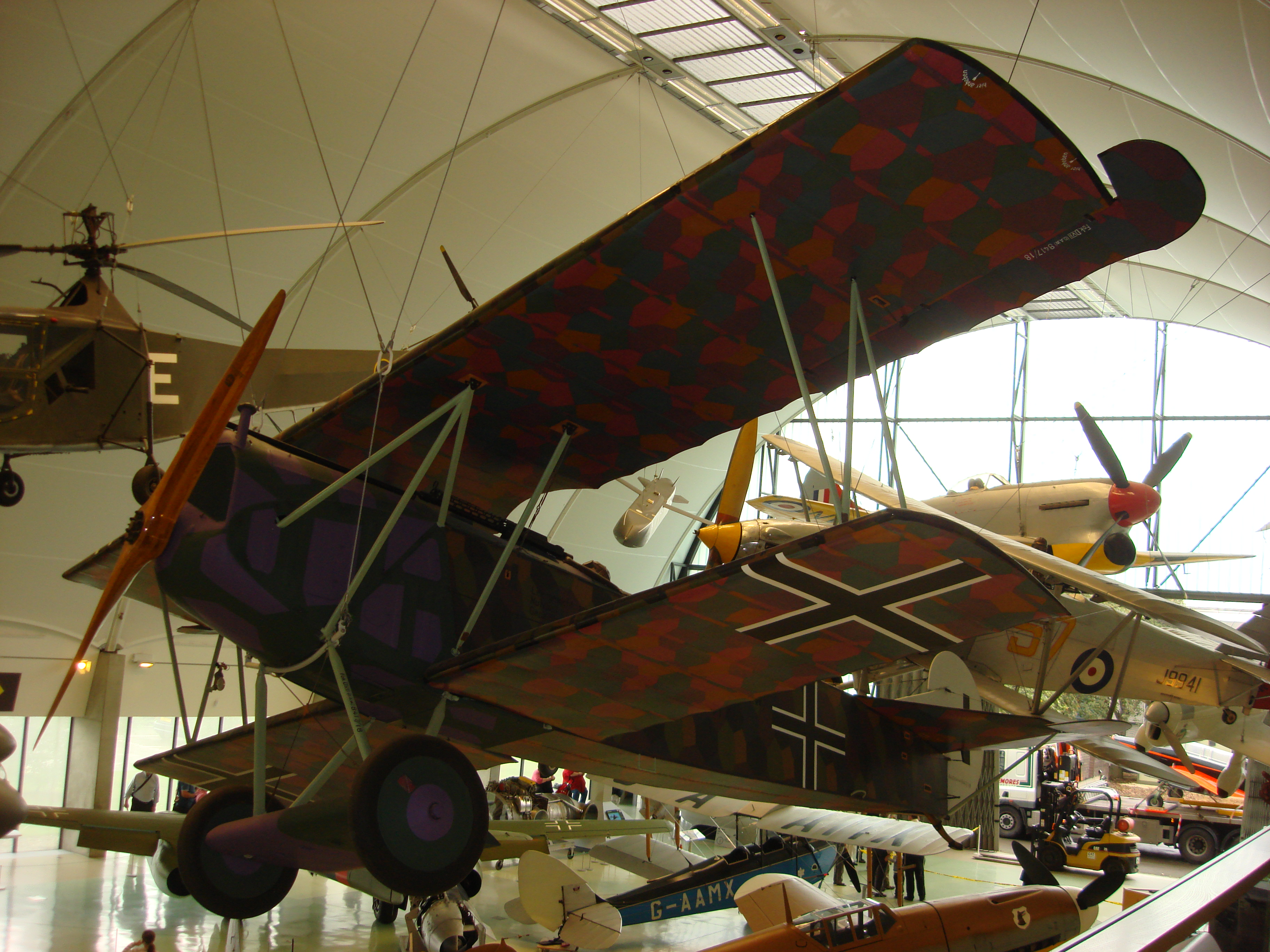
Another Fokker D.VII with a typical five-color pattern

Lozenge camouflage was a military camouflage scheme in the form of patterned cloth or painted designs used by some aircraft of the Central Powers in the last two years of World War I, primarily those of the Imperial German Luftstreitkräfte. It takes its name from the repeated polygon shapes incorporated in the designs, many of which resembled lozenges. In Germany it was called Buntfarbenaufdruck (multi-colored print) but this designation includes other camouflage designs such as Splittermuster and Leibermuster, and does not include hand-painted camouflage.

== Development ==
During the early stages of the Great War, the Germans were looking for a way to effectively camouflage the aircraft of the Luftstreitkräfte to inhibit enemy observation of the aircraft while it was airborne and when on the ground. Large, irregular blotches with two or three colors were used on the upper surfaces of the wing which led to the development of the Buntfarbenanstrich, the lozenge camouflage made up of repeating patterns of irregularly shaped four-, five- or six-sided polygons. Because painting such a pattern was very time-consuming, and the paint added considerably to the weight of the aircraft, the patterns were printed on fabric, and the fabric was then used to cover the aircraft. This printed fabric was used in various forms and colors from late 1916 until the end of the war.

== Use ==
Lozenge camouflage appeared primarily on German aircraft along the Western Front but some air units of the Austro-Hungarian Imperial and Royal Aviation Troops used the pattern on the Eastern Front and on the Italian Front.

National markings such as the Balkenkreuz made camouflage less effective.

Lozenge camouflage came in varying widths, sometimes in 4.5-foot-wide (1.4 m) bolts of fabric, and pieces were cut to fit between the leading and trailing edges of the wing. Fabric sections laid chordwise were lined up next to each other so that the pattern repeated itself regularly across the wing, except for the ailerons which were covered in fabric laid sparwise, perpendicular to the wing pattern. Some aircraft had the fabric applied diagonally. As a part of field repairs, regularly laid fabric patterns from the factory might be overlaid with the same pattern but at a different angle, or with fabric from a different camouflage design. Later in the war, some patterns were applied more quickly with fabric laid sparwise along the full wingspan. Hasty factory work began to resemble the rushed field repairs.

Darker lozenge patterns were used for upper wing surfaces, while lighter ones were used for the undersides of the aircraft. Even darker shades were used for night operations by aircraft such as Zeppelin-Staaken R.VI and Gotha G.V heavy bombers. These aircraft were often hand-painted in similar but unrepeating patterns on their fuselages. The heaviest Riesenflugzeug were painted in lozenge patterns—they were never covered in printed fabric.

=== The Luftstreitkräfte's use of printed-lozenge on fighters ===
The two most common types of pre-printed lozenge fabric used on day fighter aircraft were differentiated by the number of colors used in the pattern, and their similar patterns of polygonal shapes that defined them. The less common Vierfarbiger, or four-color lozenge pattern of 1.30 meter bolt width, and the more common Fünffarbiger, or five-color pattern of 1.345 meter bolt width, also had lighter color lower surface and darker color upper surface variations available for use. Two patterns have been named by historians from the surviving World War I-era German fighter aircraft that have had relatively intact examples of these lozenge coverings on them, each as the "type aircraft" that inspired the modern names for both the four and five color lozenge camouflage designs: the four-color fabric is called Knowlton from the intact Fokker D.VII on display with serial number D.VII(Alb) 6810/18 (built under license by Albatros Flugzeugwerke for the Fokker firm) in a museum located in the Knowlton suburb of Lac-Brome, Quebec; and the more often used five-color fabric is called Canberra, from the similarly intact Albatros D.Va fighter (serial number D.5390/17) at Canberra's Australian War Memorial.

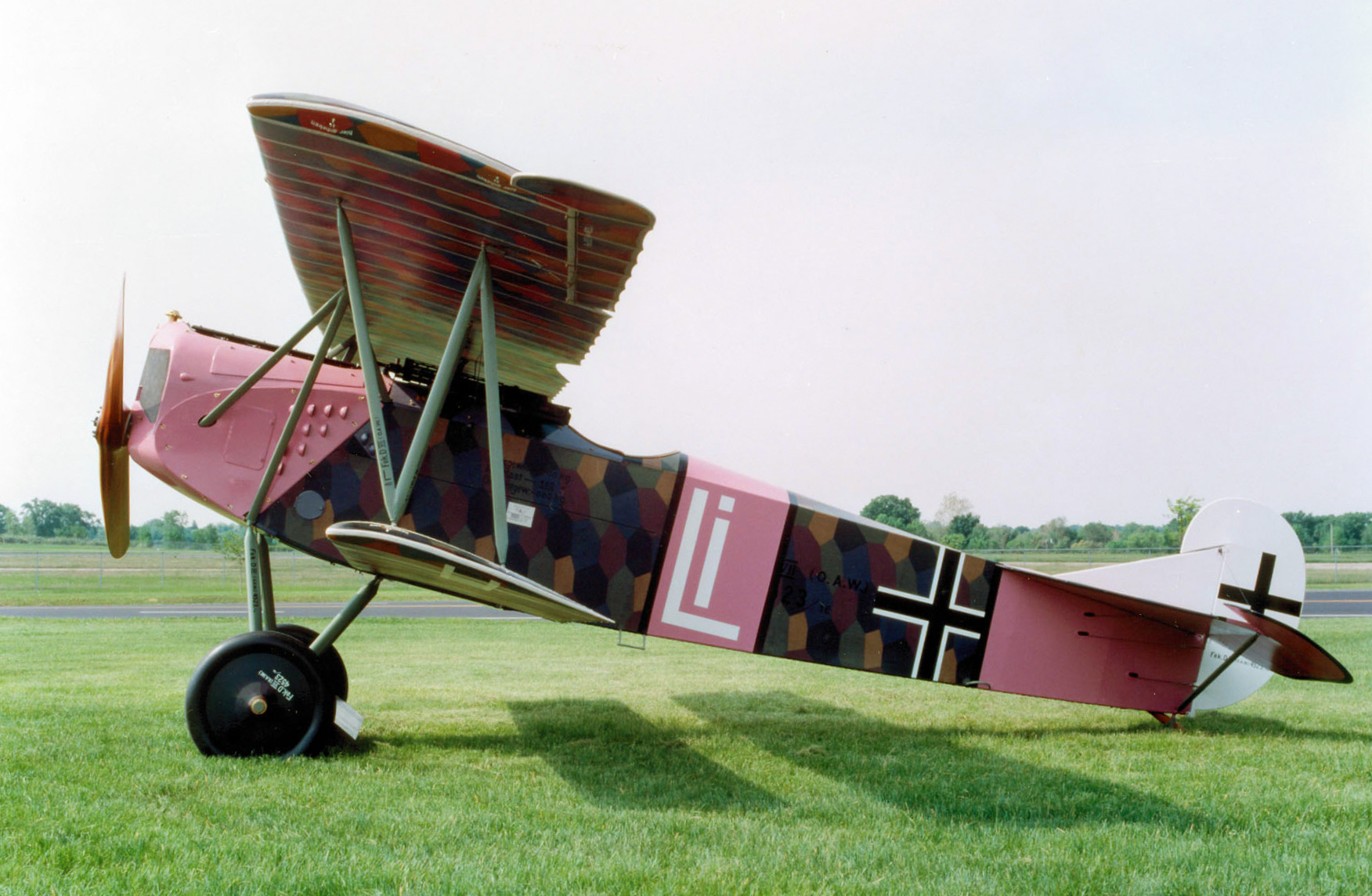
A five-color lozenge camouflage alternates with the pilot's personal color choice of pink on the fuselage of this Fokker D.VII reproduction. Its wing is covered in lozenge fabric.

As with all camouflage, the need to hide or obscure the aircraft from the enemy was counterbalanced by the need to have friendly forces recognize the aircraft. Bold black and white Iron Cross or Balkenkreuz markings provided a way to quickly identify the aircraft and at the same time, such national markings' high contrast elements detracted from the effect of the camouflage. Further, individual pilots often added their own personal coloration to aircraft that they flew regularly. An individual might paint the nose and tail in bright, unique colors to distinguish him in the air from his squadron mates. All of these practices rendered the lozenge camouflage less effective.

Flying aces such as Georg von Hantelmann painted their fighters with two goals: to display unit colors, and to show personal flair. Factory-applied lozenge camouflage was not seen as important. Hantelmann's Albatros D.V was decorated with a prominent death's head in white against the dark blue fuselage and red nose which indicated his unit, Jasta 15. Only the wings and rudder of his Albatros were laid with lozenge camouflage. Similarly, Ernst Udet, the second-highest scoring German ace of World War I, painted his Fokker D.VII bright red with bold white stripes and large white lettering on the rudder reading "Du doch nicht!!" (Lit: "Definitely not you!", Figuratively: "You may not!", or: "No you don't!") His aircraft ineffectively retained its lozenge camouflage on the upper surface of the lower wing.

== See also ==
- Aircraft livery
- Dazzle camouflage
- List of camouflage patterns
