= Kurt Wissemann =

German flying ace

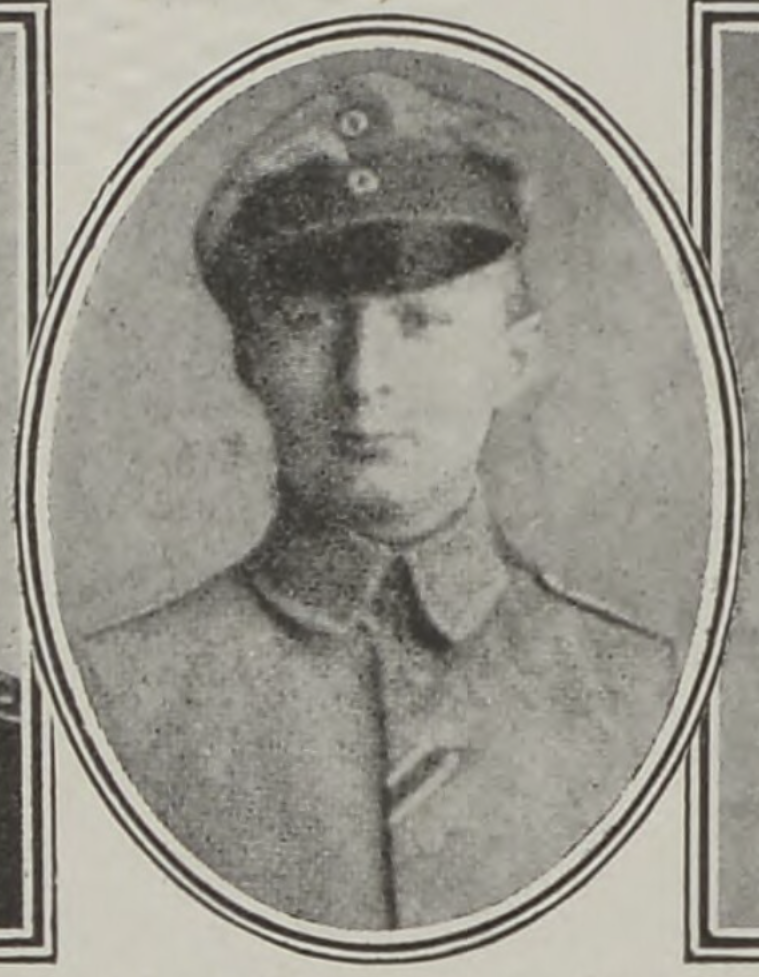
- Wissemann in 1916
- Born: 20 March 1893; Elberfeld, Germany
- Died: 28 September 1917 (aged 24); Westrozebeke, Belgium
- Military career
- Allegiance: Germany
- Branch: Aviation
- Rank: Leutnant
- Unit: Jasta 3
- Awards: Iron Cross

Kurt Wissemann was a German World War I flying ace credited with five aerial victories.

== Biography ==
Born in Elberfeld, Wissemann trained as a Leutnant with Jastaschule 1 (Fighter school 1) before being posted to Jasta 3 on 28 May 1917. He claimed 5 victories during 1917, one of which was reputed to be top French ace Capitaine Georges Guynemer on 11 September. He was killed in action over Westrozebeke, allegedly versus Rene Fonck but documentary evidence suggests it was more probably either Captain Reginald Hoidge or Captain Geoffrey Hilton Bowman of No. 56 Squadron, Royal Flying Corps.
