= Perry Miller Adato =

American documentary film producer, director and writer

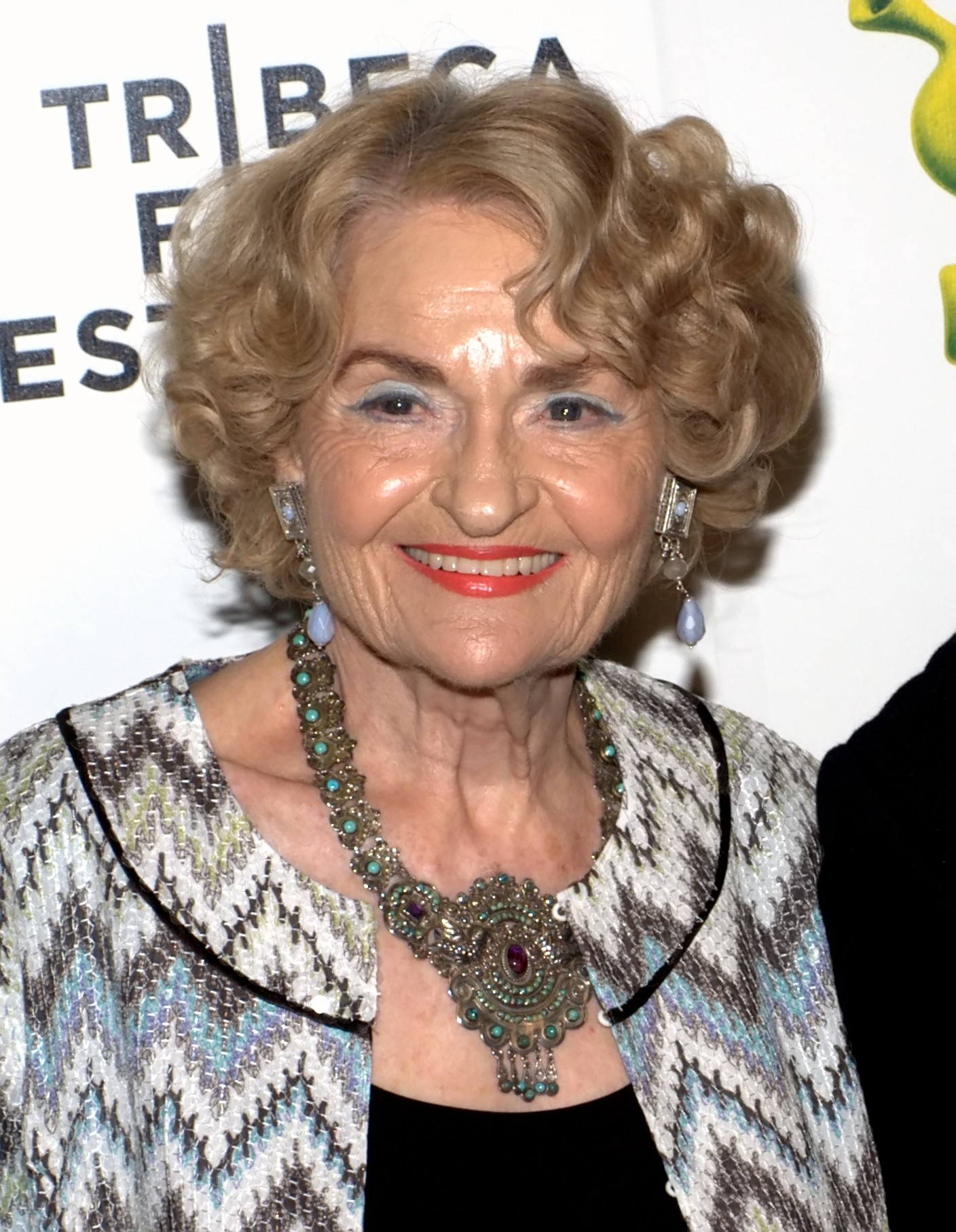
- Adato at the 2010 Tribeca Film Festival
- Born: Lillian Perry Miller; December 22, 1920; Yonkers, New York, U.S.
- Died: September 16, 2018 (aged 97); Westport, Connecticut, U.S.
- Occupation: documentary filmmaker

Perry Miller Adato (December 22, 1920 – September 16, 2018) was an American documentary film producer and director and writer. Adato was born Lillian Perry Miller in Yonkers, New York. At age 18 she moved to Greenwich Village. She married Neil M. Adato on September 11, 1955. They had two children, Lauren and Michelle.

== Early life ==
From a very young age Perry Miller Adato was interested in performing. She would perform for her mother, brother and sister in a small Yonkers apartment that her late father left for them. Her widowed mother Ida (Block) Miller managed apartment buildings to provide for her family. During her high school career Perry acted and continued to pursue her acting career during World War II.

== Career ==
At the end of World War II Adato worked at the United Nations as a film consultant hoping to use film as a catalyst for social change. After working at the United Nations Miller moved to Paris in the 1950s and began to develop her documentary skills. While in Paris she also created the Film Advisory Center to bring European documentaries to the United States. In 1953 Perry left the advisory center behind to work at CBS as a film researcher.

== Awards ==
Miller won an Emmy in 1968 for her first film, Dylan Thomas: The World I Breathe and won two Emmy nominations for Gertrude Stein: When This You See, Remember Me in 1970. In 1980 she won an Emmy nomination for Picasso-A Painter's Diary. She was also the first woman to win the coveted Directors Guild of America Award for Georgia O'Keeffe, and garnered four DGA awards over the course of her career.

== Activism ==
In 1943 Perry and her friends founded a social activist group called Stage For Action. The inspiration for this group stemmed from the anxieties many faced during World War II. Including the recent attack on Pearl Harbor. The group's main focus was creating art that was politically motivated, and to make citizens at home aware of how they could help the soldiers on the war front.

While Miller did not call herself a feminist film maker she did take into account that her being a woman had some influence on the movies that she created. Miller often made documentaries where women were the main focus. Including Mary Cassatt, Georgia O'Keeffe, and Betye Saar as part of a series focusing on Women In Art on WNET. Miller also expressed in the 1970s that she wished she had not been so "Behind the Scenes". Miller also believed that the movement for women's rights was responsible for opening the doors to women in film.

== Filmography ==
- Paris The Luminous Years – Toward the Making of the Modern (2010)
- Georgia O'Keeffe – A Life in Art (2003)
- Alfred Stieglitz: The Eloquent Eye (2001)
- Great Tales in Asian Art (1996)
- Art of the Western World (series 1989–90)
- A White Garment of Churches (1989)
- Eugene O'Neill: A Glory of Ghosts (1986)
- Carl Sandburg: Echoes and Silences (1982)
- Picasso – A Painter's Diary (1980)
- Frankenthaler – Toward A New Climate (1978)
- When the World was Wide (1978)
- Georgia O'Keeffe (1977)
- Mary Cassatt – Impressionist From Philadelphia (1975)
- The Originals – Women in Art (series 1975–78)
- An Eames Celebration – Several Worlds Of Charles Eames and Ray Eames (1973)
- The Great Radio Comedians (1972)
- Gertrude Stein: When This You See, Remember Me (1970)
- The Film Generation And Dance (1969)
- The Film Generation (series 1968–69)
- Dylan Thomas – The World I Breathe (1968)
