= Jagdstaffel 3 =

Jasta 3
- Active: 1916–1918
- Country: German Empire
- Branch: Luftstreitkräfte
- Type: Fighter squadron
- Engagements: World War I

Royal Prussian Jagdstaffel 3 was a fighter squadron of the Luftstreitkräfte, the air arm of the Imperial German Army during World War I. It was founded on 10 August 1916 at Flieger Ersatz Abteilung 5 in Braunschweig, Germany, as one of the first wave of squadrons that formed the Luftstreitkräfte. It served until the Armistice on 11 November 1918. It was credited with a minimum of 83 victories, at the cost of 16 pilots killed in action, 4 killed in accidents, 1 taken prisoner of war, and two wounded.

== History ==
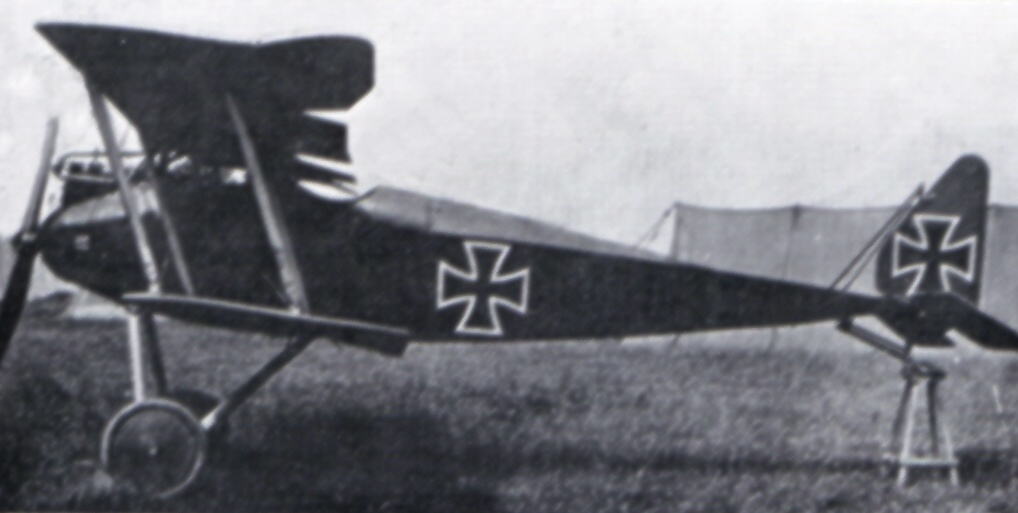
Jasta 3 was originally assigned Halberstadt DIIs.

Only three weeks after its founding, Jasta 3 moved to support 2 Armee when it transferred to Vraignes, near Peronne. When it transferred to Guesnain near Douai, it changed to control of the 6th Armee Front. Its move to Rumbeke heralded its incorporation into Jagdgruppe 15 along with Jasta 8, Jasta 26, and Jasta 27. JG 15 was assigned to command of Hauptmann Constantin von Bentheim, and flew support for 4 Armee. After that, on 5 February 1918, Jasta 3 was reassigned to Jagdgruppe 9 along with Jasta 28 and Jasta 37 (which lineup would change from time to time). Khoze would command both the squadron and the wing. By July 1918, Jasta 3 would be working out of Blaise for 3rd Armee Front. Its final assignment was support of the 19 Armee.

== Commanding officers (Staffelführer) ==
- Leutnant Ewald von Mellinthin: 10 August 1916 – 12 September 1916 (KIA)
- Leutnant Alfred Mohr: 12 September 1916 – 1 April 1917 (KIA)
- Oberleutnant Herman Kohze: 1 April 1917 – 4 September 1918
- Leutnant Georg Weiner: 5 September 1918 – 11 November 1918

== Duty stations (airfields) ==
- Braunschweig, Germany: 10 August 1916 – 1 September 1916
- Vraignes, France: 1 September 1916 – 4 November 1916
- Fontaine-Uterte, France: 5 November 1916 – 20 March 1917
- Guesnain, France: 21 March 1917 – 11 July 1917
- Houplin, France: 12 July 1917 – 19 July 1917
- Rumbeke, Belgium: 20 July 1917 – 16 September 1917
- Guise, France: 17 September 1917 – 19 September 1917
- Rumbeke, Belgium: 20 September 1917 – 16 October 1917
- Wynghene, Belgium: 17 October 1917 – 12 March 1918
- Briastre, France: 13 March 1918 – 23 March 1918
- Mons-en-Chaussée, France: 24 March 1918 – 10 April 1918
- Ingelmünster, Belgium: 11 April 1918 – 3 May 1918
- Rumbeke, Belgium: 4 May 1918 – 5 June 1918
- Falvy, France: 6 June 1918 – 8 July 1918
- Blaise, France: 9 July 1918 – 7 September 1918
- Gross-Tanchen, Mörchingen, Germany: 8 September 1918 – 11 November 1918

== Personnel ==
Among the aces who served in the squadron, the following are notable:

- Carl Menckhoff
- Julius Schmidt
- Georg Schlenker
- Kurt Wissemann
- Georg Weiner

== Aircraft and operations ==
Halberstadt D.IIIs were noted as being the aircraft on hand when the unit was founded. It has also been noted as using Albatros D.IIIs and Albatros D.Vs.
