= House Order of Hohenzollern =

Dynastic order

House Order of Hohenzollern Hausorden von Hohenzollern
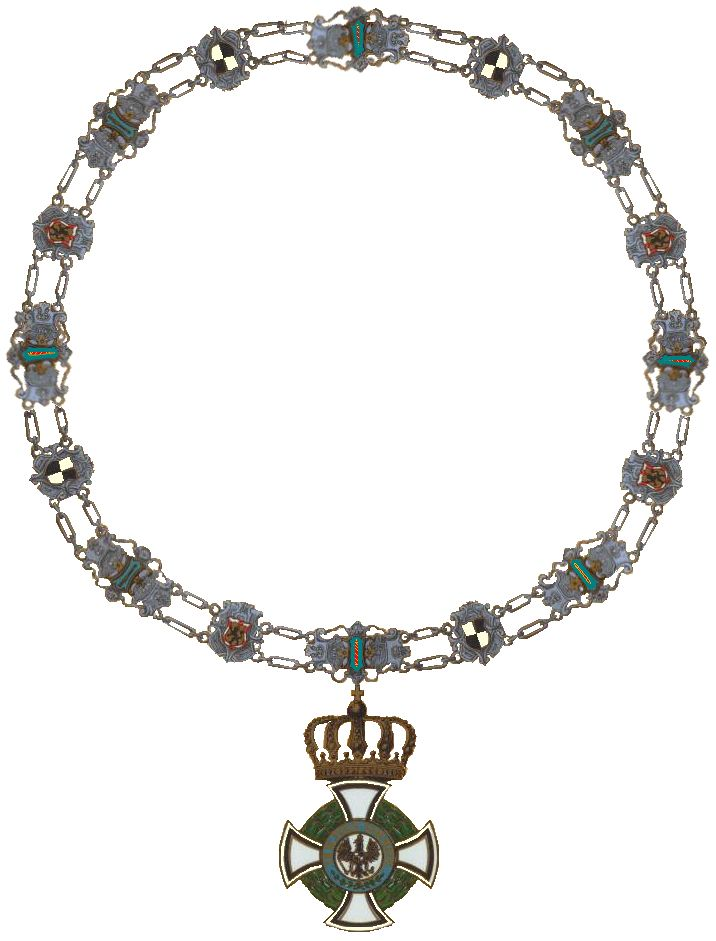
- Collar of the Order

Awarded by the House of Hohenzollern
- Type: State Order (formerly); House Order (currently)
- Royal house: House of Prussia; House of Hohenzollern
- Ribbon: White with 3 black stripes
- Status: Currently constituted
- Grand Masters: Georg Friedrich, Prince of Prussia; Karl Friedrich, Prince of Hohenzollern
- Grades: Grand Commander; Commander; Knight; Member

Precedence
- Next (higher): Order of the Crown; Pour le Mérite
- Related: Romanian House Order of Hohenzollern
- Ribbon of the Order

The House Order of Hohenzollern (German: Hausorden von Hohenzollern or Hohenzollernscher Hausorden) was a dynastic order of knighthood of the House of Hohenzollern awarded to military commissioned officers and civilians of comparable status. Associated with the various versions of the order were crosses and medals which could be awarded to lower-ranking soldiers and civilians.

== History ==
The Princely House Order of Hohenzollern originated in 1841, by joint decree of Prince Konstantin of Hohenzollern-Hechingen and Prince Karl Anton of Hohenzollern-Sigmaringen. These two principalities in southern Germany were Catholic collateral lines of the House of Hohenzollern, cousins to the Protestant ruling house of Prussia.

On 23 August 1851, after the two principalities had been annexed by Prussia, the order was adopted by the Prussian branch of the house. Also, although the two principalities had become an administrative region of the Prussian kingdom, the princely lines continued to award the order as a house order. The Prussian version was then known as the Royal House Order of Hohenzollern (Königlicher Hausorden von Hohenzollern or Königlich Hohenzollernscher Hausorden), to distinguish it from the Princely House Order of Hohenzollern (Fürstlicher Hausorden von Hohenzollern or Fürstlich Hohenzollernscher Hausorden). It was awarded mainly for service to the royal family. Although Kaiser Wilhelm II abdicated in 1918 as German Emperor and King of Prussia, he did not relinquish his role as Head of the Royal House and as such he was still able to confer the Royal House Order. The Princely House Order continued to be awarded, unofficially, after the fall of the German Monarchy.

Another development occurred in 1935. Prince Karl Anton's second son, Karl Eitel Friedrich of Hohenzollern-Sigmaringen, had become prince and then king of Romania as Carol I. Carol I had died childless and was succeeded by his nephew Ferdinand I, also of Hohenzollern-Sigmaringen. During the reign of Ferdinand's son King Carol II, the Romanian government established its own version of the House Order of Hohenzollern, known in Romanian as Ordinul "Bene Merenti" al Casei Domnitoare ("Order of 'Bene Merenti' of the Ruling House"). This form of the order existed until the Romanian monarchy was abolished in 1947; King Michael also awarded a slightly altered order in exile.

== Classes ==
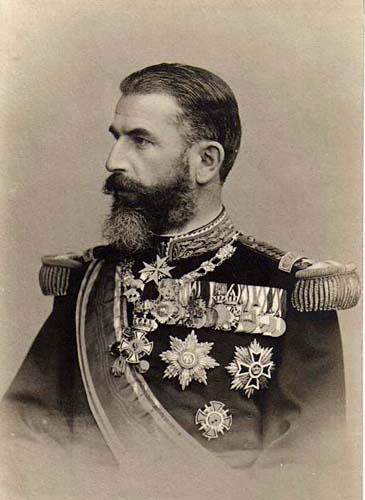
King Carol I of Romania, wearing the collar of the Royal House Order of Hohenzollern around his neck and the pinback Honor Cross 1st Class with Swords of the Princely House Order of Hohenzollern on his lower left breast. He also has a Knight's Cross with Swords of the Royal House Order of Hohenzollern on his medal bar.

=== Royal House Order ===
The Royal House Order of Hohenzollern came in the following classes:

- Grand Commander (Großkomtur)
- Commander (Komtur)
- Knight (Ritter)
- Member (Inhaber)

"Member" was a lesser class for soldiers who were not officers, as well as civilians. The Members' Cross (Kreuz der Inhaber), especially with swords, was a rare distinction for non-commissioned officers and the like. Another decoration, the Members' Eagle (Adler der Inhaber) was often given as a long-service award to lesser officials such as schoolteachers. The "Eagles" (the Members' Eagle and the Knights' Eagle, or Adler der Ritter) were solely civilian awards, and could not be awarded with swords. All other grades could be awarded with swords. During World War I, the Knight's Cross with Swords of the Royal House Order of Hohenzollern became in effect an intermediate award between the Iron Cross 1st Class and the Pour le Mérite for Prussian junior officers. When awarded with swords it was worn on the ribbon of the Iron Cross.

=== Princely House Order ===
The Princely House Order of Hohenzollern came in the following classes:

- Cross of Honour 1st Class (Ehrenkreuz 1. Klasse)
- Commander's Cross of Honour (Ehrenkomturkreuz)
- Cross of Honour 2nd Class (Ehrenkreuz 2. Klasse)
- Cross of Honour 3rd Class (Ehrenkreuz 3. Klasse)
- Golden Cross of Merit (goldenes Verdienstkreuz)
- Silver Cross of Merit (silbernes Verdienstkreuz)
- Golden Medal of Honour (goldene Ehrenmedaille)
- Silver Medal of Merit (silberne Verdienstmedaille)

The Crosses of Merit, Golden Medal of Honour and Silver Medal of Merit were lesser grades for non-commissioned officers, enlisted men and their civilian equivalents. All grades could be awarded with swords. During World War I, the appropriate grade of the Princely House Order was often awarded to officers and men of Füsilier-Regiment Fürst Karl Anton von Hohenzollern (Hohenzollernsches) Nr. 40, an infantry regiment raised in the principalities of Hohenzollern and whose honorary chief was the Prince of Hohenzollern. Soldiers in the regiment's sister reserve and Landwehr regiments also often received the decoration. Unlike the Royal House Order, awards of the Princely House Order were made on the standard ribbon of the order (the "statute" ribbon) regardless of whether they were with or without swords.

=== Romanian House Order ===
The classes of the Romanian version of the House Order were essentially the same as those of the Princely House Order, except that the Cross of Honour 3rd Class of the Romanian version could be awarded with Oak leaves, and the Golden and Silver Medals could be awarded with a Crown. As with the Prussian and Hohenzollern versions, crossed swords could be used to indicate a wartime or combat award. Given the short existence of the order and the fact that Romania had a number of other decorations for valor and military merit (Order of Michael the Brave, Order of the Star of Romania, Order of the Crown of Romania, Air Force Bravery Order, Cross of Military Virtue, Air Force and Naval Bravery Crosses, Crosses and Medals for Faithful Service, Medals for Steadfastness and Loyalty), awards of the Romanian version of the House Order with swords are uncommon.

== Insignia ==
The badge of the House Order of Hohenzollern was a cross pattée with convex edges and curved arms (sometimes called an "Alisee" cross). There were differences in the enameling of the arms of the cross for the Royal, Princely and Romanian versions, but all featured white enamel on the higher classes and a black enameled stripe near the sides of the cross. Between the arms of the cross was a wreath of laurel leaves (left side) and oak leaves (right side).

The cross bore a center medallion; the medallion and its band bore different coats of arms, mottos, dates and ciphers for each of the Royal, Princely and Romanian versions:

- The white-enameled medallion of the Royal House Order of Hohenzollern bore a black Prussian royal eagle with the Hohenzollern house coat of arms on a shield on the eagle's chest. Around the center medallion, a gold-rimmed band of blue enamel bore the motto in gold letters: vom Fels zum Meer ("From the cliffs to the sea"), with a wreath of laurel below. The white-enameled medallion on the reverse bore the cipher of King Frederick William IV of Prussia, the king when the order was founded. A gold-rimmed band of blue enamel bore the date den 18. Januar 1851 with a wreath of laurel leaves (left side) and oak leaves (right side).
- The white-enameled medallion of the Princely House Order of Hohenzollern bore the Hohenzollern coat of arms (a quartered shield of black and white) under a princely crown. Around the center medallion, a gold-rimmed band of blue enamel bore the motto in gold letters: für Treue und Verdienst ("For loyalty and merit") with a smaller wreath of oak leaves below. On most grades, the white-enameled medallion on the reverse bore the intertwined ciphers ("F" and "A") of Princes Friedrich (Konstantin's actual first name) and Anton, the princes who founded the order, under a princely crown. The gold-rimmed band of blue enamel bore one of several dates, depending on the class, such as den 5T April 1844 for the 2nd and 3rd Classes, with a wreath of laurel leaves below.

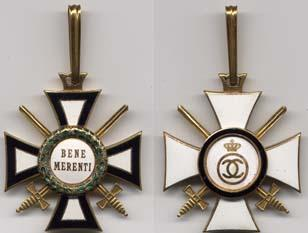
Romanian version for class of Commander (for military personnel)

- The white-enameled medallion of the Romanian House Order bore a black Romanian eagle with the Hohenzollern coat of arms on a shield on the eagle's chest. Around the center medallion, a gold-rimmed band of blue enamel bore the motto in gold letters: nihil sine Deo ("Nothing without God"). The white-enameled medallion on the reverse bore the crowned cipher of King Carol. The gold-rimmed band of blue enamel bore the date of the founding of the Romanian kingdom, 10 Februarie 1881.

The statute ribbon of the order was white with three black stripes (with slight variations among the Royal, Princely and Romanian versions).

== Notable recipients ==
As noted above, the Knight's Cross with Swords of the Royal House Order was the intermediate decoration between the Iron Cross 1st Class and the Pour le Mérite for Prussian junior officers. There were over 8,000 awards during World War I of this class (there were far fewer awards of the other classes, or of any class before the war). Thus, among the ranks of Imperial German Army junior officers who earned the Royal House Order as lieutenants, captains or majors in World War I are several hundred who reached the rank of general in the Wehrmacht in World War II.

=== Grand Commanders ===
- Prince Adalbert of Prussia (1811–1873)
- Prince Adalbert of Prussia (1884–1948)
- Prince Albert of Prussia (1809–1872)
- Prince Albert of Prussia (1837–1906)
- Albert, King of Saxony
- Archduke Albrecht, Duke of Teschen
- Duke Alexander of Oldenburg
- Prince Alexander of Prussia
- Alexander II of Russia
- Alexander III of Russia
- Grand Duke Alexei Alexandrovich of Russia
- Alfred, Duke of Saxe-Coburg and Gotha
- Amadeo I of Spain
- Prince Arnulf of Bavaria
- Prince Arthur, Duke of Connaught and Strathearn
- Prince August of Württemberg
- Prince August Wilhelm of Prussia
- Albert von Barnekow
- Bernhard III, Duke of Saxe-Meiningen
- Albrecht von Bernstorff
- Theobald von Bethmann Hollweg
- Gustav Friedrich von Beyer
- Herbert von Bismarck
- Otto von Bismarck
- Max von Bock und Polach
- Karl Heinrich von Boetticher
- Adolf von Bonin
- Julius von Bose
- Felix Graf von Bothmer
- Paul Bronsart von Schellendorff
- Bernhard von Bülow
- Karl von Bülow
- Leo von Caprivi
- Prince Charles of Prussia
- Charles I of Württemberg
- Charles Alexander, Grand Duke of Saxe-Weimar-Eisenach
- Chlodwig, Prince of Hohenlohe-Schillingsfürst
- Prince Christian of Schleswig-Holstein
- Constantine, Prince of Hohenzollern-Hechingen
- Edward VII
- Prince Eitel Friedrich of Prussia
- Ernst I, Duke of Saxe-Altenburg
- Ernest II, Duke of Saxe-Coburg and Gotha
- Ernest Louis, Grand Duke of Hesse
- Archduke Eugen of Austria
- August zu Eulenburg
- Botho zu Eulenburg
- Eduard von Fransecky
- Archduke Franz Ferdinand of Austria
- Franz Joseph I of Austria
- Prince Friedrich Heinrich Albrecht of Prussia
- Prince Friedrich Karl of Prussia (1828–1885)
- Prince Friedrich Karl of Prussia (1893–1917)
- Prince Friedrich Leopold of Prussia
- Prince Friedrich Sigismund of Prussia (1891–1927)
- Prince Friedrich Wilhelm of Prussia
- Frederick Francis II, Grand Duke of Mecklenburg-Schwerin
- Frederick Francis IV, Grand Duke of Mecklenburg-Schwerin
- Frederick I, Duke of Anhalt
- Frederick II, Grand Duke of Baden
- Frederick III, German Emperor
- Prince Frederick of Hohenzollern-Sigmaringen
- Prince Frederick of Prussia (1794–1863)
- Prince Frederick of the Netherlands
- Frederick William, Grand Duke of Mecklenburg-Strelitz
- Prince George, Duke of Cambridge
- Prince George of Prussia
- George, King of Saxony
- George II, Duke of Saxe-Meiningen
- George V
- George Victor, Prince of Waldeck and Pyrmont
- August Karl von Goeben
- Adolf von Glümer
- Günther Friedrich Karl II, Prince of Schwarzburg-Sondershausen
- Gustaf V
- Gustaf VI Adolf
- Gustav, Prince of Vasa
- Gottlieb Graf von Haeseler
- Wilhelm von Hahnke
- Benno Hann von Weyhern
- Paul von Hatzfeldt
- Heinrich VII, Prince Reuss of Köstritz
- Prince Henry of Prussia (1862–1929)
- Hermann, Prince of Hohenlohe-Langenburg
- Prince Hermann of Saxe-Weimar-Eisenach (1825–1901)
- Karl Eberhard Herwarth von Bittenfeld
- Paul von Hindenburg
- Hugo zu Hohenlohe-Öhringen
- Prince Joachim of Prussia
- Prince Johann Georg of Hohenzollern
- Karl Anton, Prince of Hohenzollern
- Karl Friedrich, Prince of Hohenzollern
- Archduke Karl Ludwig of Austria
- Karl Theodor, Duke in Bavaria
- Gustav von Kessel
- Grand Duke Konstantin Nikolayevich of Russia
- Leopold II of Belgium
- Prince Leopold of Bavaria
- Leopold, Prince of Hohenzollern
- Walter von Loë
- Louis III, Grand Duke of Hesse
- Louis IV, Grand Duke of Hesse
- Louis Ferdinand, Prince of Prussia
- Erich Ludendorff
- Luitpold, Prince Regent of Bavaria
- August von Mackensen
- Morell Mackenzie
- Edwin Freiherr von Manteuffel
- Otto Theodor von Manteuffel
- Maria Emanuel, Margrave of Meissen
- Prince Maximilian of Baden
- Albert von Maybach
- Grand Duke Michael Alexandrovich of Russia
- Helmuth von Moltke the Elder
- Georg Alexander von Müller
- Grand Duke Nicholas Konstantinovich of Russia
- Grand Duke Nicholas Nikolaevich of Russia (1831–1891)
- Nicholas II of Russia
- Hugo von Obernitz
- Oscar II
- Alexander August Wilhelm von Pape
- Hans von Plessen
- Hugo von Radolin
- Joseph von Radowitz
- Albrecht von Roon
- Ludwig Freiherr Roth von Schreckenstein
- Rudolf, Crown Prince of Austria
- Alfred von Schlieffen
- Prince Sigismund of Prussia (1896–1978)
- Otto Graf zu Stolberg-Wernigerode
- Alfred von Tirpitz
- Prince Tommaso, Duke of Genoa
- Victor I, Duke of Ratibor
- Victor Emmanuel III of Italy
- Viktor II, Duke of Ratibor
- Grand Duke Vladimir Alexandrovich of Russia
- Prince Waldemar of Prussia (1889–1945)
- Alfred von Waldersee
- Karl von Wedel
- August von Werder
- Wilhelm, German Crown Prince
- Wilhelm I, German Emperor
- Wilhelm II, German Emperor
- William II of Württemberg
- William III of the Netherlands
- William Ernest, Grand Duke of Saxe-Weimar-Eisenach
- Duke William of Mecklenburg-Schwerin
- William, Prince of Hohenzollern
- William, Prince of Wied
- Friedrich Graf von Wrangel

=== Commanders ===
- Gustav von Alvensleben
- Hans Hartwig von Beseler
- Moritz von Bissing
- Leonhard Graf von Blumenthal
- Arthur Collins
- Richard von Conta
- Adolf von Deines
- Karl von Einem
- Colmar Freiherr von der Goltz
- Hans Heinrich XV, Prince of Pless
- Prince Heinrich of Hesse and by Rhine
- Henning von Holtzendorff
- Gilbert Hamilton
- Dietrich von Hülsen-Haeseler
- Friedrich von Ingenohl
- Hans von Koester
- Prince Kraft of Hohenlohe-Ingelfingen
- Moriz von Lyncker
- Wilhelm Malte II
- Georg von der Marwitz
- Helmuth von Moltke the Younger
- Maximilian Karl Lamoral O'Donnell
- Philipp, Prince of Eulenburg
- Leopold von Ranke
- Walther Reinhardt
- Friedrich von Scholl
- Friedrich Graf von der Schulenburg
- Gustav von Senden-Bibran
- Karl Friedrich von Steinmetz
- Albrecht von Stosch
- Carl Ferdinand von Stumm-Halberg
- Wilhelm von Tümpling
- Julius von Verdy du Vernois
- Wilhelm von Wedell-Piesdorf

=== Knights ===
- Duke Adolf Friedrich of Mecklenburg
- Adolphus Frederick V, Grand Duke of Mecklenburg-Strelitz
- Adolphus Frederick VI, Grand Duke of Mecklenburg-Strelitz
- Albert I of Belgium
- Albert, 8th Prince of Thurn and Taxis
- Albrecht, Duke of Württemberg
- Alfred, 2nd Prince of Montenuovo
- Prince Anton of Hohenzollern-Sigmaringen
- Prince Arnulf of Bavaria
- Prince August, Duke of Dalarna
- Prince Augustus of Prussia
- Carol I of Romania
- Charles Egon III, Prince of Fürstenberg
- Eduard, Duke of Anhalt
- Duke Elimar of Oldenburg
- Emich, Prince of Leiningen
- Prince Ferdinand of Bavaria
- Ferdinand I of Romania
- Prince Franz of Bavaria
- Frederick I, Grand Duke of Baden
- Prince Frederick of Hohenzollern-Sigmaringen
- Frederick, Prince of Hohenzollern
- Prince Frederick of Prussia (1794–1863)
- Frederick Francis III, Grand Duke of Mecklenburg-Schwerin
- Frederick William IV of Prussia
- Friedrich II, Duke of Anhalt
- Archduke Friedrich, Duke of Teschen
- Georg, Crown Prince of Saxony
- Georg Alexander, Duke of Mecklenburg
- Prince Hermann of Saxe-Weimar-Eisenach (1825–1901)
- Joseph, Duke of Saxe-Altenburg
- Prince Kan'in Kotohito
- Prince Karl Anton of Hohenzollern
- Prince Karl Theodor of Bavaria
- Leopold, Hereditary Prince of Anhalt
- Manuel II of Portugal
- Maximilian Egon II, Prince of Fürstenberg
- Oscar I of Sweden
- Prince Oskar of Prussia
- Pedro V of Portugal
- Prince Philippe, Count of Flanders
- Duke Robert of Württemberg
- Rupprecht, Crown Prince of Bavaria
- Prince Waldemar of Prussia (1817–1849)
- Prince Wilhelm of Prussia (1783–1851)
- Wilhelm Karl, Duke of Urach
- Richard Ackermann
- Hans Ritter von Adam
- Conrad Albrecht
- Karl Allmenröder
- Ernst Freiherr von Althaus
- Joachim von Amsberg
- Karl Angerstein
- Leopold Anslinger
- Lothar von Arnauld de la Perière
- Hans-Jürgen von Arnim
- Heinrich Arntzen
- Kurt Assmann
- Harald Auffarth
- Gustav Bachmann
- Curt Badinski
- Hermann Balck
- Hartmuth Baldamus
- Max Bastian
- Paul Bäumer
- Hermann Bauer
- Ludwig Beck
- Carl Becker
- Hermann Becker
- Hans Behlendorff
- Wilhelm Behrens
- Wilhelm Berlin
- Fritz Otto Bernert
- Hans Berr
- Rudolf Berthold
- Hans Bethge
- Theobald von Bethmann Hollweg
- Helmuth Beukemann
- Arnold Freiherr von Biegeleben
- Paul Billik
- Georg von Bismarck
- Johannes Blaskowitz
- Werner von Blomberg
- Walter Blume
- Leonhard Graf von Blumenthal
- Günther Blumentritt
- Fedor von Bock
- Hermann Boehm
- Erwin Böhme
- Max von Boehn
- Oswald Boelcke
- Walter Boenicke
- Friedrich von Boetticher
- Hans Bohnenkamp
- Eberhardt Bohnstedt
- Carl Bolle
- Heinrich Bongartz
- Walter Böning
- Kuno-Hans von Both
- Felix Graf von Bothmer
- Walter Braemer
- Franz Brandt
- Adolf von Brauchitsch
- Walther von Brauchitsch
- Otto Brauneck
- Ferdinand von Bredow
- Hermann Breith
- Franz Breithaupt
- Arthur von Briesen
- Kurt von Briesen
- Fritz von Brodowski
- Helmut Brümmer-Patzig
- Paul von Bruns
- Hans-Joachim Buddecke
- Franz Büchner
- Julius Buckler
- Harry von Bülow-Bothkamp
- Walther Buhle
- Friedrich-Karl Burckhardt
- Wilhelm Burgdorf
- Ernst Busch
- Joachim von Busse
- Theodor Busse
- Eduard von Capelle
- Friedrich-Wilhelm von Chappuis
- Kurt von der Chevallerie
- Friedrich Christiansen
- Gerhard Conrad
- Otto Creutzmann
- Theodor Croneiss
- Hermann Dahlmann
- Alexander Edler von Daniels
- Franz Xaver Danhuber
- Jakob Ritter von Danner
- Carl Degelow
- Konrad Krafft von Dellmensingen
- Hermann Densch
- Friedrich-Wilhelm Dernen
- Karl Dönitz
- Kurt-Bertram von Döring
- Albert Dossenbach
- Eduard Ritter von Dostler
- Theodor Duesterberg
- Kurt Eberhard
- Johann-Heinrich Eckhardt
- Hans am Ende
- Theodor Endres
- Erwin Engelbrecht
- Franz Ritter von Epp
- Waldemar Erfurth
- Rudolf von Eschwege
- Walter Ewers
- Eduard Vogel von Falckenstein
- Alexander von Falkenhausen
- Eugen von Falkenhayn
- Kurt von Falkowski
- Hans Feige
- Hellmuth Felmy
- Karl Fischer von Treuenfeld
- Hermann Flörke
- Helmuth Förster
- Otto-Wilhelm Förster
- Hermann Foertsch
- Werner Forst
- Hermann von François
- Victor Franke
- Bruno Frankewitz
- Wilhelm Frankl
- Hans von Freden
- Otto Fretter-Pico
- Wilhelm Frickart
- Kurt Fricke
- Helmut Friebe
- Friedrich Friedrichs
- Werner von Fritsch
- Hermann Frommherz
- Werner Fürbringer
- Heinz Furbach
- Hans-Eberhardt Gandert
- Martin Gareis
- Otto von Garnier
- Heinrich Geigl
- Friedrich Gempp
- Alfred Gerstenberg
- Hermann Geyer
- Werner von Gilsa
- Colmar Freiherr von der Goltz
- Hermann Göring
- Otto Friedrich Ferdinand von Görschen
- Walter Göttsch
- Heinrich Gontermann
- Justus Grassmann
- Ulrich Grauert
- Robert Ritter von Greim
- Karl-Albrecht von Groddeck
- Wolfgang von Gronau
- Horst Großmann
- Franz Gürtner
- Curt Haase
- Albert Hackelsberger
- Hans Gottfried von Häbler
- Siegfried Haenicke
- Oskar von dem Hagen
- Erich Hahn
- Otto Hahn
- Franz Halder
- Kurt von Hammerstein-Equord
- Christian Hansen
- Ludwig Hanstein
- Georg von Hantelmann
- Otto Hasse
- Wilhelm Hasse
- Bruno Ritter von Hauenschild
- Paul Hausser
- Hans Hecker
- Heino von Heimburg
- Gotthard Heinrici
- Walter Heitz
- Alois Heldmann
- Franz Hemer
- Hans Ritter von Hemmer
- Georg Ritter von Hengl
- Sigfrid Henrici
- Albert Henze
- Maximilian von Herff
- Traugott Herr
- Friedrich Herrlein
- Karl Eberhard Herwarth von Bittenfeld
- Ernst Hess
- Wilhelm Heye
- Konstantin Hierl
- Erich Hoepner
- Fritz Höhn
- Walter Höhndorf
- Gustav Höhne
- Otto Höhne
- Franz Ritter von Hörauf
- Edmund Hoffmeister
- Adolf Wild von Hohenborn
- Harry Hoppe
- Hermann Hoth
- Hans Howaldt
- Hans-Valentin Hube
- Werner Hühner
- Heinrich-Hermann von Hülsen
- Dietrich von Hülsen-Haeseler
- Joachim-Friedrich Huth
- Max Immelmann
- Josef Jacobs
- Erich Jaschke
- Leo von Jena
- Ferdinand Jühlke
- Ernst Jünger
- Rudolf Kaempfe
- Leonhard Kaupisch
- Hugo von Kayser
- Walter Keiner
- Wilhelm Keitel
- Alfred Keller
- Hans von Keudell
- Werner Kienitz
- Eberhard Kinzel
- Heinrich Kirchheim
- Stefan Kirmaier
- Hans Kirschstein
- Otto Kissenberth
- Heinrich Kittel
- Hans Klein
- Johannes Klein
- Günther von Kluge
- Herbert Knappe
- Hermann Köhl
- Paul König
- Otto Könnecke
- Hans von Koester
- Waldemar Kophamel
- Fritz Kosmahl
- Dietrich Kraiss
- Walther Krause
- Fritz Ritter von Kraußer
- Hans Krebs
- Friedrich Freiherr Kress von Kressenstein
- Hans Kreysing
- Friedrich Wilhelm Kritzinger
- Heinrich Kroll
- Friedrich-Wilhelm Krüger
- Georg von Küchler
- Friedrich Kühn
- Walter Kuntze
- Eberhard von Kurowski
- Walter Kypke
- Otto Lancelle
- Arthur Laumann
- Wilhelm Ritter von Leeb
- Gustav Leffers
- Hans Leistikow
- Joachim Lemelsen
- Richard Lepper
- Magnus von Levetzow
- Hans-Georg Leyser
- Hermann von der Lieth-Thomsen
- Friedrich Wilhelm von Lindeiner-Wildau
- Wilhelm List
- Karl-Siegmund Litzmann
- Bruno Loerzer
- Erich Loewenhardt
- Johannes Lohs
- Fritz von Loßberg
- Alfons Luczny
- Max Ludwig
- Hartwig von Ludwiger
- Erich Lüdke
- Günther Lütjens
- Friedrich Lützow
- Kurt-Jürgen Freiherr von Lützow
- Siegfried Macholz
- Kurt Magnus
- Friedrich Mallinckrodt
- Helmuth von Maltzahn
- Erich von Manstein
- Wilhelm Marschall
- Hans-Georg von der Marwitz
- Franz Mattenklott
- Rudolf Meister
- Carl Menckhoff
- Klemens von Metternich
- Georg Meyer
- Walter Model
- Wolfgang Muff
- Arthur Mülverstedt
- Edmund Nathanael
- Max Näther
- Ulrich Neckel
- Karl August Nerger
- Friedrich Noltenius
- August Ludwig von Nostitz
- Karl Odebrett
- Theo Osterkamp
- Eugen Ott
- Otto Parschau
- Richard Pellengahr
- Rudolf Peschel
- Nicolae Petrescu-Comnen
- Walter Petzel
- Max Pfeffer
- Hans Martin Pippart
- Karl von Plettenberg
- Gunther Plüschow
- Georg-Wilhelm Postel
- Werner Preuss
- Fritz Pütter
- Theodor Quandt
- Friedrich von Rabenau
- Antoni Wilhelm Radziwiłł
- Erich Raeder
- Adolf Raegener
- Arthur Rahn
- Johann von Ravenstein
- Hubert von Rebeur-Paschwitz
- Walter von Reichenau
- Hermann Reinecke
- Wilhelm Reinhard (pilot)
- Wilhelm Reinhard (SS officer)
- Georg-Hans Reinhardt
- Ludwig von Reuter
- Lothar von Richthofen
- Manfred von Richthofen
- Willy Rohr
- Hans Rolfes
- Hans Rose
- Friedrich Ritter von Röth
- Karl Rothenburg
- Hellmuth von Ruckteschell
- Günther Rüdel
- Gerd von Rundstedt
- Alfred Saalwächter
- Gotthard Sachsenberg
- Reinhold Saltzwedel
- Erwin Sander
- Werner Sanne
- Dietrich von Saucken
- Karl Emil Schäfer
- Bruno Schatz
- Hans-Karl von Scheele
- Reinhard Scheer
- Anton Schifferer
- Hans Schilling
- Franz Schleiff
- Alfred Schlemm
- Georg Schlenker
- Alfred von Schlieffen
- Eberhard Graf von Schmettow
- Arthur Schmidt
- August Schmidt
- Gustav Schmidt
- Hans Schmidt
- Julius Schmidt
- Otto Schmidt
- Eugen Ritter von Schobert
- Viktor Schobinger
- Carl-August von Schoenebeck
- Otto von Schrader
- Ludwig von Schroeder
- Walther Schroth
- Albrecht Schubert
- Otto Schultze
- Johannes Schulz
- Karlgeorg Schuster
- Günter Schwartzkopff
- Viktor von Schwedler
- Walther Schwieger
- Walther von Seydlitz-Kurzbach
- Gustav Sieß
- Johann Sinnhuber
- Friedrich Sixt von Armin
- Karl-Wilhelm Specht
- Hugo Sperrle
- Johannes Spieß
- Walter Stennes
- Paul Strähle
- Peter Strasser
- Adolf Strauss
- Kurt Student
- Carl-Heinrich von Stülpnagel
- Otto von Stülpnagel
- Wolff von Stutterheim
- Walter Surén
- Albrecht von Thaer
- Emil Thuy
- Horst Julius Freiherr Treusch von Buttlar-Brandenfels
- Adolf von Trotha
- Erich von Tschischwitz
- Adolf Ritter von Tutschek
- Ernst Udet
- Max Ulich
- Walter von Unruh
- Emil Uzelac
- Josef Veltjens
- Heinrich von Vietinghoff
- Nikolaus von Vormann
- Werner Voss
- Waldemar Wappenhans
- Franz Walz
- Walter Warzecha
- Erich Rüdiger von Wedel
- Helmuth Weidling
- Friedrich-August Weinknecht
- Hans Weiss
- Ernst von Weizsäcker
- Richard Wenzl
- Wilhelm Werner
- Wilhelm Wetzel
- Georg Wetzell
- Walther Wever
- Thomas-Emil von Wickede
- Gustav Anton von Wietersheim
- Ulrich von Wilamowitz-Moellendorf
- Helmuth Wilberg
- Rudolf Windisch
- Erwin von Witzleben
- Kurt Wolff
- Eberhard Wolfram
- Gustav Adolf von Wulffen
- Kurt Wüsthoff
- Heinz Ziegler
- Hans Zorn

=== Members ===
- Prince Albert of Saxe-Altenburg
- Fritz Beckhardt
- Sebastian Festner
- Friedrich Wilhelm Prinz von Hohenzollern
- Fritz Kosmahl
- Prince Kraft of Hohenlohe-Ingelfingen
- Max Ritter von Müller
- Prince Nicholas of Romania
- Karl Thom

=== Unknown class ===
- Hugo Rüdel
