= Joachim von Amsberg =

Joachim von Amsberg may refer to:

- Joachim von Amsberg (general) (1869–1945), German general
- Joachim von Amsberg (colonel) (1903–1981), oberst in the Wehrmacht
- Joachim von Amsberg (banker) (born 1964), German banker and a Vice President of the World Bank

== See also ==
- House of Amsberg
