= Lepper =

Lepper may refer to:

- Andrzej Lepper (1954–2011), Polish Deputy Prime Minister, Deputy Marshal of the Sejm, Ministry of Agriculture
- Barney Lepper (1898–1985), American football player
- Brad Lepper (born 1955), American archaeologist
- David Lepper (born 1945), British politician
- Elizabeth Lepper CBE (1883–1971), British physician and pathologist
- John Lepper (born 1934), American politician
- Mark Lepper (born 1944), American psychologist
- Mary M. Lepper (died 1984), American political scientist
- Merry Lepper (born 1942), American long-distance runner
- Mihkel Lepper (1900–1980), Estonian actor
- Richard Lepper (1897–1943), German Wehrmacht general
- Robert Lepper (1906–1991), American artist and art professor
- Roberta Lepper (born 1978), Fijian sailor
- Ruth Rhoads Lepper Gardner (1905 – 2011), American artist and mapmaker
- Simon Lepper, British pianist
- Verena Lepper (born 1973), German egyptologist and semitist

== See also ==
- Leper, one who suffers from leprosy
