= Wilhelm Frickart =

German World War I flying ace (born 1893)

- Military career
- Allegiance: Germany
- Branch: Aviation
- Rank: Leutnant
- Units: Flieger-Abteilung 24/Flieger-Abteilung 242; Flieger-Abteilung 20; Jagdstaffel 64; Jagdstaffel 65
- Commands: Jagdstaffel 65
- Awards: Royal House Order of Hohenzollern; Iron Cross; Silver and Bronze award of Austro-Hungarian Medal for Bravery

Leutnant Wilhelm Frickart was a World War I flying ace credited with twelve aerial victories. He is the only known German observer to become an ace balloon buster. After pilot training, he scored five additional victories, to become an ace a second time.

== Biography ==
=== Early life ===
Wilhelm Maxmilian Frickart was born in Engers, the German Empire on 25 July 1893.

=== Military service in Russia ===
Frickart was originally assigned to duty as an observer/gunner on the Russian Front with FA 24 (later redubbed FA 242). He scored his first victory on 12 April 1917, teaming with Leopold Anslinger to shoot down a Voisin. He followed up for a second one on 27 April. Between 15 and 28 June, he shot down five Russian observation balloons.

=== Military service in France ===
Frickart then went for pilot training, and was consequently assigned to FA 20 on the Western Front. He had three wins there, only one of which, scored on 17 March 1918, was confirmed. From there, he progressed to flying fighters for Jagdstaffel 64 in mid-1918. He then moved to Jagdstaffel 65 on 19 August 1918 as deputy commander under fellow ace Otto Fitzner, and intermittently commanded the squadron while scoring his last four wins between 30 August and 4 October 1918.
