= August Hanko (military personnel) =

- Born: Unknown
- Died: Unknown
- Military career
- Allegiance: German Empire
- Branch: Army; flying service
- Rank: Leutnant
- Units: Feldflieger Abteilung (Field Flier Detachment) 38; Kampfgeschwader (Tactical Bomber Wing) II; Jagdstaffel 20 (Fighter Squadron 20); Jagdstaffel 28 (Fighter Squadron 28)
- Commands: Jagdstaffel 64 (Fighter Squadron 64)
- Awards: Military Merit Cross

Lieutenant August Hanko was a German World War I flying ace credited with five aerial victories.

== Biography ==
August Hanko's origins are unknown. He first served in the German infantry in the early stages of World War I. In 1915, he joined Die Fliegertruppen (Imperial German Air Service). He first served with Feldflieger Abteilung (Field Flier Detachment) 38, then with Kampfgeschwader (Tactical Bomber Wing) 2. Hanko then progressed to fighter pilot's training. Upon graduation, he was posted to his first fighter squadron, Jagdstaffel 20, on 2 November 1916.

On 24 January 1917, he transferred to Jagdstaffel 28. He scored his first aerial victory on 22 April 1917, downing a Nieuport 17 from No. 1 Squadron RFC in a morning fight. Lieutenant AW Wood, the pilot, was wounded, but survived to be taken prisoner. Another 1 Squadron Nieuport followed on 7 May. On 25 May, he shot down a Royal Aircraft Factory FE.2d from No. 20 Squadron RFC piloted by eventual 11-kill ace Lt. Campbell Hoy who was injured. He was awarded Germany's highest decoration for enlisted men, the Military Merit Cross, on 28 June 1917.

Hanko went on to down an Airco DH.4 from No. 57 Squadron RFC on 21 August 1917. On 16 September, he became an ace when he shot down a Martinsyde Elephant from No. 27 Squadron RFC.

On 24 January 1918, having been commissioned a Leutnant, he was given command of Jagdstaffel 64. He led them without personal result until being removed from duty for illness on 7 July 1918.

Hanko's subsequent life is unknown.
