= Friedrich Mallinckrodt =

German test pilot and flying ace during WW1

Friedrich von Mallinckrodt
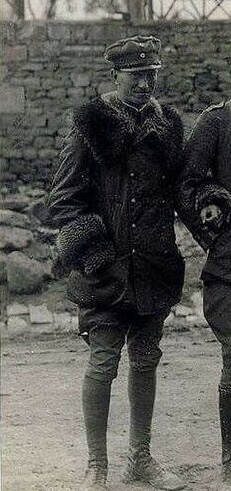
- Cropped photo of Von Mallinckrodt
- Born: 15 August 1894; Essen, German Empire
- Died: 2 August 1941 (aged 46)
- Military career
- Allegiance: German Empire; Kaiser Wilhelm II
- Branch: Fliegertruppen/Luftstreitkräfte
- Rank: Leutnant (Lieutenant)
- Units: Kampfeinsitzerkommando Sivry (Combat Single-Seater Command Sivry), Jagdstaffel 6, Jagdstaffel 20
- Awards: Royal House Order of Hohenzollern

Leutnant Friedrich von Mallinckrodt (15 August 1894 – 2 August 1941) was a German World War I test pilot and flying ace credited with six aerial victories.

== Biography ==
=== Early life ===
Friedrich von Mallinckrodt was born on 15 August 1894 in Essen, the German Empire.

=== Military service ===
Friedrich von Mallinckrodt served in the infantry in the 70th Regiment of Foot, in which he enlisted before the war. In May 1915 he was commissioned as a Leutnant. On 6 July 1915 he transferred to the Luftstreitkräfte.

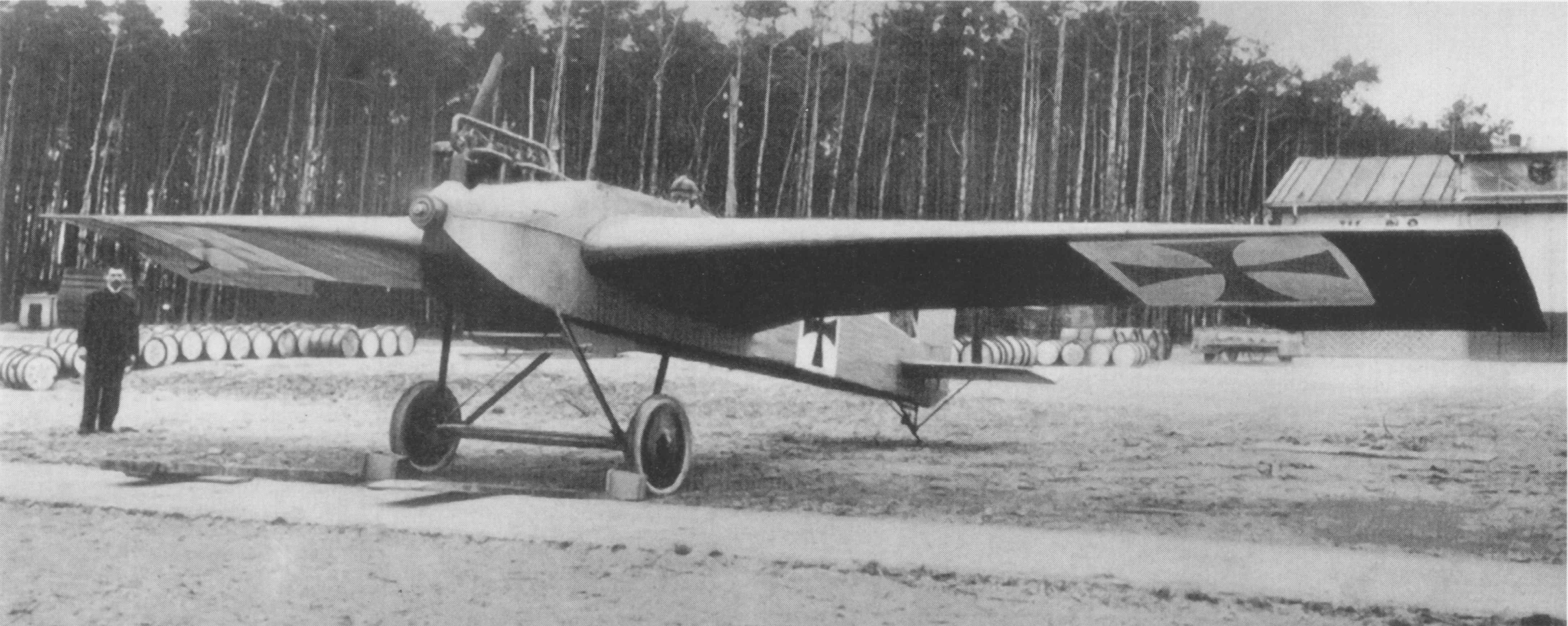
The Junkers J.1 Blechesel

On 12 December 1915 he was the pilot on the first test flight of the Junkers J 1, the world's first all-metal aircraft.

After training, beginning in January 1916, he served in the 5th Kagohl, a tactical bomber wing. By April 1916, he was transferred to an ad hoc fighter unit, Kampfeinsitzerkommando Sivry (Combat Single-Seater Command Sivry). While near Verdun on 30 April, he claimed his first enemy aircraft shot down; the victory went unconfirmed. On 10 September, he was posted to a fighter squadron, Jagdstaffel 6. He would not score his first official victory until 28 October 1916, when he downed a Caudron over Villeselve. Once returned to Jasta 6, he had another unconfirmed victory on 30 December 1916.

Mallinckrodt scored his second confirmed win, over a Sopwith 1 1/2 Strutter on 4 January 1917. His combat career was interrupted by a brief stint as an instructor at the Jastaschule at Valenciennes. He then transferred to another fighter squadron, Jagdstaffel 20. In March 1917, he got four confirmed victories in an eight-day stretch, to bring his total tally to six. On 30 April, he was wounded for the fifth time; this one was severe enough to remove him from combat duty. After recovery, he was assigned to the Technical Commission of the Luftstreitkräfte for the remainder of the war.

Friedrich Mallinckrodt was awarded the Knight's Cross of the House Order of Hohenzollern. As German medals were awarded in a progressive fashion, this meant that he almost certainly won both classes of the Iron Cross. Also, five wounds should have qualified him for the Wound Badge.

=== Later life ===
Following WWI, Mallinckrodt was employed by Fokker as a test pilot. He began an affair with Anthony Fokker's wife Elisabeth "Tetta" von Morgen, precipitating Fokker to divorce her on 11 October 1923. Mallinckrodt and Tetta were married in Berlin on 18 December 1923, but their marriage lasted only two years.

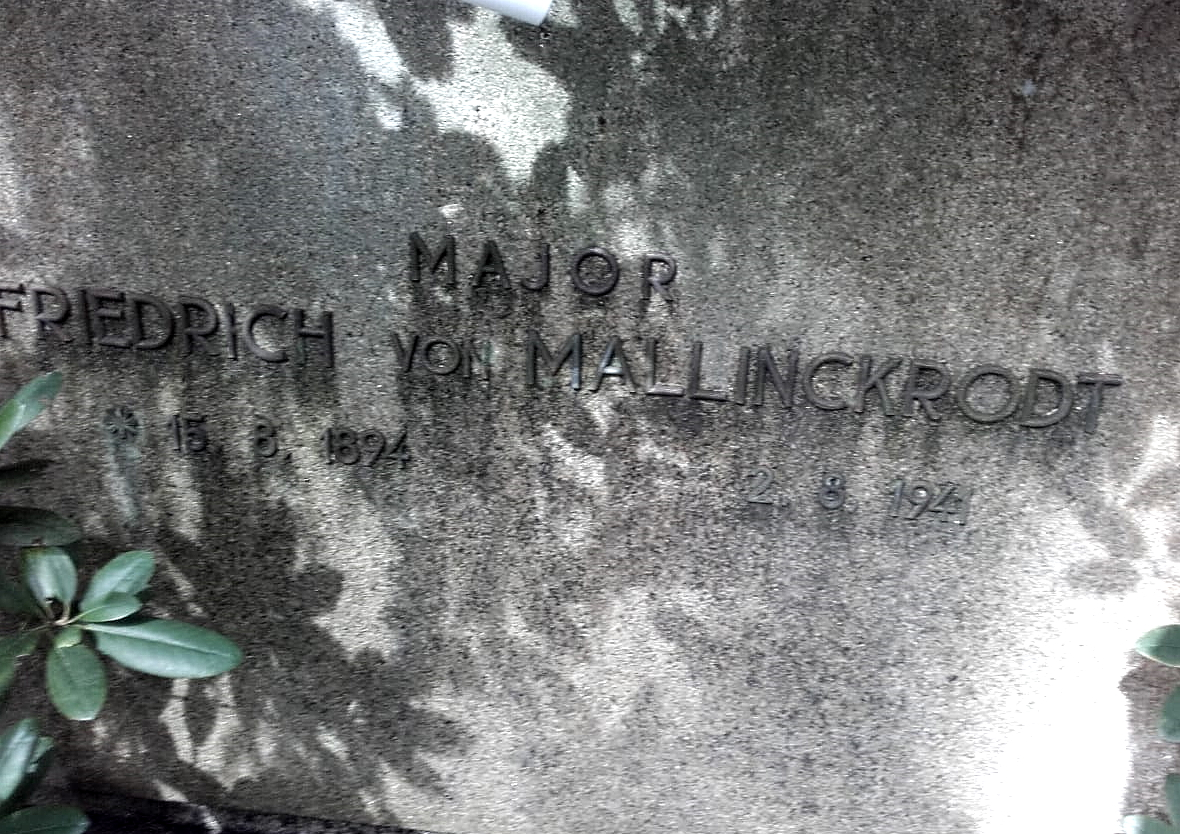
Mallinckrodt grave in Stahnsdorf

During the Second World War he served as a Major at the Luftwaffe Air Force Test Center at Rechlin–Lärz Airfield. He died in a plane crash on 2 August 1941 northeast of Rechlin and was buried in the Stahnsdorf South-Western Cemetery.
