= Fritz Kosmahl =

German World War I flying ace (1892–1917)

Fritz Gustav August Kosmahl
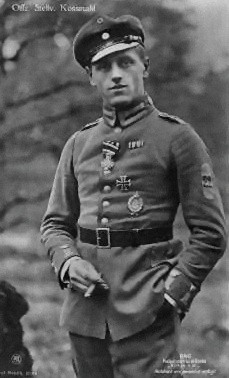
- Fritz Kosmahl
- Born: 5 September 1892; Leipzig
- Died: 26 September 1917 (aged 25)
- Military career
- Allegiance: German Empire
- Branch: Aviation
- Service years: 1914–1917
- Rank: Offizierstellvertreter
- Units: Feldflieger Abteilung 22/261; Jagdstaffel 26
- Awards: Prussia: House Order of Hohenzollern; Prussia: Iron Cross First and Second Class; Saxe-Meiningen: Medal for Merit in War

Offizierstellvertreter Fritz Gustav August Kosmahl HOH, IC (5 September 1892—26 September 1917) was one of the first flying aces of Germany's Luftstreitkräfte during World War I. He was one of the few German two-seater aces of the war, being officially credited with nine aerial victories. He was also one of the first ten German aviators to earn the Royal House Order of Hohenzollern.

== Early life ==
Fritz Gustav August Kosmahl was born on 5 September 1892 in Leipzig.

== World War I military service ==
Kosmahl started pilot's training very early in World War I, on 12 August 1914, at Fliegerersatz-Abteilung 2. On 11 January 1915, he joined Feldflieger Abteilung 22 in France. During 1916, he scored three aerial victories while operating a two-seater reconnaissance plane; details of his first two wins is lost to history, but his third win came on 10 October 1916. As a result, on 9 January 1917, Kosmahl was awarded the Member's Cross with Swords of the House Order of Hohenzollern. He was one of the first ten German fliers to receive this prestigious award, second only to the famed Blue Max. He was also awarded the Saxe-Meiningen Medal for Merit in War while with Feldflieger Abteilung 22. He also won both classes of the Iron Cross.

Feldflieger Abteilung 22 morphed into Feldflieger Abteilung 261 in December 1916. On 2 February 1917, Kosmahl shot down a Sopwith Pup piloted by acting Flight Lieutenant W.E.Traynor of 8 squadron RNAS over Hermies. On 11 March, he downed a Royal Aircraft Factory FE.2b south of Beugny and became an ace. He then departed for advanced training, to become a fighter pilot. In late July 1917, he was assigned to Jagdstaffel 26. On 17 August, he scored his first win as a fighter pilot, downing an RAF FE.2d at Zonnebeke. On 9 September, Kosmahl downed a Sopwith Camel fighter plane. On both 19 and 20 September, he shot down Sopwith Triplane fighters at Passchendaele.

Two days later, on 22 September 1917, Fritz Kosmahl suffered a stomach wound in combat, but managed to return to base despite his injury. He lingered four days after landing, succumbing at 0230 hours on 26 September 1917.

== Bibliography ==
- Above the Lines: The Aces and Fighter Units of the German Air Service, Naval Air Service and Flanders Marine Corps, 1914-1918. Norman L. R. Franks, Frank W. Bailey, Russell Guest. Grub Street, 1993. ISBN 0-948817-73-9, ISBN 978-0-948817-73-1.
