= Anslinger =

Anslinger (German: habitational name for someone from Langenenslingen in Baden-Württemberg) is a surname. Notable people with the surname include:

- Harry J. Anslinger (1892–1975), American government official
- Leopold Anslinger (1891–1978), German World War I flying ace
