= Walter Göttsch =

German World War I flying ace (1896-1918)

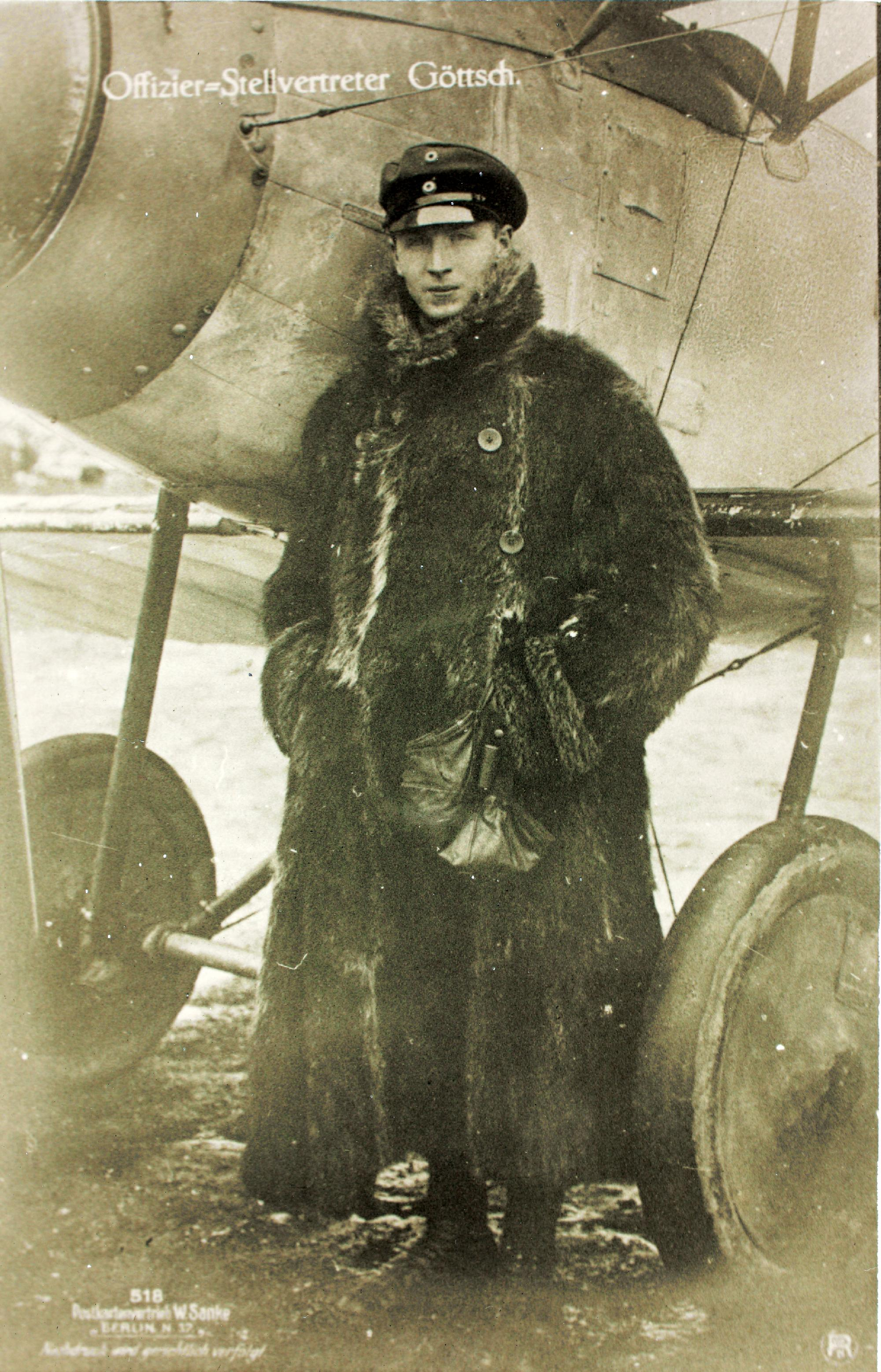
- Born: 10 June 1896; Altona, Hamburg, Germany
- Died: 10 April 1918 (aged 21); Gentelles, France
- Military career
- Allegiance: German Empire
- Branch: Aviation
- Service years: 1915–1918
- Rank: Leutnant
- Units: Flieger-Abteilung 33; Jagdstaffel 8
- Commands: Jagdstaffel 19
- Conflicts: World War I
- Awards: Royal House Order of Hohenzollern; Iron Cross

Leutnant Walter Göttsch HoH, IC (10 June 1896—10 April 1918) was a German World War I flying ace credited with 20 aerial victories. His final combat assignment was commanding Jagdstaffel 19 in Jagdgeschwader II.

== Early life and service ==
Walter Göttsch was born in Altour, Germany on 10 June 1896. He volunteered for the German army on 1 July 1915. He was originally assigned to Flieger-Abteilung 33 to fly artillery cooperation missions in Flanders as a Vizefeldwebel.

== Service as a fighter pilot ==
After training as a fighter pilot, Göttsch was assigned to Royal Prussian Jagdstaffel 8 on 10 September 1916. On 4 November 1916, he destroyed a Belgian observation balloon for his first victory. He then scored twice more before winning a momentous dogfight on 7 January 1917; his opponent that day was Thomas Mottershead, who won a posthumous Victoria Cross. Göttsch won a double victory on 1 February, but then was shot down and wounded in action for the first time two days later.

Because of his wounding, he would not score again until 6 April 1917. By 5 May, he had doubled his victory total to twelve. He was once again downed, probably by the observer of Harry G. E. Luchford's Royal Aircraft Factory FE.2d on 29 June. After this wounding, he did not win again until 17 July 1917. By 16 September, he had pushed his tally to 17, downing a Sopwith Camel that day. On 25 September, he fell under the guns of a Bristol F.2 Fighter, wounded once again in the same combat that saw Rudolf Wendelmuth's downing. Göttsch returned to duty, but had no luck, being wounded for the fourth time on 25 November 1917 by James Dennis Payne.

== Command and death ==
Göttsch would not return to action until January 1918. On 14 February, he was given command of Royal Prussian Jagdstaffel 19. The new Staffelführer would score only twice before his end, with back to back triumphs on 31 March and 1 April.

Göttsch was killed in action on 10 April 1918 over Gentelles, apparently by return fire from the observer of an RE-8 (his final victim), although German accounts also claim he was hit by ground fire. His Fokker Dr.I triplane, marked with a white swastika, fell behind British lines and was salvaged. Walter Göttsch's 20 victories included seven from 20 Squadron RAF; the score of victories would also have qualified him for a Blue Max had he survived.

== Honors and awards ==
- Iron Cross Second and First Class
- Knight's Cross with Swords of the House Order of Hohenzollern: 23 August 1917
