= Oskar von dem Hagen =

German military officer

- Born: April 13, 1883; Annaburg, Sachsen, Weimar Republic (present-day Germany)
- Died: May 17, 1940 (aged 57) Ossendrecht, Netherlands
- Cause of death: Killed in action during the Battle of Zeeland
- Buried: Ysselsteyn, Netherlands
- Allegiance: German Empire; Weimar Republic; Nazi Germany
- Branch: Imperial German Army; Reichsheer; German Army
- Service years: 1902–1940 (38 years)
- Rank: Generalmajor der Infanterie
- Conflicts: World War I World War II
- Awards: Knight's Cross of the Iron Cross

Oskar von dem Hagen (1883–1940) was a German military officer who played significant roles during both the First World War and the Second World War.

== Career ==
=== World War I ===
During the First World War, Hagen served as an officer in the German Army as a part of the Feldflieger Abteilung.

Hagen held positions such as Bildoffizier (photo reconnaissance officer) in the Feldflieger-Abteilung 12 and later became the leader of the Feldflieger-Abteilung 7 and Feldflieger-Abteilung 57. His service extended to being the Gruppenführer der Flieger 3 and Gruppenführer der Flieger 1.

For his contributions during the war, he received military honors including both classes of the Iron Cross, the Royal House Order of Hohenzollern with Swords, and other decorations.

=== Interwar period and World War II ===
After World War I, Hagen transitioned to the Reichswehr. (Note: German Army during the Weimar Republic) He held various positions, including serving in the Abteilung Fremde Heere and later as the commander of the Truppenübungsplatz Neuhammer. In 1935, he joined the Wehrmacht and continued his military career. When the Second World War began, he commanded the Infantry Regiment 376 and was killed in action as a colonel on the Western Front near Ossendrecht, Netherlands on May 17, 1940.

Hagen was posthumously promoted to the rank of Generalmajor, along with receiving Oak Leaves to his Iron Cross posthumously, of which only 95 people ever received after death.

== Sources ==
- Markus, Rövekamp; Karl Friedrich, Hildebrand; Bradley, Dermot. Die Generale Des Heeres 1921-1945 : Die Militärischen Werdegänge Der Generale Sowie Der Ärzte Veterinäre Intendanten Richter Und Ministerialbeamten Im Generalsrang (in German). Osnabrück: Biblio. OCLC 19932004.
- Gotha Genealogical Paperback of the Prehistoric Houses. The nobility native to Germany (Uradel). 1908. Ninth year, Justus Perthes, Gotha 1907, pp. 272–273.
