= Raven Freiherr von Barnekow =

German World War I flying ace

- Born: 10 March 1897; Schwerin, Germany
- Died: 8 December 1941 (aged 44); Alt Marrin, Kolberg, Pomerania, Nazi Germany
- Military career
- Allegiance: Germany
- Branch: Cavalry; infantry; aviation
- Rank: Leutnant
- Units: 2nd Guards Uhlan Regiment, 4th Guards Foot Regiment, FEA 5, Jagdstaffel 11, Jagdstaffel 4, Jagdstaffel 20, Jagdstaffel 1
- Other work: On staff of Lieutenant General Kurt-Bertram von Döring during World War II

Leutnant Raven Erik Freiherr von Barnekow (10 March 1897 – 8 December 1941) was a German World War I flying ace credited with eleven aerial victories. Postwar, he emigrated to the United States and became romantically involved with movie star Kay Francis. He went on to serve the Nazis during the early days of World War II before committing suicide.

== Early life ==
Raven Erik Freiherr von Barnekow was born 10 March 1897 in Schwerin, the German Empire.

== World War I service ==
Barnekow served in the ranks of the 2nd Guards Uhlan Regiment before being commissioned on 3 March 1915. He was transferred to 4th Guards Foot Regiment to serve as an officer. He volunteered for aviation in February 1917, and went originally to FEA 5. He then began transferring back-and-forth between Jagdstaffel 4 and Jagdstaffel 11. He joined Jasta 4 in September, went to Jasta 11 in December, back to Jasta 4 in February 1918. He then was forwarded to Jagdstaffel 20 on 10 March. He scored his first victory with them, shooting down ace Henry Eric Dolan on 12 May 1918. He scored three more wins with them, between 29 May and 15 June. On 23 August, he was wounded in action. He became an ace with his 2 September victory. He was then transferred to Jagdstaffel 1, and won a double victory on 27 September 1918, followed up by four more enemy aircraft destroyed in the first week of October, despite a slight wound on the 2nd.

== Between the wars ==
In 1924, Barnekow was one of the German pilots who evaded the Treaty of Versailles and secretively founded the Luftwaffe in Russia. That same year, he married an American debutante. They had one son, and divorced in 1929. In 1933, Barnekow met his old flying comrade Ernst Udet in New York. They unenthusiastically discussed joining the Nazi Party. Both expressed distaste for Adolf Hitler.

Barnekow worked in the New York office of General Motors for a while. He also claimed to be making diesel aircraft engines. Then, while negotiating with Trans World Airlines in Los Angeles, Barnekow again found romance. Barnekow met actress Kay Francis in Summer 1937. She believed him a handsome sophisticated wealthy man; he claimed he was the heir to a mining fortune. She overlooked his heavy drinking and misogynistic attitudes. Because he sometimes departed on unexpected secretive trips, he was suspected of being a German spy. At one point, he initiated an unsuccessful slander suit in which he claimed Francis' hostess, Countess Dorothy di Frasso, had called him such. When discussing the suit, he told newsmen he was an American citizen.

Nevertheless, he and Francis were romantically involved. While posing as a wealthy businessman, he borrowed $1,300 from Francis; she also paid off about $2,000 of his debts. He made a business trip to Germany in November and December 1938. Upon his return to the U.S., Barnekow settled in San Francisco in May 1939. To shield him from being interned as an enemy alien when war broke out, Francis proposed marriage and retirement to Hawaii. It was over her protest that Barnekow returned to Germany in September 1939.

== World War II ==
Barnekow had served with, and become close friends with, Ernst Udet and Kurt-Bertram von Döring during World War I. Barnekow applied to his old friends Udet and Döring for employment. Döring, who had been Barnekow's commanding officer in Jasta 4, had risen to Lieutenant General by the time World War II started; he added Barnekow to his staff. Assigned to intelligence gathering, he suffered a heart attack. Udet committed suicide on 17 November 1941; however, the Nazis lied and claimed he had died an accidental death. Barnekow refused to work for Udet's successor, Erhard Milch. Barnekow was disheartened by Udet's death and America's entry into war. Although Barnekow's date of death is given as 8 December 1941, some sources state he actually shot himself during a "hunting trip" some days later. He was 44 years old.
