= Battle of Zeeland =

1940 German victory in the Netherlands

- Part of the Battle of France
Date	10–18 May 1940
Location	Dutch province of Zeeland
Result	German victory

Belligerents
Netherlands; France; United Kingdom	Germany

Commanders and leaders
(Netherlands) Henri Winkelman (Netherlands) H. J. van der Stad (French Third Republic) Henri Giraud	(Nazi Germany) Paul Hausser (Nazi Germany) O. von dem Hagen †

Strength
Netherlands: 10,000 soldiers France: 15,000 soldiers Britain: 2 destroyers	7,500 soldiers

Casualties and losses
Dutch: 38 killed 115 wounded 9,847 captured French: 229 killed 700 wounded 3,000 captured 5+ armoured cars destroyed 1+ fighter destroyed British: 6 fighters destroyed	97 killed 300 wounded 3 aircraft destroyed

The Battle of Zeeland occurred on the Western Front during the early stages of the German assault on France and the Low Countries during World War II. Several Dutch and French units attempted to hold off the German onslaught by making a determined defense of the Dutch province of Zeeland. The battle lasted eight days and was a defeat for the French and Dutch forces defending the province.

== Defenses and troops in the province ==
The province of Zeeland had received little attention from the Dutch government prior to the German invasion of the Low Countries in May 1940. On 10 May, the Germans launched their attack.

In an attempt to raise morale amongst the Allies and to stem the tide of the German onslaught, several Dutch battalions—most notably the 14th Border Infantry Battalion—rapidly constructed defensive lines in Zeeland. The first—the Bathline (named after the nearby medieval fortress of Bath)—was little more than a tank barrier, slightly reinforced with 12 concrete casements. The second—and more defensible line—was the Zanddijkline, approximately 15 km (9.3 mi) west of the Bathline. This position was actually two lines, (a frontline and a stopline). It was defended by just two infantry battalions, the 3rd Battalion of the 38th Infantry Regiment and the 1st Battalion of the 40th Infantry Regiment, supported by limited and obsolete AA guns, a number of mortars and some light field artillery.

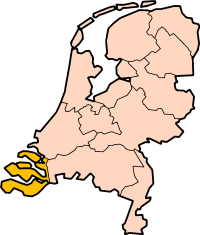
The province of Zeeland

== Battle ==
=== 10 May ===
On the first day, neither sides' troops engaged each other. The Germans were awaiting reinforcements from other sectors of their occupied territory, the Dutch were improving their defenses and waiting for the arrival of a contingent of French troops. The only action that occurred was the repeated strafing of the Dutch positions by German planes.

=== 11 May ===
Early on the morning of 11 May, the first companies of the French detachment began to arrive. The French force consisted of five infantry regiments, (loosely compiled into the 68th Infantry Division), and three Reconnaissance Groups (the 59th, 60th, and 68th).

In the early afternoon, two French mail-boats (Rouen and Cote d'Argent)—escorted by the French ships (Cyclone and Sirocco) and the British destroyers HMS Valentine and Winchester—arrived at Vlissingen. They were attacked by German bombers, but the aircraft were quickly driven away by AA guns. Another convoy arrived, and German aircraft attacked again, but were once more driven off although they did shoot down one French fighter.

Throughout the day, British Hurricanes had been seen over the province. They engaged the Luftwaffe many times, shooting down three German planes, losing six of their own in the process. German planes dropped a series of bombs on the junction of the Bathline and the Kreekrakdam. Both the road and the railroad were seriously damaged. Two of the army barracks were destroyed, and the local waterworks and telephone lines were temporarily disabled. Dutch soldiers soon repaired the damage.

During the day, the Dutch army in the south, which was in retreat after their defenses at the Peel-Raamline had been broken, reestablished their positions in the area of Bergen op Zoom.

=== 12 May ===
The port of Vlissingen was again targeted by the Germans in the early morning. As before, the bombers operated in so-called "Ketten", (a formation of three aircraft). Witnesses spoke of at least twenty bombers in many waves, so it was likely that at least two squadrons operated over Vlissingen during this raid, possibly three. The Allied ships in the port immediately opened fire on the German aircraft, as did Dutch and French AA guns. French aircraft began to get into the air. Four ships were sunk by direct hits. Much of the harbor and infrastructure was hit by bombs. Cranes, offloading systems, storage buildings and the office of the local ferry line were destroyed or damaged. The railroad station was hit several times. Most houses in the harbor quarter did not have any windows left intact and torn-off roof tiles were all over the place. Other houses and a church well away from the harbor were destroyed or badly damaged. Five civilians were killed during the raid.

The Dutch troops at the Bathline witnessed an ever-growing flood of retreating Dutch soldiers that had once been the defending forces in the eastern part of North Brabant. The French supreme command had meanwhile realised that the operational plan for the 7th Army could not be executed as envisaged. The German advance through North Brabant prevented the French from forming a firm and well prepared screen around Antwerp, on Dutch soil. Moreover, the Belgian first defense line along the Albert Canal had also given in under the pressure of two tank divisions and overwhelming air assaults. The Belgian army would soon retreat to the Dyle-line.

=== 13 May ===
In the southwest, the Germans had almost reached Zeeland. In the Bathline, which was the closest to North Brabant, the fourth day introduced the men to the rumbling sound of the ground war. The sound of German heavy artillery that would eventually reach Moerdijk caused the men of the Bathline to realize that their future opponents were closing in on their position. Frequent patrols were carried out; there was rising tension in the lines. A squad of railroad troops was given orders to destroy the track that crossed the Bathline. These were the same men that had worked to repair this same stretch of line after German bombs had damaged it a few days before.

German fighters attacked the Dutch airbase at Vlissingen, but an even bigger threat revealed itself. In the course of the day, panic broke out amongst the men when a rumor spread that German troops had reached the island and were heading for Vlissingen. People suddenly saw light signals from houses and secret marks were read from laundry that was waving on drying-lines. It wasn't until the evening that these rumors lost their effect.

The Luftwaffe was less active on the 13th over Zeeland. This was mostly due to the fact that many squadrons were assigned to the fierce battle that was raging around the island of Dordrecht. The bombers that had been active over Zeeland, were now raiding Dutch artillery and infantry positions in the south-front of "Fortress Holland". Direct support was also given to the tanks of the 9th Tank Division that were engaged on Dordrecht island.

During this time, the morale of the troops—particularly the Dutch—had begun to drop. More and more Dutch troops were retreating from the east, and Queen Wilhelmina had fled to Britain (although she did it unwillingly).

=== 14 May ===
At Bergen op Zoom, units of the 12th were surrounded by two companies of a SS battalion. The French retreated from Woensdrecht, sealing the fate of their comrades at Bergen op Zoom. They left many tanks and supplies behind.

A Dutch force of about 200 men had taken control of the forest south of Bergen op Zoom, however they were forced to retreat when the French troops in the surrounding area were ordered to fall back. The French launched a counter-attack at Huijbergen. They had armoured cars and Hotchkiss H35 light tanks available, but lost five Panhard 178 armoured cars and 200 men as prisoners. The Germans pushed on, taking hundreds more French and Dutch prisoners.

The occupants of the casement did not join the almost general retreat of the infantry. They stayed in their concrete and steel posts and it was due to their efforts that the Bathline did not fall immediately. When German patrols probed the line, they were met by fierce machine gun fire from the Dutch strongholds and this was enough to deny the SS men any further access to the line. During the evening, the German artillery fire gradually decreased in intensity and it eventually stopped. With the exception of a few sections in the central sector and the casement-crews, the Bathline had been deserted.

The Dutch army laid down their arms at 19:00, except for the armed forces on Zeeland. The formal capitulation agreement was signed the next day.

=== 15 May ===
In the late evening of the 14th, the Germans prepared a battle-plan for an assault against the remaining occupied sections of the Bathline. They planned to first send in a negotiator. A message was dictated in which the Germans demanded immediate and unconditional surrender of the line, or else the Germans would unleash an unprecedented assault. The threat was more of an attempt to trick the defenders, since the Germans did not have the resources for such a massive assault. The Dutch had withdrawn from the line during the night.

Early in the morning the men of the SS Deutschland Regiment cautiously approached the Bathline; when they found the trenches and fox-holes empty, they hurried through. A few Dutch defenders—who had not become aware of the retreat—were taken prisoner.

The Zanddijkline was the main defense line of the capital islands of Zeeland. Three casements at the sluice-complex in the south, and two casements on each side of the railroad bed were the only concrete positions. The balance of the line was formed by earth and timber reinforced constructions and trenches. Some minefields had been laid at certain strategic locations along the approaches.

The Germans soon began their assault on the Zanddijkline. As they approached, they came under Dutch machine gun fire. This resulted in many men diving down a slope and landing in the minefields that had been prepared just days before. Numerous detonations killed about 16 SS men. Pioneers were called forward and under cover of German machine guns they cleared the area of mines. After this hold-up, the signal to reassume the assault was given. Some four German batteries started pounding the Dutch line, especially around both sides of the Tholseindsedijk.

The Germans once again attacked the line, this time with air support. The Dutch naval artillery continued shelling their perimeter, forcing the Germans to keep their noses to the ground until the artillery gradually decreased its fire. It was enough time for the Dutch to evacuate their troops in the northern sector and cross the bridge over the Postbrug canal.

The only sector of the Zanddijkline that was not evacuated right away was the southern part. Here, the remaining battalion was spared the attention of the Luftwaffe. However, within a few hours they were forced to retreat as well.

==== Tholen ====
Tholen, a natural island, formerly part of the North Brabant territory, was separated from the mainland by the Eendracht, a shallow and muddy natural waterway. The de facto capital on the island was a small town, also named Tholen, which had the only connection with the North Brabant mainland. The entire occupation of the island—which needed a little more than two companies—was concentrated along the Eendracht.

During the day, a German patrol approached, but was quickly driven off by Dutch machine-gun fire. As a result, a German negotiator came out and demanded the surrender of the island; the Dutch commander refused. Soon afterward, German field artillery and mortars opened fire on the defenders. Other than a direct hit on a gas storage tank, little damage was inflicted by the German guns. The German infantry began to advance. The Dutch let them approach until they were close to a road-barrier; then mortars and machine guns opened fire, devastating the attackers. The Germans suffered heavy casualties, some men jumped into near-by pools of water to escape the shooting. The Germans were forced to retreat. Their reports spoke of 20 men KIA. The Dutch defenders suffered two losses.

After realizing that they could not hold their positions much longer, the Dutch retreated further onto the island during the night.

=== 16 May ===
The SS units had halted at the canal through Zuid-Beveland after they had crossed the two defense-lines on the 15th. During the night, soldiers on rafts were able to cross the canal. The two French battalions that defended the canal—no more than 1,250 men—were forced to defend a front of 9 km (5.6 mi). The canal had a width of 50–90 m (160–300 ft), and as such, it formed a considerable obstacle for any attacker. Since all the bridges had been destroyed, an assault crossing had to be executed by making use of rafts or boats. The Luftwaffe continued its morale-sapping presence, forcing considerable numbers of French soldiers to flee their positions along the canal. The French defenders had requested fire-missions against the sectors where the Germans deployed. The French feared the lack of precision of their own artillery, many company commanders ordered their units a few hundred meters back from their positions along the canal.

Soon afterward, the entire French occupation of the canal defensive area in the northern sector gave way, resulting in a desperate dash for safety. At one location close to the Postbrug, a squad of French colonial soldiers held out, but a storm-troop was quickly organized and this position was soon abandoned. Meanwhile, the Germans had managed to repair the northernmost river crossing. Some light armored cars and motorcycles were able to cross at this point and these units chased after the fleeing French. These motorized units reached the Sloedam early in the evening, but avoided contact.

The majority of Dutch units around Goes had managed to cross the Sloedam or had taken the ferry to Noord-Beveland before the evening, many French units had been cut off. The Luftwaffe had driven off all Allied planes in the region, giving them free rein over the retreating defenders.

==== Tholen ====
In the morning, the Germans again sent a negotiator to try to convince the Dutch to surrender. And again the Dutch rejected the offer. Two hours later, German artillery opened fire on the Dutch positions. During the barrage, a Dutch battalion commander contacted the TC in Middelburg and asked for instructions. Henrik Van der Stad—the Dutch commander—complimented him on the resistance his forces had shown the previous day and stated that the troops were to be allowed to evacuate the island and reinforce the island of Schouwen-Duiveland.

Later that day, Schouwen-Duiveland was assaulted by the Germans. The Dutch commander, as soon as his troops were attacked, gave orders to retreat, leaving the entire coastline open to the Germans.

=== 17 May ===
The Sloedam was a strategic point on Walcheren island. Some mud flats on both sides of the 'dam' made it possible for light infantry to cross the Sloe, but it was a tricky business, some parts were very swampy and one could easily sink and drown.

The French had considered sending more troops to Walcheren, but they did not. The defense of the Sloedam was considered to be the last bit of useful resistance. Should that position fall, a general retreat of the French troops would become inevitable. Since the objective of safeguarding Antwerp and the Scheld canal had not been achieved, the battles that continued at Zuid-Beveland and Walcheren had only one objective; to cover the north flank of the French forces north of Antwerp.

Early that morning, the Germans opened fire with their medium and heavy howitzers, which were all positioned near Lewedorp. The French artillery and the joint Allied navy units replied with a heavy barrage on the first German troops. The assault stalled immediately and for the first time in the Zeeland campaign the Germans faltered and withdrew, leaving a considerable number of dead and wounded behind. The Dutch offered their assistance, but the French Commander declined the offer. The Germans then launched a massive assault onto the French defenses, by the end of the day Walcheren lay open to the SS.

The Germans then turned their attention on Vlissingen. They began to advance toward the city, they did not meet any resistance until they were at the outskirts. Many Dutch and French troops began to evacuate; however, the French commander—General Deslaurens—gathered the remaining troops and set up defensive positions. They were soon pushed back, and Deslaurens was killed. He would be the only general to die on Dutch soil in May 1940. During the night, the last pockets of resistance were cleared by the Germans. Here and there Dutch and French troops put up a brief fight, but before morning all resistance had faded away. The remaining troops on Walcheren—mostly Dutch—had surrendered.

==== Bombing of Middelburg ====
On 17 May, the Germans launched a massive raid on Middelburg, which would only to be surpassed for severity by the Rotterdam Blitz. Nearly 600 buildings were destroyed by the bombing and resulting fire. 800 people were made homeless.

The Dutch press—one of the first official sources that had been "Nazified"—reported the devastation of Middelburg later that month and in early June. The massive fires in the town would continue to grow until the evening of 18 May, when about 500 fire-fighters and volunteers, managed to control the fires and prevent further destruction. The last of the fires were not extinguished until some 40 days after the raid.

=== Surrender ===
By late afternoon on 17 May, it was clear that the Germans had conquered the whole of Zeeland apart from Zeelandic Flanders. The battle around the Sloedam was still raging, but Dutch units in western Walcheren were inquiring at the Dutch staff office whether or not capitulation was feasible. When many local commanders failed to reach the staff, which was indeed hard to do, especially due to the ongoing bombardment of Middelburg, local capitulation initiatives soon developed.

Van der Stad was repeatedly queried by his officers and the mayor of Middelburg about when the capitulation of Walcheren would be offered to the Germans. He made it perfectly clear that this could never be the case as long as French troops were still fighting the Germans.

Late in the evening, a radio transmission was broadcast stating that Dutch forces in Walcheren and Zuid-Beveland would surrender. Half an hour later, Lieutenant-Colonel Karel himself went to the road east of Middelburg along which German troops were heading southward. He was transported to a hotel near Vlissingen, close to the sluices, where he officially informed SS-Standartenführer Steiner—commander of the SS Regiment—of the capitulation of the Dutch forces on Walcheren and Zuid-Beveland.

Noord-Beveland was officially not part of the armistice, but on the morning of the 18th a German officer was sent over under a flag of truce, he brought the news of the Dutch surrender elsewhere. Upon this news the Dutch forces—isolated from all the rest—surrendered as well.

== Aftermath ==
=== The Dutch Navy ===
The majority of the Dutch naval forces had been evacuated by the 14th. The few ships that remained were either captured, or sailed to Britain. The ships that reached Britain would later go on to defend the Dutch East Indies after that colony was invaded by the Japanese.

=== Casualties ===
The Dutch lost 38 men, five of whom were officers. Their French allies fared the worst, with 229 killed in action. Their German opponents suffered 97 dead. British losses over Zeeland are unknown.

== See also ==
- List of Dutch military equipment of World War II
- List of French military equipment of World War II
- List of German military equipment of World War II
- List of British military equipment of World War II
