= Joachim von Busse =

World War I flying ace

- Born: 14 May 1893; Latkovo
- Died: 21 January 1945 (aged 51); Insterburg
- Military career
- Allegiance: Germany
- Branch: Infantry; aviation
- Rank: Leutnant
- Unit: Jasta 3
- Commands: Jasta 20
- Awards: Royal House Order of Hohenzollern, Iron Cross First Class

Leutnant Joachim von Busse (born 14 May 1893, son of Hugo von Busse and Elly von Kunkel; death 21 January 1945) was a World War I flying ace credited with eleven aerial victories.

== Early life and infantry service ==
Joachim von Busse was born in Latkovo, Hohensalzen on 14 May 1893. His parents were Elly von Kunkel and Hugo von Busse. Busse joined the King's Jager Regiment No. 1 in May 1912.

== World War I aviation service ==
Busse transferred to aviation in March 1915. He served with an artillery cooperation unit, FFA 12, before transferring to Kasta 22. His next assignment took him to single-seater fighters in Jagdstaffel 3, in August 1917. He promptly scored his first win on the 10th. He scored three more victories with his Albatros D.III, with the last one being Canadian ace Emerson Smith, before being given command of Jagdstaffel 20 on 1 December. He shot down enemy aircraft three more times, in July 1918, before being wounded on 1 August. After another victory on 24 September, he finished his tally by scoring three Victories on 3 October 1918.
