= Jagdstaffel 8 =

Jasta 8
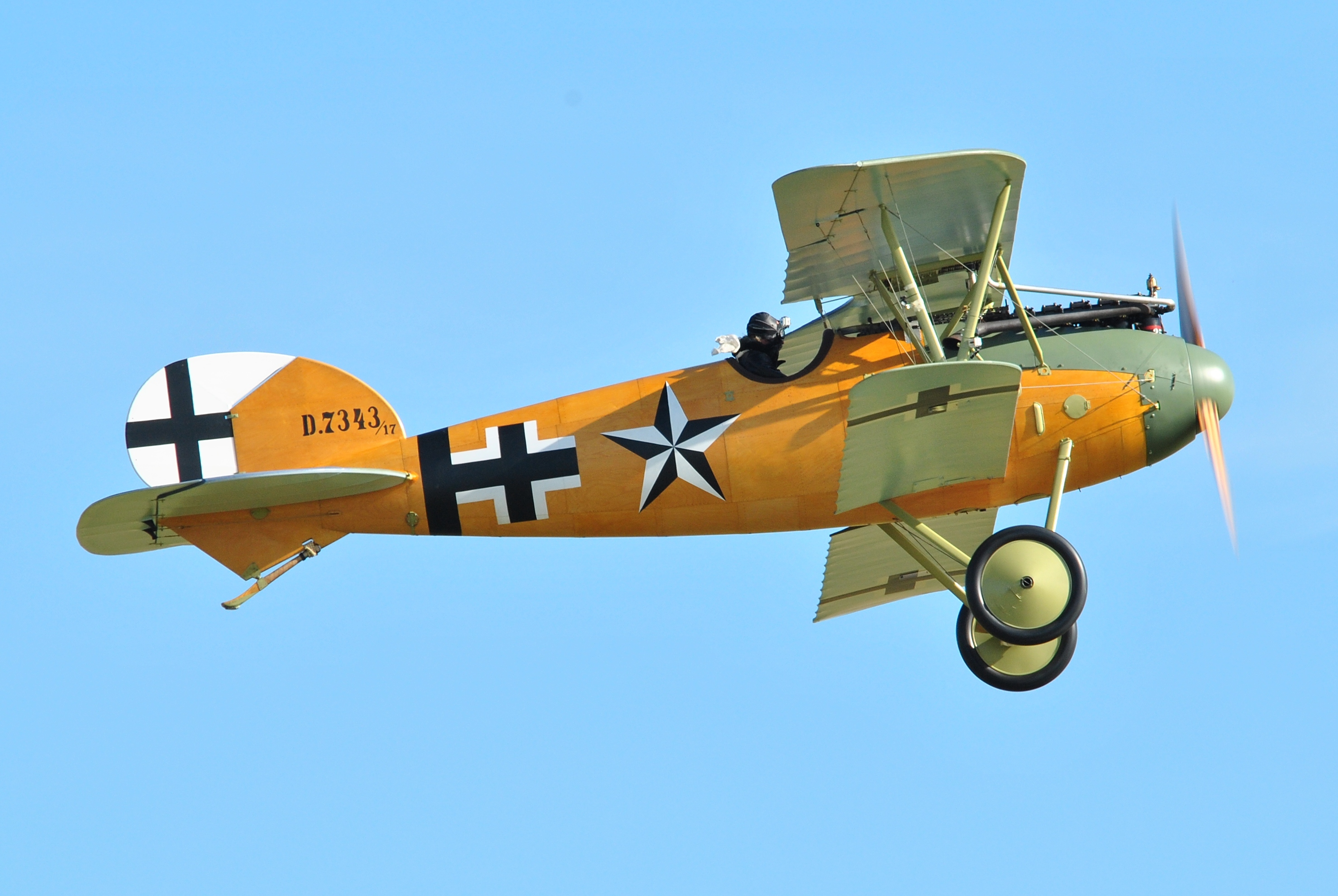
- Albatross D.V
- Active: 1916–1918
- Country: German Empire
- Branch: Luftstreitkräfte
- Type: Fighter squadron
- Engagements: World War I

Royal Prussian Jagdstaffel 8 was a fighter squadron of the Luftstreitkräfte, the air arm of the Imperial German Army during World War I. Although the Jasta went out of existence along with its parent units shortly after the Armistice ending World War I, its experiences would strongly influence the subsequent Luftwaffe.

== History ==
The basis of Jagdstaffel 8 was a small element of single-seat fighters attached to Feldflieger Abteilung 6 at Roulers Aerodrome. It was transferred to FEA 10 at Böblingen for the formation of the new unit on 10 September 1916. The squadron served beyond the Armistice, not disbanding until 3 December 1918. It passed into history at FEA 11, Breslau-Gandau. During its 27-month existence, the squadron scored at least 91 confirmed victories. In turn, it had paid the cost of four pilots killed in action, one killed in a flying accident, and eight wounded in action (two multiply).

== Commanding officers (Staffelführer) ==
1. Gustav Stenzel: 23 September 1916 – 28 July 1917 (KIA)
2. Konrad Mettlich (Acting): 28 July 1917 – 9 August 1917
3. Constantin von Bentheim: 9 August 1917 – 1 April 1918
4. Werner Junck : 1 April 1918 – 6 July 1918 (WIA)
5. Joachim de la Camp: 6 July 1918 – 12 August 1918
6. Werner Junck: 12 August 1918 – 11 November 1918

== Duty stations (airfields) ==
1. Rumbeke, Belgium: 12 September 1916 – 30 September 1917
2. Jabbeke, Bruges, Belgium: 30 September 1917 – 19 November 1917
3. Neuvilly, Le Cateau, France: 20 November 1917 – 14 December 1917
4. Wassigny, France: 15 December 1917 – 21 March 1918
5. Bohain-en-Vermandois, France: 21 March 1918 – 24 March 1918
6. Beauvois, France: 24 March 1918 – 27 March 1918
7. Balâtre-Roye: 27 March 1918 – 5 July 1918
8. Saint-Rémy, France: 6 July 1918 – 14 September 1918
9. Mercy-le-Haut: 15 September 1918 – 11 November 1918

== Personnel ==
The Jasta was a formative experience for a young ace who went on to be a Luftwaffe Generalleutnant, Werner Junck. Among its seven other aces were four other notable ones; Walter Göttsch, Rudolf Francke, Wilhelm Seitz, and Rudolf Wendelmuth.

== Aircraft and operations ==
Details of aircraft assigned are sketchy; the only type they are known to have operated were Albatros D.Vs, which were introduced in 1917.

Squadron operations are not any better known for the squadron's first year, except it was based at Rumbeke, Belgium. During the summer of 1917, Jasta 8 became part of Jagdgruppe 15 — aka Jagdgruppe Nord. Jasta 8 suffered a stutter in leadership during this summer; on 28 July, Staffelführer Gustav Stenzel was killed in action. Oberleutnant Konrad Mettlich assumed command until Constantin von Bentheim arrived on 9 August. The Jasta moved from Rumbeke to Jabbeke-Brügge on 30 September 1917, shifting to support of 4 Armee. In early December, it also became part of Jagdgruppe "Etreux", an ad hoc unit consisting of the Jasta and Jasta 35; the Jagdgruppe was commanded by Constantin von Bentheim. On 14 December, the Jasta moved again, to Neuvilly, and to support of the 2 Armee. It moved once more that year, on 15 December, and began a three-month stay at Wassigny.

When the Germans launched their Spring Offensive in March 1918, the Jasta uprooted three times, operating on the front of the 18 Armee. After three day stays at both Bohain and Beauvois, it settled into Balâtre-Roye on 27 March 1918 for a hundred-day occupation. At some time in March, Jasta 8 was also incorporated into Jagdgruppe 1. The Jasta acquired a new commanding officer on 4 April 1918 in future Generalmajor Werner Junck; their previous Staffelführer, Constantin von Bentheim, had been appointed to command of Jagdgruppe 15 three days previously. As part of Jagdgruppe 1, Jasta 8 supported, successively, 1 Armee and 5 Armee. On 6 July, it moved to St. Rémy, and on 15 September settled at Mercy-le-Haut. It ended the war there.
