= James Dennis Payne =

British WWI flying ace (1896–??)

- Born: 22 July 1896; Leamington, Warwickshire, England
- Military career
- Allegiance: England
- Branch: Aviation
- Rank: Captain
- Units: No. 41 Squadron RFC, No. 29 Squadron RFC
- Awards: Military Cross

Captain James Dennis Payne MC was a World War I flying ace credited with fourteen aerial victories.

== Early life ==
Payne was born in Leamington Spa on 22 July 1896, the son of Edward Dennis and Annie Payne, his father was a policeman. In 1911 he was described as an auctioneers clerk aged 14.

== World War I service ==
On 10 July 1915 Sergeant Payne was awarded flight certificate No. 1415 on Maurice Farman Biplane from the Military School in Birmingham. He was originally assigned to No. 41 Squadron RFC on 12 June 1916, but was shipped out on 16 July, joining No. 29 Squadron RFC on 6 August. On 30 October 1916, Acting Sergeant Major Payne was commissioned a second lieutenant on duty with the Royal Flying Corps.

He scored his first victory on 12 August 1917, using a Nieuport fighter to destroy a German Albatros D.V near Houthoulst Forest. His string of triumphs would run until 9 January 1918. During November 1917, three notable events would occur. On the 9th, he would wound and drive down veteran ace Walter Göttsch for victory number nine. On the 17th, he was awarded the Military Cross. Also in November he was appointed a Flight Commander, which bore the concomitant rank of captain.

By the time he was done, on 9 January 1918, he had destroyed four enemy planes and driven down ten out of control; ten of his victories were over Albatros D.V fighters. All of his victories were scored while flying a Nieuport. On 10 January 1918, he was withdrawn to Home Establishment.

== Post World War I ==
Postwar, Payne made a living for a while by barnstorming. After that, he lived in Belgium.

== Honours and awards ==
Military Cross (MC)

2nd Lt. James Dennis Payne, Gen. List, and R.F.C.

For conspicuous gallantry and devotion to duty. While on patrol with two other scouts he attacked a formation of seven enemy two-seaters, bringing down two himself while the two scouts brought down two more. Besides these, he has accounted for five other machines, and at all times shown the greatest gallantry.

== Bibliography ==
- Franks, Norman (2000). Nieuport Aces of World War I. Oxford, UK: Osprey Publishing. ISBN 978-1-85532-961-4.
- Shores, Christopher F.; Franks, Norman & Guest, Russell F. (1990). Above the Trenches: a Complete Record of the Fighter Aces and Units of the British Empire Air Forces 1915–1920. London, UK: Grub Street. ISBN 978-0-948817-19-9.
