= Rudolf Francke =

German World War I flying ace

- Vzfw Rudolf Francke (right) with Vzfw Wilhelm Seitz (left), 1917.
- Born: Unknown
- Died: Unknown
- Military career
- Allegiance: Germany
- Branch: Aviation
- Rank: Leutnant
- Units: Schutzstaffel 17, Jasta 2, Jasta 8
- Awards: Military Merit Cross

Leutnant Rudolf Francke was a German World War I flying ace credited with 15 aerial victories.

Francke joined the German Air Service in 1914. He served with Kampfstaffel 41 (Tactical Bomber Squadron 41) until July 1916. The following month he became a pilot. When Kasta 41 became Schutzstaffel 17 (Protection Squadron 17) on 1 January 1917, he continued to fly with it. He was promoted to Vizefeldwebel on 23 March 1917 and briefly transferred to Jasta 2. After his posting to Jagdstaffel 8 (Fighter Squadron 8), he was awarded the Golden Military Merit Cross on 16 May. He scored his first victory on 3 June 1917. By 23 August 1918, he was officially credited with 14 victories, all scored in service with Jasta 8. A 15th claim, scored on 26 September 1918, was not made official although he is shown with 15 kills in Jagdstaffel 8's records. Rudolf Francke was commissioned toward the end of his service, and survived the war.
