= Fritz Otto Bernert =

Otto Bernert
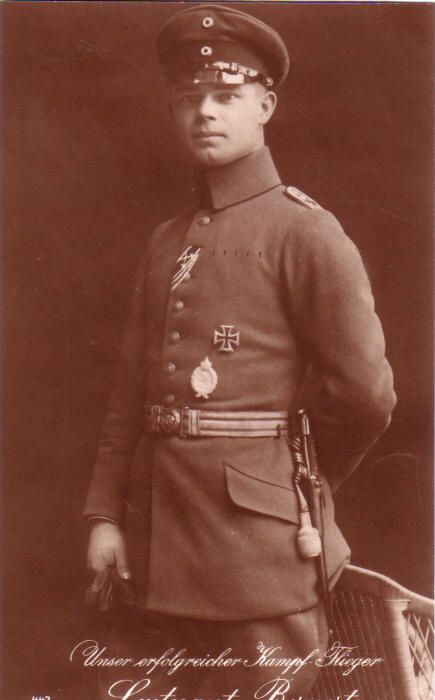
- Note that Bernert is hiding his disabled arm.
- Born: 6 March 1893; Ratibor, Upper Silesia German Empire (modern Raciborz, Poland)
- Died: 18 October 1918 (aged 25); Ratibor, Upper Silesia
- Burial place: Ratibor, Upper Silesia
- Military career
- Allegiance: German Empire
- Branch: Infantry, Air Service
- Service years: 1912–1918
- Rank: Oberleutnant
- Units: 173rd Infantry Regiment; Flieger-Abteilung 27; Flieger-Abteilung 71; Kampfeinsitzerkommando Vaux; Jagdstaffel 4; Jagdstaffel 2
- Commands: Jagdstaffel 6; Jagdstaffel 2
- Awards: Pour le Merite; Albert Order, Knight 2nd Class with Swords; Knight's Cross of the Royal House Order of Hohenzollern with Swords; Iron Cross Second and First Class

Oberleutnant Fritz Otto Bernert (commonly called Otto) (6 March 1893 – 18 October 1918) was a leading German fighter ace of World War I. After being invalided from infantry duty after his fourth wound, Bernert joined the aviation branch. After pilot training, he scored 27 victories between 17 April 1916 and 7 May 1917 despite being essentially one-armed and wearing pince-nez. Among his 15 victories during Bloody April were five scored in 20 minutes on 13 April 1917. He was promoted to squadron command, first of Jagdstaffel 6, then of Jagdstaffel 2. Removed from command on 18 August 1918 by wounds and illness, he died of influenza on 18 October 1918.

== Early life and infantry service ==
Fritz Otto Bernert was the son of a Bürgermeister (mayor). He was born in Ratibor, Silesia, which now is Racibórz, Poland. At the time of his birth, Ratibor was German and part of the Kingdom of Prussia.

Bernert was commissioned into the 173rd Infantry Regiment in 1912. He was serving with them when World War I began. He was wounded in ground combat in both November and December 1914; his fourth wound, inflicted by a bayonet, severed the major nerve in his left arm. Upon recovery, it became apparent his left arm was essentially useless, and he was invalided out of the infantry.

== Aerial service ==
Bernert then applied to the Luftstreitkräfte and trained to be an aerial observer. Upon graduation, he flew reconnaissance missions for Feldflieger Abteilung 27. He then transferred to Feldflieger Abteilung 71, where he served through November. Bernert then applied for pilot's training; he hid his disability successfully and was accepted. The fact that he wore pince-nez also did not bar him from service.

He transferred to Kampfeinsitzerkommando Metz, a temporary grouping of pilots mostly from Feldflieger Abteilung 71, for his initial assignment to a fighter unit. By March, 1916, he had his pilot's license and was assigned to Kampfeinsitzerkommando Vaux. On 17 April 1916, he scored his first victory while flying a Fokker Eindecker, over a Nieuport fighter.

The ad hoc Kampfeinsitzerkommando Vaux was equipped with Halberstadt D.II planes and reorganized into a full-fledged permanent Prussian fighter squadron. It became Jagdstaffel 4 on 25 August 1916. On 6 September, Bernert scored the new squadron's first victory. He became an ace on 9 November 1916, scoring his fifth, sixth, and seventh triumphs.

On 1 March 1917, he was transferred to Jagdstaffel 2. This squadron, named in honor of Oswald Boelcke, the founder of fighter aviation tactics and strategy, was considered the premier unit of the German Air Service. Bernert scored his first victory in this unit on 19 March; on 1 April, he achieved the status of double ace with his tenth win.

Bernert continued to shoot down British airplanes during early April 1917. He claimed his 18th and 19th victims on the 11th. Then, rather unusually, he was awarded the Pour le Merite on either 23 or 24 April 1917. (Note: Customarily, the Pour le Merite was recommended as an award after 20 confirmed victories. Bernert's award was granted only 12 days after his 19th victory, and he may have been recommended for an even lower number, given administrative processing time.) However, it was on the 24th that he carried off one of the notable aerial feats of the war. On a morning patrol, Bernert managed to shoot one of an enemy patrol of Sopwith 1½ Strutters at 0830 hours, killing the pilot and burning the aircraft. Breaking off combat with the Sopwiths, Bernert next found a formation of Royal Aircraft Factory B.E.2es. The three bombers were flying without aerial observers manning their rear guns; their gunners had been left home so more bombs could be loaded. Slower than Bernert's fighter, with no rear defense, they were easy prey for him, and he blasted them from the sky between 0840 and 0845. Two of the unfortunate British pilots were killed, and the third captured after his crash. Then, with fuel and ammunition remaining, Bernert found an Airco DH.4 and shot it down at 0850 hours, killing the observer and wounding the pilot.

Five victories on a single mission was astounding. It had only happened once before, when the bomber crew of Austro-Hungarian aces Julius Arigi and Johann Lasi shot down five Italian assailants on 22 October 1916.

== Bernert in command ==
On 1 May, Bernert was appointed to command Jagdstaffel 6. His final three victories came in May, with an unconfirmed 28th on 19 May. (Note: Interestingly, these victories scored while flying with Jagdstaffel 6 were credited to Jagdstaffel 2.) In mid-May, Bernert crashlanded behind German lines after his engine quit in mid-combat. A few days later, he landed long, ran out of airfield, and crashed next to his home aerodrome, breaking his jaw and bruising himself severely. Although unable to fly, Bernert did not give up his command.

On 9 June 1917, Bernert was transferred back to Jasta 2, and would command it to the end of his flying career. The previous commanding officer had scored no victories to inspire his pilots; as it turned out, because of his injuries, Bernert could do no better. However, he hosted a delegation of pilots from neutral Sweden. He also welcomed several pilots from Austro-Hungary during his tenure, including Raoul Stojsavljevic, and thus influenced the fighter tactics of Germany's allies. He also took some leave during June and July.

Bernert was severely wounded again on 18 August 1917. This wound was the final straw that took him off flight status and removed him from command. On the 28th, he was transferred to aid the Inspector of the Flying Service. However, he actually spent three months in hospital. He was seriously ill in addition to his wounds. He was also diagnosed with Kriegsmudigkeit (war weariness).

He was promoted to Oberleutnant upon his release from hospital. However, in May 1918, he was back in hospital at a sanitarium, probably with lung problems. As the Spanish flu swept through the German populace, Bernert caught it. He died from influenza in his home town's hospital, on 18 October 1918.

== Decorations and awards ==
- Iron Cross (1914), 1st and 2nd class
- Albert Order, Knight 2nd Class with Swords
- Knight's Cross of the Royal House Order of Hohenzollern with Swords
- Pour le Mérite
