= Joachim von Amsberg (general) =

Joachim von Amsberg (26 August 1869 in Schwerin – 5 September 1945 in Rostock) was a German general, aristocrat and a member of the House of Amsberg.

== Biography ==
Born as the youngest son of Gabriel Ludwig Johann von Amsberg (1822–1899) and his wife, Marie Friederike Charlotte von Passow (1831–1904). He joined the Grand Ducal Mecklenburgian Grenadier Regiment No. 89 in 1890, and saw service during the First World War and the Weimar Republic era, being promoted to major-general in 1924 and General der Infanterie upon his retirement in 1929.

== Marriage and issue ==
On 19 January 1907 he married Countess Therese Amelie Eleonore Irmgard von Bothmer (1881–1949). They had three sons and a daughter:

- Erich von Amsberg (1908-1980)
- Jürgen von Amsberg (1910-1943)
- Ursula von Amsberg (1912-1997)
- Friedrich-Joachim von Amsberg (1914-1964)

== Decorations and awards ==
- Order of the Red Eagle, 4th class with Crown (Prussia)
- Knight's Cross of the Royal House Order of Hohenzollern
- Iron Cross of 1914, 1st and 2nd class
- Service Award (Prussia)
- Military Merit Order, 3rd class with Swords and Crown (Bavaria)
- Knight's Cross, First Class of the Albert Order with Swords and Crown (Saxony)
- Knight's Cross, First Class of the Order of the Zähringer Lion with Swords (Baden)
- Knight's Cross of the Order of the Griffon with Crown (Mecklenburg)
- Military Merit Cross, 1st class (Mecklenburg-Schwerin)
- Knight's Cross, First Class of the Order of Henry the Lion (Brunswick)
- Honorary Knight's Cross, First Class of the House and Merit Order of Peter Frederick Louis (Oldenburg)
- Friedrich August Cross, 1st class (Oldenburg)
- Cross for Merit in War (Saxe-Meiningen)
- Honour Cross, 2nd class with Crown (Reuss)
- War Merit Cross (Lippe)
- Military Merit Cross, 3rd class with War Decoration (Austria-Hungary)
- Silver Liakat Medal with swords (Ottoman Empire)
- Ottoman War Medal (Turkish: Harp Madalyası), better known as the "Gallipoli Star" or "Iron Crescent"
