= Franz Hemer =

World War I flying ace

- In front of his Fokker
- Born: 6 June 1894; Pfeddersheim, Worms, Grand Duchy of Hesse
- Died: 18 October 1982 (aged 88); Frankfurt am Main, Germany
- Military career
- Allegiance: Germany
- Branch: Aviation
- Rank: Leutnant
- Nickname: "Locken"
- Units: Flieger-Abteilung (Artillerie) (Flying Detachment (Artillery)) 283; Jagdstaffel 6 (Fighter Squadron 6)
- Awards: Royal House Order of Hohenzollern; Iron Cross, 1st and 2nd Class; General Honor Decoration (Hesse)

Leutnant Franz Hemer was a World War I German flying ace credited with 18 aerial victories.

== Biography ==
Hemer was originally a talented concert cellist. His long curly blonde hair sparked his nickname of "Locken".

Hemer served with Flieger-Abteilung (Artillerie) 283 before he was posted to Jagdstaffel (Jasta) 6 on 10 September 1917. He scored his first victory on 27 October 1917, when he shot down an RE.8. He scored once more in 1917, on 12 November. He was then assigned a Fokker Dr. 1. He had a wavy yellow line painted the length of the fuselage, symbolizing the wavy locks of hair that gave him the nickname "Locken".

By the end of March 1918, he became an ace. He scored at least five more victories with the triplane before upgrading to a Fokker D.VII. He scored his last victory on 8 August 1918. The following day, he was wounded in action when his Fokker D.VII was shot down during a dogfight with RAF DH.9s of No. 49 Squadron RAF supported by Sopwith Camels. While convalescing, he was commissioned a Leutnant. However, he apparently did not return to flight duty before the war's end.

Later he became managing Director of König & Bruder in Leipzig, head office in Vienna, an old fur trading company.

Franz Hemer died on 18 October 1982 in Frankfurt.

== Sources ==
- Above the Lines: The Aces and Fighter Units of the German Air Service, Naval Air Service and Flanders Marine Corps 1914 - 1918. Norman L. R. Franks, et al. Grub Street, 1993. ISBN 978-0-948817-73-1.
- O'Connor, Neal W. (2002). Aviation Awards of Imperial Germany and the Men Who Earned Them, Volume VII. Princeton, New Jersey: Schiffer Publishing Ltd. ISBN 0-7643-1626-5.
