= Ruth Rhoads Lepper Gardner =

Known for creating detailed maps of the coast of Maine

- Born: Ruth Rhoads Lepper; June 27, 1905; Norwood, Massachusetts
- Died: April 16, 2011 (aged 105); Cove's Edge, Damariscotta, Maine
- Other names: Marion Annette Armstrong
- Education: Norwood High School, Pembroke College of Brown University (Providence, RI), Rhode Island School of Design, Museum of Fine Arts in Boston
- Known for: Creating illustrated maps of the coast of Maine and working as a cartographer for the US Navy
- Spouse: Cornelius Gardner
- Parents: George Lepper (father); Louisa Lepper (mother)
- Relatives: Annie L. Cox (aunt)

Ruth Rhoads Lepper Gardner (1905 – 2011) was an artist and mapmaker who published illustrated maps of the coast of Maine. She developed an interest in mapmaking while working as a draftsman for the US Navy during World War II.

== Personal life ==
Gardner was the eldest of three children born to George and Louisa Lepper in Norwood, Massachusetts. Her father was a machinist and one of the early Ford dealers in Massachusetts, and also operated a bicycle shop with her mother. Many of her friends and relatives called her "Red" because of her hair and personality.

She eventually became a young apprentice to her aunt, Annie L. Cox and traveled the world expanding on her own artistic skills and experiences. Living briefly in Greenwich Village, New York, she enjoyed a bohemian lifestyle. She worked at Macy's and occasionally posed as a model for local artists.

On July 4, 1942, she married Cornelius Gardner who was a commanding officer in the US Navy in WWI. They met while Gardner was working for the US Navy as a draftsman. They eventually settled in Maine where Gardner became known as a local artist and personality. She died on April 16, 2011, at 105 years old.

== Career ==
Gardner obtained a degree in art from the Rhode Island School of Design, and also went to museum school at the Museum of Fine Arts in Boston. But it was during her employment by the US Navy that Gardner became highly skilled at illustrating and creating highly stylized maps. The maps that she created focused on the history and marine life centered around Maine. During her career, she produced dozens of maps of the coast. She frequently traveled on tugboats with the Maine Coast Mission to gather research.

Her artistic medium of focus was pen and ink illustrations and watercolor, and she also played the cello.

On May 15, 2004, Gardner received a Distinguished Achievement Award from the University of Southern Maine.

== Awards ==
- Distinguished Achievement Award (2004) from the University of Southern Maine

== Publications ==
- Boothbay Region Sketch Book (1952)
- Main Coast Picture Book (1970), published by Bond Wheelwright Company/Freeport, ME

== Map Publications ==
- Map of Western, Central, and Eastern Maine (1952)
- Pictorial Map of Southern Maine (1952)
- Mid-Coast Maine (1979), color lithograph, 37 x 54 cm, OML Collections
- The Maine Coast from Kittery to Cape Elizabeth (1977), Color lithograph, 53 x 39 cm, OML Collections
- The Maine Coast: A Map of Casco Bay (1960), color lithography, 53 x 39 cm, OML Collections

== Illustrations ==
Gardner illustrated for a variety of books and publications.

- Parables from the Sea (2011) by Robbins Wolcoot Barstow, published by Literary Licensing, LLC
- Anchor to Windward (1940) by Edwin Valentine Mitchel, published by Coward-McCann; NY

== Notable Works on Gardner ==
- “Auntie of the Imagination.” Written by nephew, George S. Workman, courtesy Boothbay Register, July 25, 2013.
- The Art and Cartography of Ruth Lepper Gardner [Interactive Map]
