= Medal for Merit in War =

Medal for Merit in War Medaille für Verdienste im Kriege
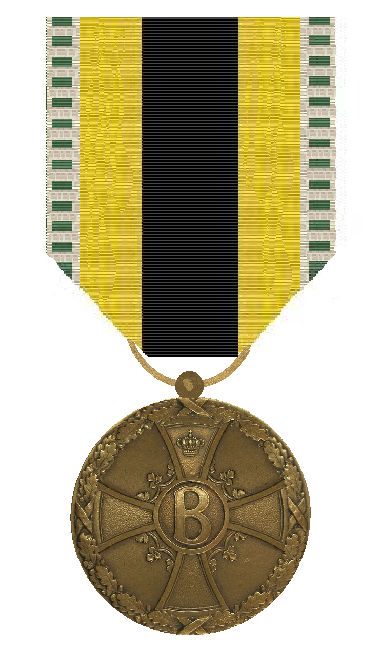
- Type: Military decoration
- Presented by: Saxe-Meiningen
- Status: No longer awarded
- Established: 7 March 1915
- Final award: 1920

Highlights
- Total: 24000
- Related: Cross for Merit in War

The Medal for Merit in War (German: Medaille für Verdienst im Kriege) was a military decoration of the Duchy of Saxe-Meiningen, established during World War I on 7 March 1915 by Bernhard III, Duke of Saxe-Meiningen. For officers, there was the Cross for Merit in War, while the Medal was for enlisted personnel.

== Criteria ==
The medal was awarded to enlisted personnel and some officers for acts of military merit (both combatants and non-combatants), to all members of the Imperial German Army, but especially to those serving in the regiments affiliated with Saxe-Meiningen. Those included the 32nd and 95th Infantry Regiments.

== Description ==
On the front side, the medal had an oak leaf wreath on the edge, bound in each quarter by two crossed ribbons. At the center was a curved cross with a round center sign with the letter "B" in the center. Between the cross arms there were three leaves sticking out of the center. On the back side, there was a shield in the center, with Saxe coat of arms is stylized with cross strips and an oblique diamond ridge. Between the cross-arms, there were three leaves sticking out. Between the middle and the border was the circulatory script: FUR VERDIENST IM KREIGE 1914/15.

The medal manufacturer was AWES coin (A. Werner & Söhne) in Berlin. Lauer from Nuremberg took over production of the war metal.

== Sources ==
=== Literature ===
- Lundström, Richard, and Krause, Daniel. Awards of military orders and honorary marks of the Ernestine Duchies of Saxe-Altenburg, Saxe-Coburg and Gotha and Saxe-Meiningen in the First World War, 1914-1918 (Verleihungen von militärischen Orden und Ehrenzeichen der Ernestinischen Herzogtümer Sachsen-Altenburg, Sachsen-Coburg und Gotha und Sachsen-Meiningen im Ersten Weltkrieg, 1914-1918). 2008.
