= Jagdstaffel 20 =

Jasta 20
- Active: 1916–1918
- Country: German Empire
- Branch: Luftstreitkräfte
- Type: Fighter squadron
- Engagements: World War I

Royal Prussian Jagdstaffel 20 was a fighter squadron of the Luftstreitkräfte, the air arm of the Imperial German Army during World War I.

== History ==
Jasta 20 was founded in the 2 Armee sector on 25 October 1916. On 24 December 1916, it suffered its first casualty. In turn, on 11 March 1917, the unit scored its first victory, courtesy of Leutnant Alfred Niederhoff. The jasta would go on to run its score to 64 confirmed victories. It would also pay a heavy price: 19 pilots killed in action, four more dying in flying accidents, eleven wounded in action, and three injured in accidents.

== Commanding officers ==
1. Oberleutnant Fritz Heising: 25 October 1916 – 19 October 1917
2. Leutnant Rudolf Wendelmuth: 19 October 1917 – 30 November 1917 (KIA)
3. Leutnant Joachim von Busse: 30 November 1917 – 1 August 1918 (WIA)
4. Leutnant von Eckartsburg (Acting): 1 August 1918 – Unknown
5. Leutnant Waldemar von Dazur: Unknown
6. Leutnant Joachim von Busse: Unknown – ca 11 November 1918.

== Duty stations (airfields) ==
1. AFP 2
2. Essigny-le-Petit, France
3. Aisne, France
4. Artemps, France
5. Guise, France
6. Montkerke
7. Varsenare, Belgium
8. Guesnain, France
9. Rumbeke, Belgium
10. Menen, Belgium

== Notable personnel ==
In its short existence, the Jasta had a couple of notable aces serve in it besides Wendelmuth, such as Karl Plauth and Friedrich Mallincrodt. Other aces also served with it, including Raven Freiherr von Barnekow, Johannes Gildemeister, Alfred Niederhoff, Otto Creutzmann, Wilhelm Schwartz, Hermann Stutz, Hans Viebig, and Georg Weiner.

== Aircraft and operations ==
Aircraft operated are unknown at this time.

Although the Jasta was founded in 2 Armee territory, they were moved on 1 January 1917 to support of 6 Armee. On 27 May 1917, they switched to supporting 4 Armee. On 8 December, the squadron was reassigned to support 17 Armee. They remained in this duty until 8 April 1918, when they were transferred back to 4 Armee.
