= Jagdstaffel 64 =

Jasta 64
- Active: 1918
- Country: Kingdom of Württemberg, German Empire
- Branch: Luftstreitkräfte
- Type: Fighter squadron
- Engagements: World War I

Royal Württemberg Jagdstaffel 64, commonly abbreviated to Jasta 64, was a "hunting group" (i.e., fighter squadron) of the Luftstreitkräfte, the air arm of the Imperial German Army during World War I. The squadron would score 20 or more aerial victories during the war. The unit's victories came at the expense of three wounded in action, and three taken prisoner of war.

== History ==
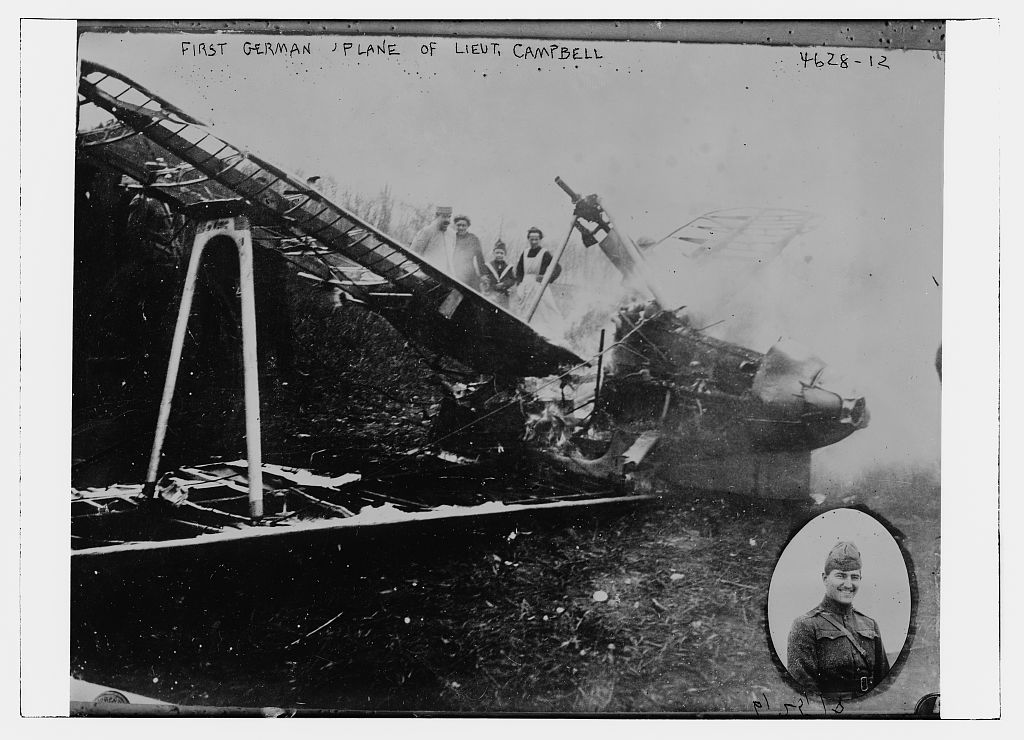
Plane shot down by Lt Campbell

On 23 January 1918, Jasta 64 was founded at Fliegerersatz-Abteilung ("Replacement Detachment") 10, Böblingen. The new squadron was posted to 5 Armee on 4 February 1918 to begin operations. Its first aerial victory claim was submitted on 14 March. On 22 March 1918, Jasta 64 was posted to Armee-Abteilung C, and would remain in that posting through war's end. The three Jasta 64 POWS were Off stv Schueschke on 27 March 1918; and Vzfw Anton Wroniecki (shot down by Douglas Campbell) and Uffz Heinrich Simon (shot down by Alan Winslow) on 14 April 1918.

== Commanding officers (Staffelführer) ==
1. August Hanko: 24 January 1918 – 7 July 1918
2. Eugen Siempelkamp: 25 July 1918 – 14 September 1918 (WIA)
3. Friedrich Hengst: 14 September 1918 – war's end

== Duty stations ==
1. Mercy-le-Haut, France: 4 February 1918
2. Mars-la-Tour, France: 22 March 1918

== Aircraft ==
Originally equipped with Albatros and Pfalz fighters, the later Fokker D.VII fighters scored most aerial victories for the Jasta.
