= Cross for Merit in War =

Sachsen-Meiningen Cross for Merit in War Kreuz für Verdienste im Kriege
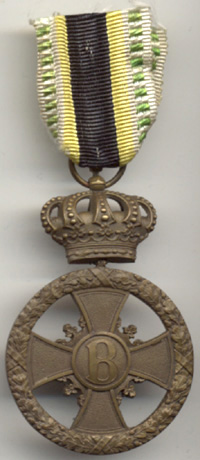
- Obverse of the cross
- Type: Military decoration
- Presented by: Saxe-Meiningen
- Status: No longer awarded
- Established: 7 March 1915
- Final award: 1920

Highlights
- Total: 685 combatants 3924 non-combatants
- Combattant Ribbon Non-combatant ribbon
- Related: Medal for Merit in War

The Cross for Merit in War (German: Kreuz für Verdienste im Kriege) was a military decoration of the Duchy of Saxe-Meiningen established by Bernhard III, Duke of Saxe-Meiningen on 7 March 1915.

== Criteria ==
The Cross for Merit in War was awarded to officers for outstanding merit displayed during World War I. Enlisted personnel were awarded the Medal for Merit in War for similar deeds. The cross could be awarded to combatants and non-combatants, with the ribbon differentiating between the awards.

== Appearance ==
Cross for Merit in War is a bronze cross pattee, the arms of the cross having curved ends. Between the arms is a wreath of rue. The cross is suspended from a five-arched crown. The obverse has a medallion in the center of the cross, bearing the founder's initial B. The entire cross is surrounded by an oak wreath, tied at the cardinal points. The reverse depicts the Arms of Saxony on in the central medallion and the inscription FUR VERDIENST IM KREIGE 1914/15 on the outer edge.

The ribbon is black with yellow side stripes and green and white checkered edges for combatants. For non-combatants the ribbon is also black and yellow, separated from a green edge by white stripes.

== Notable recipients ==
- Erich Ludendorff
- Gustav von Vaerst
- Philipp, Landgrave of Hesse
