= Rudolf Wendelmuth =

German flying ace (1890-1917)

- Born: 28 July 1890; Gotha, Saxe-Coburg and Gotha
- Died: 30 November 1917 (aged 27); Fontaine-Notre-Dame, French Third Republic
- Military career
- Allegiance: German Empire
- Branch: Imperial German Air Service
- Rank: Leutnant
- Unit: FEA 3, FA 8, Jagdstaffel 8
- Commands: Jagdstaffel 20
- Awards: Iron Cross First and Second Class

Leutnant Rudolf Wendelmuth was a World War I German flying ace credited with 14 aerial victories.

== Early life ==
Rudolf Wendelmuth was born on 28 July 1890 in Gotha, Saxe-Coburg and Gotha, the German Empire.

== World War I service ==
=== In the Levant ===
At break of war, Wendelmuth was posted to the 233rd Reserve Infantry Regiment. He transferred to aviation on 1 March 1915, reporting to FEA 3 in his home town of Gotha for training. His first assignment was to Bulgaria in September. In July 1916, he returned to Cologne to Fokker Commando. He was then posted to FA 8 in Sevdi Koy, Turkey as an acting oberleutnant. While with this unit, he scored his first victory, downing a Royal Naval Air Service Farman off the Turkish coast on 5 November 1916.

=== On the Western Front ===
During Bloody April 1917, Wendelmuth returned to the Western Front. He was assigned to Jagdstaffel 8. Between 29 July and 14 October 1917, he accumulated another ten victories; during this span, on 25 September, his plane was shot down but he escaped unharmed.

=== In command ===
On 19 October, he was appointed to command Royal Prussian Jagdstaffel 20. He scored three more wins in October and November 1917. On 30 November, Wendelmuth died in a midair collision that also killed Wilhelm Schulz of Jagdstaffel 4.
