= Joachim von Amsberg (banker) =

German economist and banker

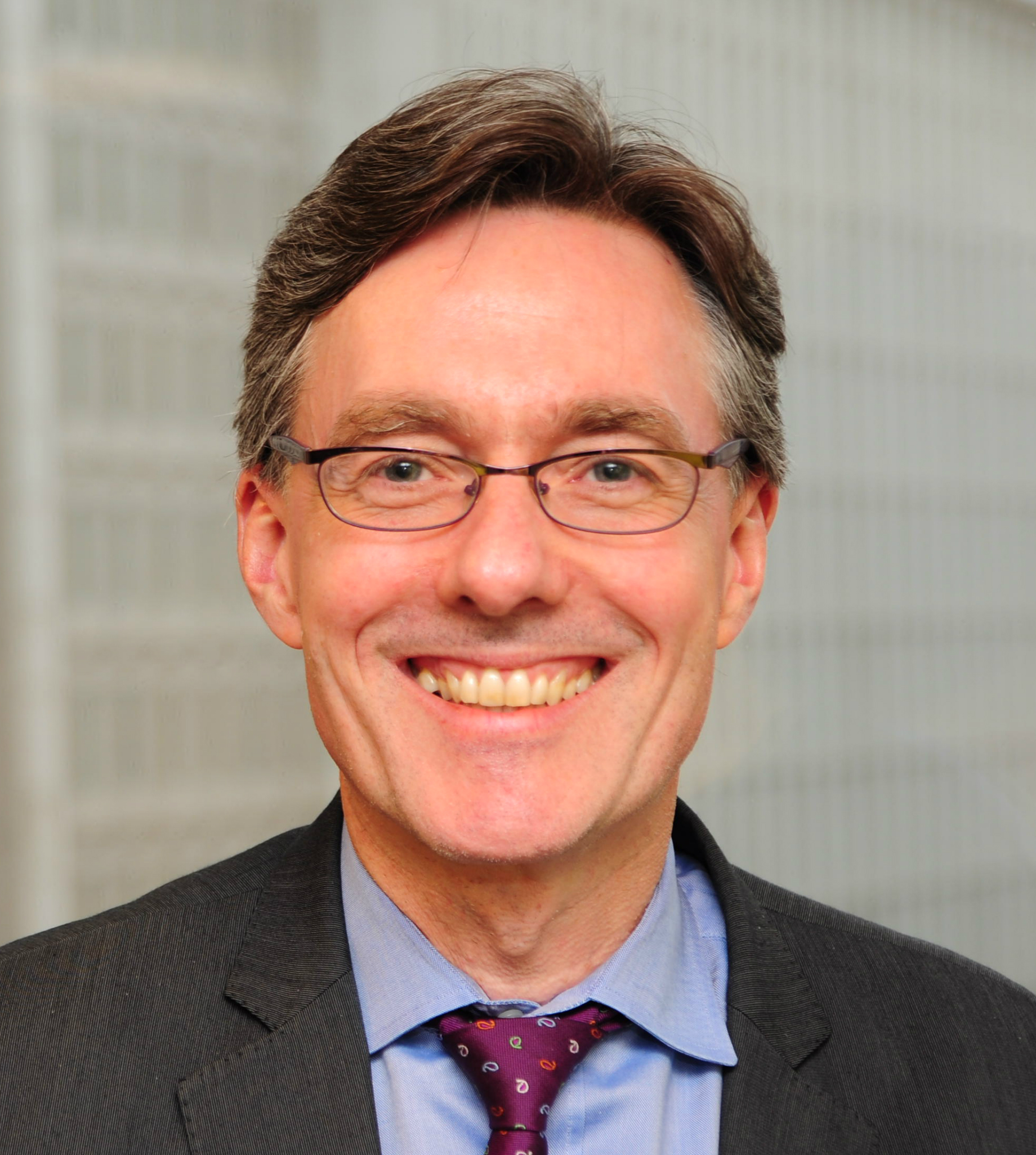
- Born: June 23, 1964 (age 62); Berlin, Germany
- Education: University of British Columbia, Technische Universität Berlin

Joachim von Amsberg (born June 23, 1964) is a German economist, banker, and development finance leader who served, as Vice President, Policy and Strategy of the Asian Infrastructure Investment Bank from 2016 to 2021. Earlier in his career, he was Vice President of the World Bank, responsible for Development Finance.

== Early life and education ==
Von Amsberg was born in Berlin, Germany, as the eldest child of music conductor Dietrich von Amsberg (1937-2021) and his wife, Countess Sophie-Charlotte Elisabeth von Bernstorff (b. 1940). He was educated at the University of British Columbia, Vancouver, Canada (Ph.D. and M.B.A.) and Technische Universität Berlin (M.Sc.). His 1993 Ph.D. thesis focused on environmental policy and carbon pricing in project evaluation.

== Career ==
Von Amsberg joined the World Bank as a Young Professional in 1993. During his early years at the World Bank, he worked as Country Economist on environmental policies, poverty reduction, and economic policy advice for the Governments of Argentina, Brazil, Chile, Egypt, and Paraguay. Subsequently, he was World Bank Country Director in the Philippines (2004-2007) and in Indonesia (2007-2010) where he oversaw World Bank support for Indonesia during the 2008 financial crisis and development partner support for reconstruction after the Aceh tsunami.

In 2010 he was appointed by World Bank President Robert Zoellick as Vice President for Operational Policy and Country Services, including responsibility for the World Bank's Environmental and Social Safeguards policies. In 2013, he was appointed by World Bank President Jim Yong Kim as Vice President for Development Finance. In this role, he was responsible for the replenishment and stewardship of the International Development Association (IDA — the World Bank’s fund for the poorest), Global Partnership and Trust Fund Operations, trusteeship of financial intermediary funds and innovative financing, and financial management of the concessional finance portfolio. He led the 17th replenishment of the International Development Association that mobilized US$52 billion in financing over three years and paved the way for IDA to issue debt in order to finance its investments.

Since 2016 von Amsberg is serving as Vice President Policy and Strategy of the newly created Asian Infrastructure Investment Bank (AIIB). He was appointed by AIIB President Jin Liqun. In this role, von Amsberg drives the strategic direction for the Bank, including its sectoral and country priorities, its investment strategy and programming, its economic analysis and research, and its operating budget. He oversees the Bank's environmental and social policies, other operational policies, and their implementation.

Throughout his career, von Amsberg has pursued his interest in environmental policy and climate change as well as the role of institutions and governance in economic development. He has spoken and written extensively on issues of multilateral cooperation and institutions.

== Personal life ==
He is a member of the noble German House of Amsberg. Von Amsberg is married to Indonesian entrepreneur Satiriantinah Bur Rasuanto. He is the father and step-father of five.
