= Jagdstaffel 6 =

Jasta 6
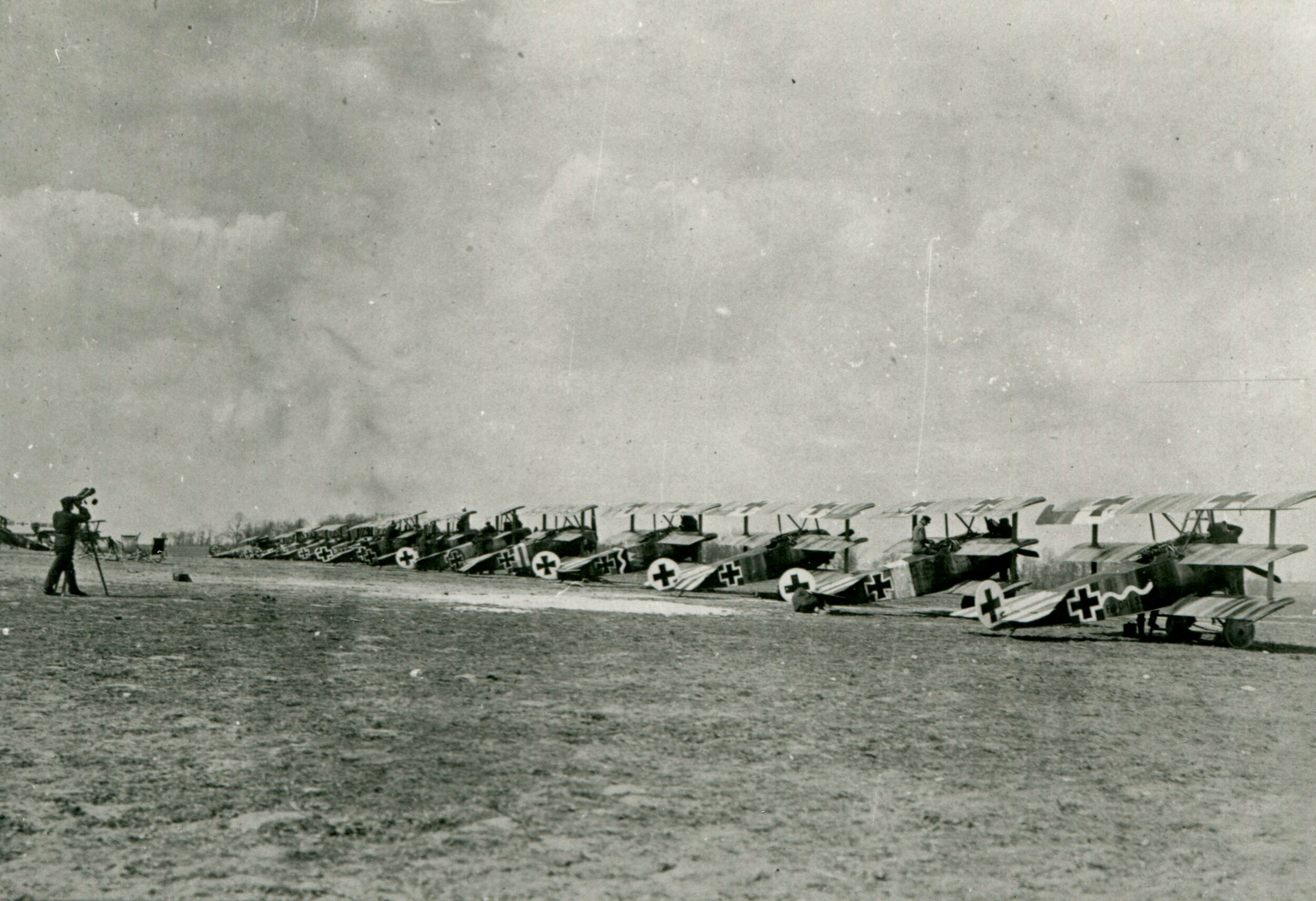
- Fokker Dr.I of Jasta 6
- Active: 1916–1918
- Country: German Empire
- Branch: Luftstreitkräfte
- Type: Fighter squadron
- Engagements: World War I

Royal Prussian Jagdstaffel 6 was one of the original units of the Luftstreitkräfte, the air arm of the Imperial German Army during World War I.

== History ==
The Jasta was founded on 25 August 1916 from Fokkerstaffel Sivry, itself an early attempt to use the new winged weapons of fighter aircraft. On 29 September, it was assigned to 2 Armee and refurbished with Albatros D.I fighters.

When Manfred von Richthofen formed Jagdgeschwader 1 on 24 June 1917, Jasta 6 moved to Markebecke on 2 July to join them. The squadron would remain part of the Flying Circus for the rest of the war. In June, July, and August 1917, the jasta lost a commanding officer per month to enemy action, even as the unit moved from one hot spot to another. It also struggled with technological problems, as it needed genuine castor oil to lubricate the rotary engines of its aircraft.

Jasta 6, at the end of the war, moved back into FEA 9, Darmstadt. On 16 November 1918, they disbanded and passed into history. They had been credited with 196 confirmed aerial victories, at the cost of ten pilots killed in action, 9 wounded in action, two killed in flying accidents, four injured in flying accidents, and two pilots taken prisoner of war.

== Commanding officers ==
- Josef Wulff: 28 August 1916 – 1 May 1917
- Leutnant Fritz Otto Bernert: 1 May 1917 – 9 June 1917
- Oberleutnant Eduard Ritter von Dostler: 24 June 1917 – 21 August 1917 (KIA)
- Leutnant de Reserves Hans Ritter von Adam: 22 August 1917 – 15 November 1917 (KIA)
- Oberleutnant Wilhelm Reinhard: 16 November 1917 – 22 April 1918
- Leutnant de Reserves Johannes Janzen: 28 April 1918 – POW 9 June 1918
- Leutnant de Reserves Hans Kirschstein: 10 June 1918 – 16 July 1918 (Killed in a flying accident)
- Leutnant de Reserves Paul Wenzel (Acting): 19 July 1918 – 11 August 1918 (WIA)
- Leutnant de Reserves Richard Wenzl (Acting): 11 August 1918 – 1 September 1918
- Leutnant de Reserves Ulrich Neckel: 1 September – 11 November 1918

== Duty stations (airfields) ==
- Sivry
- Jametz
- Ugny-l'Équipée
- Aulnoye-Aymeries
- Bisseghem, Courtrai
- Marckebeke
- Lieu St. Armand
- Bouchain
- Awoingt
- Lechelle
- Harbonnières
- Cappy, Somme
- Lomme
- Guise
- Puisieux
- Begneux
- Monthussart Ferme
- Puisieux
- Ennemain
- Bernes
- North of Busigny
- Metz-Frescaty
- Marville
- Tellancourt
- Aschaffenburg: 10 November 1918
- Darmstadt

== Personnel ==
Although most notable aces in the squadron rose to command at one time or another, Franz Hemer and Kurt Küppers served in its ranks and earned honors without succeeding to the helm.

== Aircraft and operations ==
When the squadron was formed, it had eight Fokker Eindeckers, mostly Fokker E.IVs, which it used for its first month of operations. It added Albatros D.Is on strength in September 1916, and had at least one Fokker D.V assigned. Albatros D.IIIs were put into service in March 1917. By June 1917, Albatros D.Vs had been added to the squadron's roster, as well as Fokker Triplanes. Many of the aircraft wore a unit marking of black and white stripes on their elevators; personal insignia went on the fuselage. On the later triplanes, the engine cowling was painted scarlet and white in a petal pattern. By May 1918, the unit was re-equipped with some Fokker D.VIIs. In August, it received some Fokker D.VIIIs, but had to withdraw them from service due to lack of castor oil to lubricate their air-cooled rotary engines.
