= Leopold Anslinger =

World War I flying ace (1891–1978)

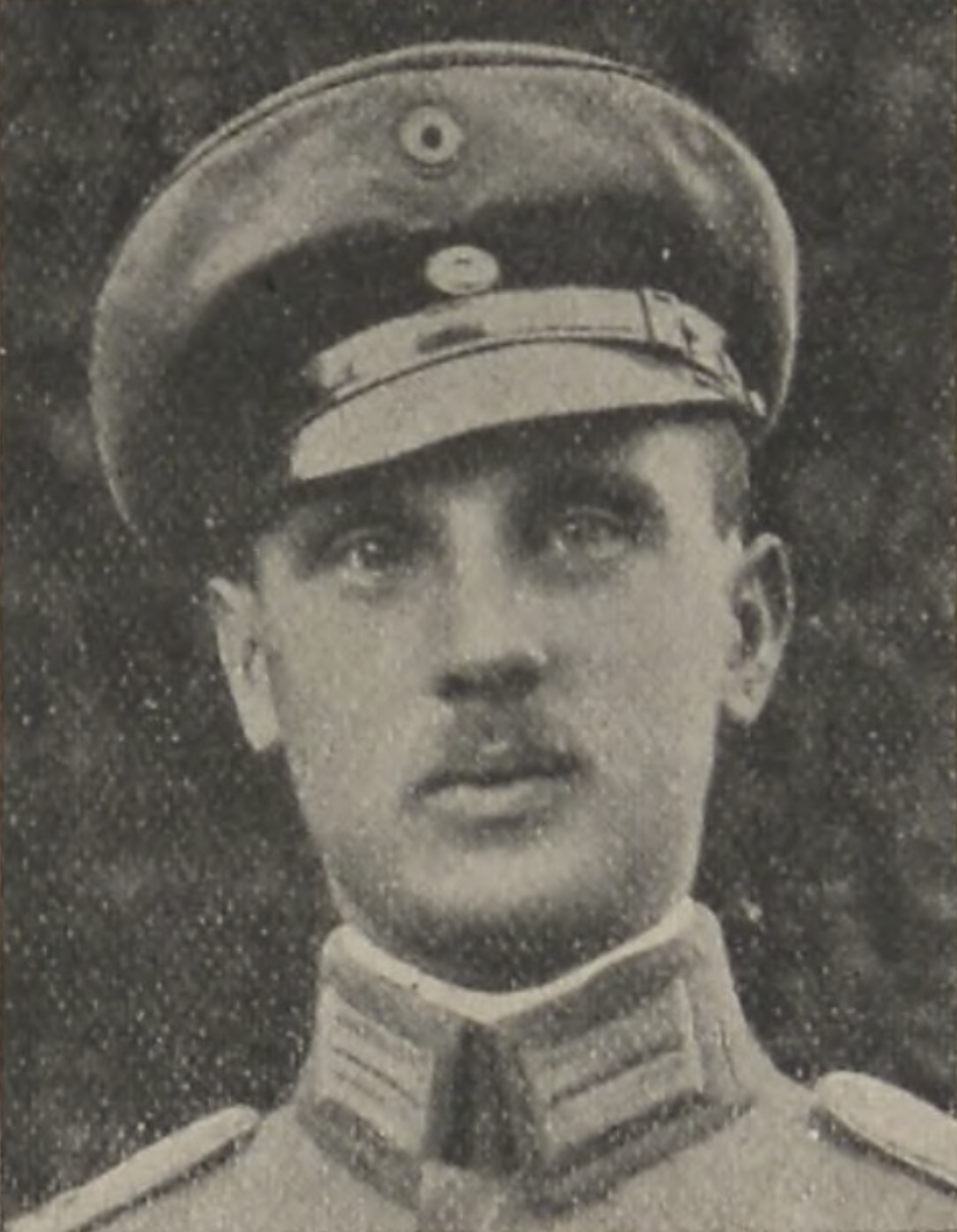
- Leopold Anslinger (c. 1917)
- Born: 13 April 1891; Freiburg
- Died: 18 June 1978 (aged 87); Freiburg
- Military career
- Allegiance: Germany
- Branch: Aviation
- Rank: Leutnant
- Units: Flieger-Abteilung 54 (Flier Detachment 54); Flieger-Abteilung 24/242 (Flier Detachment 24/242); Kampfeinsitzerstaffel 9 (Combat Single-Seater Squadron 9)
- Conflicts: World War I
- Awards: Prussia: Royal House Order of Hohenzollern; Iron Cross Second and First Class; Austro-Hungarian Empire: Military Merit Cross; Order of the Iron Cross; Baden: Ritterkreuz

Leutnant Leopold Anslinger was a German World War I flying ace credited with ten aerial victories while flying on the Russian Front.

== Early life ==
Leopold Anslinger was born on 13 August 1891 in Freiberg, Germany.

== World War I service ==
Anslinger learned to fly pre-World War I, earning pilot certificate No. 566 on 14 October 1913. When the war began, he was a corporal pilot. Promoted to Feldwebel, he was posted to Flieger-Abteilung 54 (Flier Detachment 54) on the Russian Front. He was commissioned on 22 March 1915. He won the Iron Cross Second Class on 17 April 1915 and the First Class on 18 August. On 5 December 1915, he was awarded the Military Merit Cross. Between 18 January and 28 August 1916, he scored his first four victories, three of them over French pilots. He also received further honors, beginning with the February 1916 award of the Austro-Hungarian Military Merit Cross and Baden Ritterkreuz, followed by the Royal House Order of Hohenzollern and the Austro-Hungarian Iron Cross.

Anslinger was transferred to Flieger-Abteilung 24/242 (Flier Detachment 24/242) and teamed with Wilhelm Frickart as his gunner. Together, they scored six wins between 12 April and 30 June 1917. Anslinger was then transferred to Kampfeinsitzerstaffel 9 (Combat Single-Seater Squadron 9) in Mainz on homeland defense duties.

== Post World War I ==
Leopold Anslinger was a pilot for Lufthansa. He died on 18 June 1978.
