= Otto Hasse =

Otto Hasse may refer to:

- Otto Hasse (general) (1871–1942), German general
- O. E. Hasse (1903–1978), German actor
