= Richard Lepper =

- Born: 15 July 1897
- Died: 30 March 1943 (aged 45) near Stalingrad
- Military career
- Allegiance: German Empire; Weimar Republic; Nazi Germany
- Branch: Army
- Service years: 1914–1943
- Rank: Generalmajor
- Commands: Artilleriekommandeur 6
- Conflicts: Battle of Stalingrad
- Awards: Knight's Cross of the Iron Cross

Richard Lepper (15 July 1897 – 30 March 1943) was a general in the Wehrmacht of Nazi Germany during World War II. He was a recipient of the Knight's Cross of the Iron Cross. Lepper surrendered to the Soviet troops after the fall of Stalingrad. He died in captivity on 30 March 1943.

== Awards and decorations ==
- Knight's Cross of the Iron Cross on 17 December 1942 as Oberst and commander of Artilleriekommandeur 6
