= Jagdgeschwader III =

German fighter wing

- Jagdgeschwader III
- Active: 2 February 1918
- Disbanded: 11 November 1918
- Country: Germany
- Allegiance: German Empire
- Branch: Luftstreitkräfte
- Type: Fighter wing
- Role: Air to air combat
- Size: Nominally 56 aircraft
- Colors: Jagdstaffel 2: Tailplanes split between black and white; black and white cowlings, Jagdstaffel 26: Black and white banded fuselages; black cowlings, Jagdstaffel 27: Black and white banded fuselages; yellow cowlings, Jagdstaffel 36: Black and white banded fuselages; blue cowlings
- Engagements: Operation Michael; Battle of the Lys (1918); Third Battle of the Aisne; Second Battle of the Marne; Amiens Offensive; Battle of Bapaume; Battle of Saint-Mihiel

Commanders
- Notable commanders: Hauptmann Bruno Loerzer

Aircraft flown
- Fighter: Albatros D.III; Albatros D.V; Fokker Dr.I; Fokker D.VII; Pfalz D.XII; Fokker E.V

Jagdgeschwader III (Fighter Wing III, or JG III) was a fighter wing of the Imperial German Air Service during World War I. It was founded on 2 February 1918, as a permanent consolidation of four established jagdstaffeln (fighter squadrons)—2, 26, 27, and 36. JG III was formed as a follow-on of Manfred von Richthofen's highly successful Jagdgeschwader I. With a nominal strength of 56 aircraft, JG III would be under direct orders of an Armee headquarters. The German General Staff was planning a German spring offensive to begin on 21 March 1918, and wanted to assign a fighter wing to each of the three Armees involved in the assault. (Note: Jagdgeschwader II was founded the same day from Jastas 12, 13, 15, and 19.) An experienced flying ace with 22 victories, Oberleutnant Bruno Loerzer, was appointed to command JG III.

On 12 to 15 March 1918, JG III's aircraft would be hidden near the front lines awaiting the Spring Offensive. On 21 March, the wing cleared the sky of opposing aircraft, to begin their support of Operation Michael. Subsequent to this, the wing would fight in the Battle of the Lys, the Third Battle of the Aisne, and the Second Battle of the Marne offensives. When the Allied Hundred Days Offensive began on 8 August, JG III was still in the fight. Despite increasing shortages of supplies, aircraft, and pilots, along with frequent changes of airfields during withdrawals, the wing had its most successful month of the war in September. On 2 September, JG III shot down 26 enemy aircraft, for the best day's performance of any German wing in World War I. However, by October, the Allied air forces—which now included fresh American units—were numerous enough to overwhelm German defenses.

Jagdgeschwader III flew its final combat missions on 4 November 1918. Incomplete records make the wing's wartime victory total uncertain, but it is conservatively estimated as a minimum of 370 French, British, and American aircraft shot down.

== Operational history ==
=== Foundation ===
Jagdgeschwader III (JG III) was founded on 2 February 1918. It comprised four Jagdstaffeln (fighter squadrons) with a nominal strength of 14 aircraft each. This fighter wing would fly under direction of an Army Headquarters. The success of such a massing of fighter aircraft power had already been proven by the success of Jagdgeschwader I (JG I), founded 23 June the previous year. German strategy now called for a fighter wing per army to support each of three attacking armies. Jagdgeschwader II (JG II) and Jagdgeschwader III were slated to be combat ready in time to join JG I in the German spring offensive planned for 21 March 1918. JG III would consist of four existing seasoned Jagdstaffeln—2, 26, 27, and 36. Oberleutnant Bruno Loerzer was selected for command of JG III.

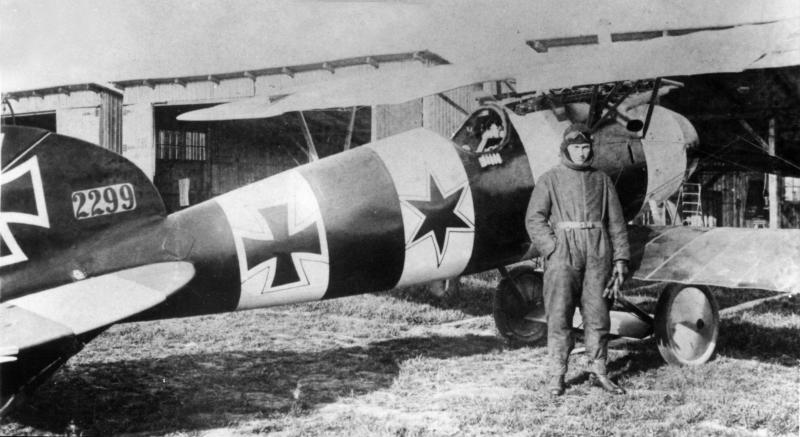
Bruno Loerzer and his Albatros D.V

From 12 to 15 March 1918, the four squadrons of the new wing moved forward to support 17th Armee when the attack began. Nine additional jastas had also been moved there. Hangar tents were not erected for airplanes; the machines were hidden in farm buildings to prevent observation by enemy reconnaissance craft. Flying was kept to a bare minimum, as JG III husbanded its resources while awaiting the upcoming offensive.

=== Operation Michael ===
Fog and low clouds prevented flying until about noon on 21 March, after which the wing established air superiority over the British positions. The next day, JG III tangled with British pilots of the Royal Flying Corps (RFC) over Cambrai, claiming two victories and sustaining a casualty. On 23 March, the RFC concentrated on attacking the German army cooperation two-seaters near Bapaume. In turn, the German fighter pilots assailed the British. JG III was credited with nine victories that day; however, British aircraft managed for the first time to strafe the advancing German troops. The RFC reinforced its numbers on 24 and 25 March. The morning of 26 March saw the greatest British force yet, with formations as numerous as 60 planes. The confused, ferocious air combats continued over the next two days. Then the German advance stalled. Air activity dwindled.

=== Battle of the Lys ===
The German high command began a further offense on 12 April. JG III was shifted to support the 4th Armee for an attack on Kemmel Ridge. Ten additional jadgstaffeln were placed under Loerzer's command. The 14 squadrons were committed to a front only 15 kilometers wide, and penetrated deep into British-held territory. On 25 April, three German divisions stormed the hill. Overhead, about 100 German aircraft flew unopposed. German ground support planes strafed the British while JG III flew top cover.

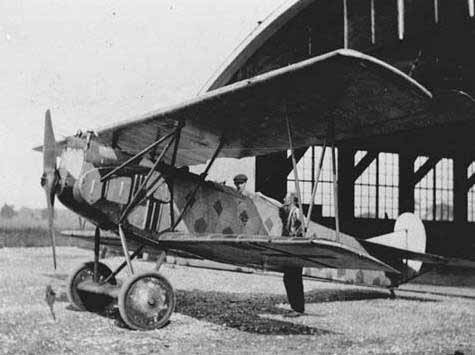
A Fokker D.VII in factory finish

This latest offensive petered out by the end of April. The pilots of JG III anxiously awaited new Fokker D.VII fighters. Their old Albatros fighters were worn out; the new Triplanes were too slow, and needed scarce castor oil for a reliable rotary engine lubricant. When a few of the new aircraft arrived, they were parceled out, with three squadrons each receiving some. Jagdstaffel 26 kept its triplanes, but other spare Fokker Dr.Is were returned to the rear.

By 24 May 1918, JG III had moved to support the upcoming German offensive against the Chemin des Dames. The German high command wanted to defeat the Allies before American troops could enter the war. For the first time, French fliers would oppose the Germans.

=== Third Battle of the Aisne ===
The next offensive was launched by the Germans on 27 May. Surging forward under air cover, the German infantry gained 21 kilometers to capture bridges crossing the Marne River. However, by 3 June 1918, the exhausted German troops ran down. With heavy casualties, insufficient supplies and few reinforcements, the attack stalled.

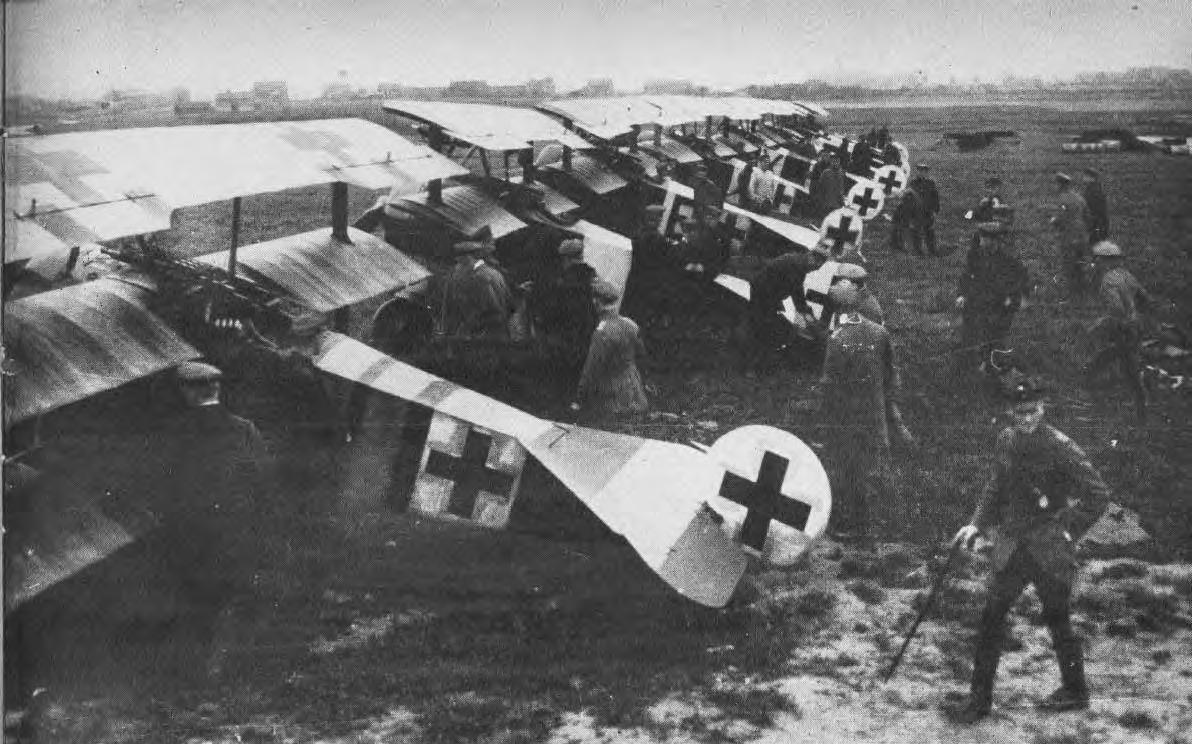
The Fokker Dr.I triplanes of Jasta 26 waiting on their flightline

Now three of JG III's squadrons were re-equipped with Fokker D.VIIs. Jagdstaffel 36 remained stocked with Fokker Dr.I triplanes.

The wing now partnered with JG I on 9 June 1918, for the latest segment of the German Spring Offensive. JG III covered the 18th Armee's flank. Fighting continued through the month. By the 28th, a new foe had appeared to oppose JG III—the American First Pursuit Group.

=== Second Battle of the Marne ===
On 15 July 1918, the Germans launched another offensive. JG III supported 7th Armee, and in turn was supported by JG I. As 7th Armee was the first to attack, it saw heavy fighting. JG III was now equipped with Fokker D.VIIs equipped with parachutes, but it faced opposition from an array of French, American, and British squadrons. Despite excessive heat and rainy weather, air activity over the battlefield was brisk. An armada of 225 French bombers struck German pontoon bridges crossing the Marne River, dropping 40 tons of bombs. By nightfall, JG III had downed seven enemy planes.

The following day was hotter still. There was a very real danger that phosphorus ammunition aboard any German aircraft could ignite from the extreme temperatures; seven German airplanes supporting 7th Armee were lost to self-ignition of ammunition during 15 and 16 July.

On 17 July, German progress on the ground stalled with the arrival of the British XXII Corps and 85,000 American as reinforcements for the French. Heavy rain and fog restricted air activity. The following day saw a French counterattack. Over the next few days, JG III had to move to the rear as the French assault gained ground. When foul weather grounded the wing on 26 and 27 July, the unit had been displaced three times. By the beginning of August, the air offensive had fizzled out in a week-long rain that prevented flight.

=== Tide of battle turns ===
On 8 August 1918, the British 4th Army and the French 1st Army surged into an attack launched on the heels of a heavy artillery bombardment. The assault included a large force of tanks and a huge air effort by the Royal Air Force. The German 2nd Armee, located northwest of JG III, bore the brunt of the blow. The wing fought intensely for three days, racking up nine victories. On 12 August, JG III was held patrolling behind their own lines in anticipation of another Allied attack near Fismes. The next two days were spent flying in the van of the German attack; there was no concerted Allied air opposition.

=== Battle of Bapaume ===
The next stage of the Allied Hundred Days Offensive came on 21 August 1918. The British Third Army attacked, supported by 100 tanks and newly committed American air power. Pilots from JG III dove on four 148th Aero Squadron Sopwith Camels on a ground attack mission on 26 August. Nine Camels of the 17th Aero Squadron came to the aid of their fellow Americans. In the ensuing dogfight, seven Americans were downed for no German loss. Six of the casualties came from the 17th Aero Squadron.

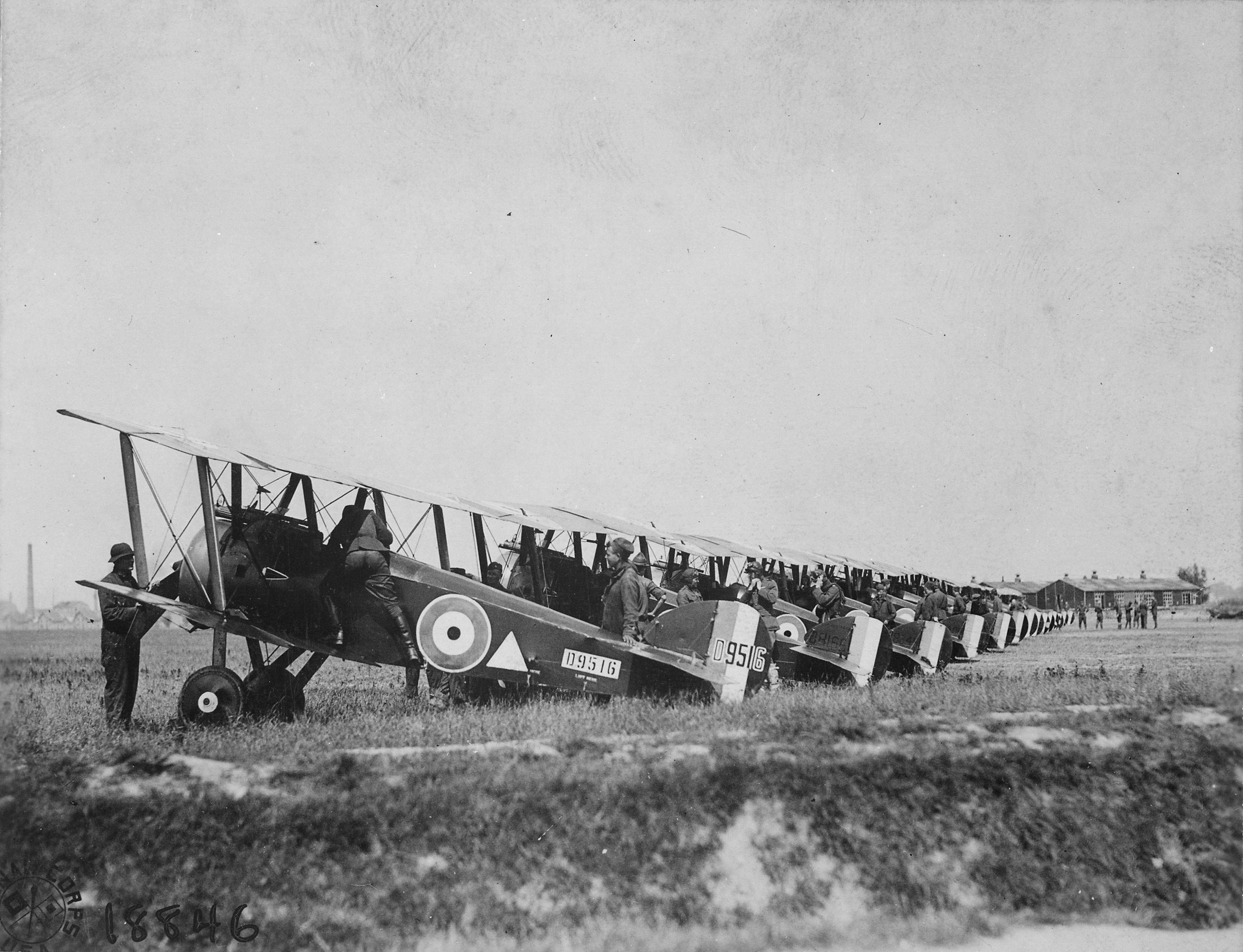
The American 148th Aero Squadron pilots stand by their Sopwith Camels.

In the final six days of August, Jagdgeschwader III scored 23 victories. On 2 September, they bettered that in a single day. The wing scored 26 of the 35 German aerial victories on 2 September. The 148th Aero Squadron took the brunt of the action; out of B Flight's five pilots, only one returned home. By the last mission of the day, there was no aerial opposition to the wing; JG III turned to strafing enemy troops. JG III had had the most successful day of any German wing in World War I.

On 3 September, the German wing downed 10 more enemy planes; on the next day, 15 more. The wing would continue to wage its successful campaign, although by 17 September Jagdstaffel 36 had only a single airplane. On 18 September, a headquarters summary from the 17th Armee noted that JG III had destroyed 250 enemy aircraft in 202 days of fighting. On 24 September, Jagdstaffel 36 received an infusion of Fokker D.VIIs; however, the squadron would not score another victory until 4 October.

Jagdgeschwader III continued to fight through the end of September, but several factors began to degrade its combat capabilities. There were frequent airfield changes due to the retreat of German ground forces. Fuel for the airplanes began to be rationed. A trio of JG III's most prolific aces dropped from the wing's ranks in late September—Rudolf Klimke, Otto Fruhner, and Friedrich Noltenius.

Records for October 1918's wing operations are scarce. However, those existing depict a diminished wing constantly on the move and curtailed by supply shortages. They were faced with overwhelming numbers of Allied fighters. Mid-month, Bruno Loerzer, lately promoted to Hauptmann, took Paul Baumer with him to the new fighter testing at Adlershof, Germany. That removed two more high scoring aces from the ranks of JG III. From 14 to 25 October, JG III scored no victories. Nevertheless, on the war's heaviest day of aerial combat, 30 October, the wing still shot down 10 enemy aircraft.

=== End ===
On 4 November 1918, all four jadgstaffeln of Jagdgeschwader III flew into combat, scoring victories against Bristol F.2b and Sopwith Snipe fighters and an Airco DH.9 bomber. These 13 victories would be the last by JG III. The Armistice of 11 November 1918 would end the war.

The wing's pilots remained defiant to the end. Before surrendering their Fokker D.VIIs to the Allies, Jagdstaffel 2 pilots wrote their names and the number of their aerial victories on the aircraft fuselages.

Incomplete records preclude an exact count of Jagdgeschwader III victories. However, they are estimated at a minimum of 370 enemy aircraft destroyed during the wing's nine months of existence.

== Commanding officer ==
- Hauptmann Bruno Loerzer: 21 February—11 November 1918

== Notable members ==
Below is the listing of flying aces serving with Jagdgeschwader III, the number of victories they scored while flying with the wing, and the most prestigious decoration they received.

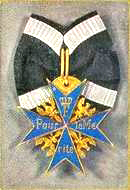
The Pour le Mérite was equivalent to the Victoria Cross or Medal of Honor.

- Hauptmann (later Generaloberst) Bruno Loerzer, 22 victories, Pour le Mérite
- Oberleutnant Carl Bolle, 31 victories, Pour le Mérite
- Leutnant Hermann Frommherz, 30 victories, Military Order of Saint Henry
- Leutnant de Reserve Paul Bäumer, 25 victories, Pour le Mérite
- Vizefeldwebel (later Generalmajor) Otto Fruhner, 21 victories, Military Merit Cross
- Leutnant (later Generalmajor) Ernst Bormann, 16 victories, Knight's Cross with Oak Leaves
- Leutnant Friedrich Noltenius, 13 victories, Royal House Order of Hohenzollern
- Leutnant Rudolf Klimke, 12 victories, Iron Cross
- Vizefeldwebel Erich Buder, 12 victories, Military Merit Cross
- Offizierstellvertreter Otto Esswein, 11 victories, Military Merit Cross
- Leutnant Helmut Lange, 9 victories, Iron Cross First Class
- Leutnant Franz Brandt, 7 victories, Royal House Order of Hohenzollern
- Leutnant (later Major) Theodor Quandt, 7 victories, Royal House Order of Hohenzollern
- Oberleutnant (later General) Hermann Dahlmann, 6 victories, Knight's Cross with Swords of the Royal House Order of Hohenzollern
- Oberleutnant (later Reichsmarshal) Hermann Göring, 6 victories, Pour le Mérite
- Vizefeldwebel Alfred Hübner, 6 victories, Iron Cross First Class
- Feldwebel Willy Kahle, 6 victories, Military Merit Order with Swords
- Offizierstellvertreter Willi Kampe, 6 victories, Iron Cross
- Leutnant Hermann Vallendor, 6 victories, Order of the Zahringer Lion
- Leutnant (later Generalmajor) Gerhard Bassenge, 5 victories, Deutschescross in Gold
- Leutnant Heinrich Bongartz, 5 victories, Pour le Mérite
- Leutnant (later Oberstleutnant) Harry von Bulow-Bothkamp, 3 victories, Knight's Cross of the Royal House Order of Hohenzollern
- Leutnant Hans Gottfried von Häbler, 3 victories, Royal House Order of Hohenzollern

== Aircraft ==
The following models of aircraft are known to have been flown by Jagdgeschwader III.

- Albatros D.III
- Albatros D.V
- Pfalz D.VIII
- Pfalz D.XII
- Fokker Dr.I
- Fokker D.VII
- Fokker D.VIII
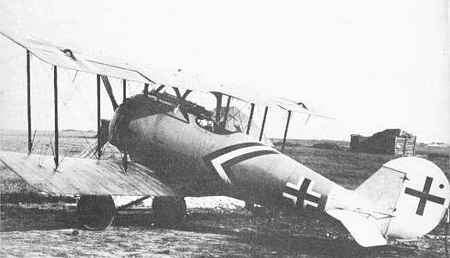
Paul Baumer's Pfalz D.VIII

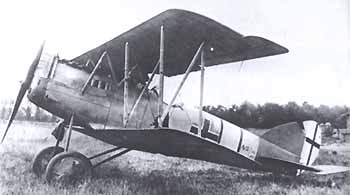
A Pfalz D.XII fighter ready for takeoff

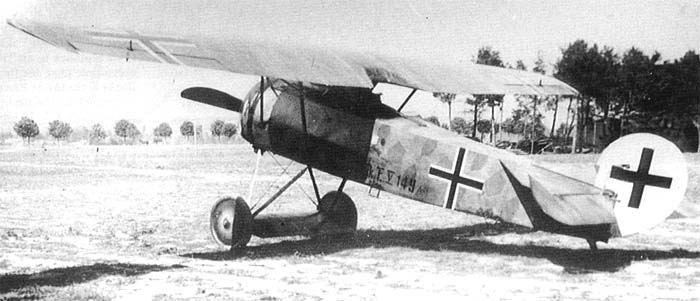
A Fokker D.VIII, also on alert status

== Bibliography ==
- Franks, Norman; Bailey, Frank W.; Guest, Russell (1993). Above the Lines: A Complete Record of the Aces and Fighter Units of the German Air Service, Naval Air Service and Flanders Marine Corps 1914–1918. London: Grub Street. ISBN 0-948817-73-9.
- Jagdstaffel 2 'Boelcke': Von Richthofen's Mentor. Oxford UK: Osprey Publishing. 2007. ISBN 978-1-84603-203-5.
- VanWyngarden, Greg (2016). Aces of Jagdgeschwader Nr III. Oxford UK: Osprey Publishing. ISBN 978-1-4728-0843-1.
