= Jagdstaffel 17 =

Jasta 17
- Active: 1916–1918
- Country: German Empire
- Branch: Luftstreitkräfte
- Type: Fighter squadron
- Part of: Jagdgruppe Nord
- Engagements: World War I

Royal Prussian Jagdstaffel 17 was a "hunting group" (i.e., fighter squadron) of the Luftstreitkräfte, the air arm of the Imperial German Army during World War I. As one of the original German fighter squadrons, the unit would score 101 aerial victories (including fourteen wins over enemy observation balloons) during the war, with another 22 of the squadron's claims going unconfirmed.

The Jasta paid a price of ten killed in action, two lost in flying accidents, six wounded in action, and three injured in accidents.

== History ==
Royal Prussian Jagdstaffel 17 was formed at Army Flugpark 5 on 23 October 1916. It absorbed the pre-existing ad hoc KEK Metz. In August 1917, they became part of Jagdgruppe Nord along with Kest 8, Jasta 2, Jasta 20, and Jasta 28. In March 1918, it was collated with Jasta 22 and Jasta 63 into Jagdgruppe II; their former commander, Rittmeister von Brederlow succeeded to its command a bit later. By Summer 1918, Jasta 17 anchored JGr II, while the other squadrons in the group became Jasta 48, Jasta 53, and Jasta 61. Jasta 17 fought until war's end. Two days later, they relocated to FEA 5, Hannover. On 7 December 1918, they disbanded.

== Commanding officers (Staffelführer) ==
1. Heinz von Brederlow: 11 November 1916 - 10 May 1917
2. Eberhard von Seel: 10 May 1917 - 12 June 1917 (KIA) (claimed by René Paul Fonck)
3. Ernst Wendler: 19 June 1917 - 1 October 1917 (WIA)
4. Rudolf von Esebeck: 4 October 1917 - 27 May 1918 (KIA)
5. Hermann Pritsch (Acting CO): 29 May 1918 - 12 June 1918
6. Günther Schuster: 12 June 1918 - 1 August 1918 (WIA)
7. Julius Buckler: 1 August 1918 - 11 November 1918

== Aerodromes ==
1. Metz-Frescaty: 11 November 1916 – early March 1917
2. St. Quentin-le-Petit: Early March 1917 – 24 June 1917
3. Gistel, Belgium: 24 June 1917 – August 1917
4. Wasquehal, France: August 1917 – November 1917
5. Eringhem, Belgium: November 1917 – December 1917
6. Neuvilly, France: December 1917 – 28 December 1917
7. Retheuil, France: 28 December 1917 – Unknown
8. Douilly, France
9. Balâtre, France
10. Erchau
11. Mars-sous-Bourcq, France
12. Vivaise, France
13. Chuffilly-Roche, France
14. Malmy-Chéméry
15. St. Medard, Neufchâteau: Unknown – 13 November 1918

== Notable members ==
Julius Buckler was the predominant ace of Jasta 17. He entered the unit as an enlisted man, scored its first victory on 17 December 1916, won the Military Merit Cross, rose through the ranks to be commissioned an officer,and became not only its leading ace but one of the leading German aces over all. To top it off, he won the Pour le Merite, was probably the only German ace to be wounded seriously enough times to receive the Golden Wound Badge, and became the squadron's final Staffelführer.

Not that he was the only notable among the unit's eight aces. There were Gustav Schneidewind and Christian Donhauser with a Military Merit Cross and an Iron Cross apiece. The squadron's other aces were Georg Strasser, Karl Bohny, Alfred Fleischer, Otto Fitzner, and Günther Schuster

== Aircraft ==
The new Jasta was equipped with at least one Halberstadt D.II, several Albatros D.II and Albatros D.IIIs at inception. Albatros D.V started to appear in July 1917, Pfalz D.III and D.IIIas were received in October 1917 - end January 1918, two Pfalz D.XII and 12 Fokker D.VII were on strength at the Armistice.

== Operations ==
Jasta 17 originated on the front of the 5th Armee. On 11 November 1916, it became operational to the Armee-Abteilung A Sector. It switched to support of 7th Armee in early March 1917, then onward to support 1st Armee. After its move northward on 24 June 1917 to Ghistelle, it supported 4th Armee. By the end of 1917, the squadron was operating on 2nd Armee's front.

== In popular culture ==
Fictional War comic character Enemy Ace aka Baron Hans Von Hammer aka "The Hammer of hell" commands Jasta 17 in World War I.

== Bibliography ==
- Bailleux, Yves & Cony, Christophe (November 2001). "As allemands 14/18: Georg Strasser et la Jasta 17" [German Aces of the Great War: Georg Strasser and Jasta 17]. Avions: Toute l'Aéronautique et son histoire (in French) (104): 50–56. ISSN 1243-8650.
- Franks, Norman; Bailey, Frank W. & Guest, Russell F. (1993). Above The Lines: The Aces and Fighter Units of the German Air Service, Naval Air Service, and Flanders Marine Corps, 1914–1918. London, UK: Grub Street. ISBN 978-0-948817-73-1.
- VanWyngarden, Greg (2013). Aces of Jagdstaffel 17. Osprey Publishing. ISBN 978-1-78096-718-9.
