= Buder =

Buder is a German surname. Notable people with the surname include:

- Andreas Buder (born 1979), Austrian alpine skier
- Erich Buder (1896–1975), German World War I flying ace
- Ernst Erich Buder (1896–1962), German composer
- Karin Buder (born 1964), Austrian alpine skier
- Madonna Buder (born 1930), American triathlete
- Manfred Buder (1936–2021), German ice hockey player
- Oliver-Sven Buder (born 1966), German shot putter
- Johannes Buder (disambiguation)
