= Jagdstaffel 26 =

Jasta 26
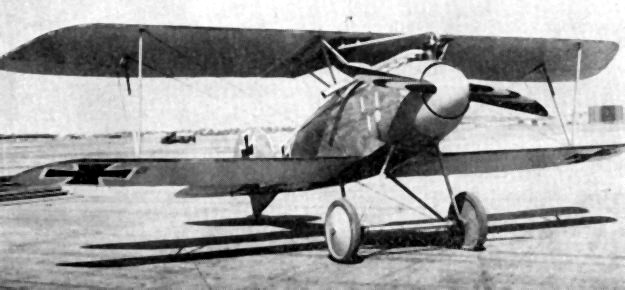
- Albatross D.IIIs were the original mounts for Jasta 26.
- Active: 1916–1918
- Country: German Empire
- Branch: Luftstreitkräfte
- Type: Fighter squadron
- Engagements: World War I

Royal Prussian Jagdstaffel 26 was a "hunting group" (i.e., fighter squadron) of the Luftstreitkräfte, the air arm of the Imperial German Army during World War I. As one of the original German fighter squadrons, the unit would score 177 verified aerial victories, including four observation balloons destroyed. The Jasta would pay a bloody price for its success: five pilots killed in action, nine wounded in action, and one prisoner of war.

== Operational history ==
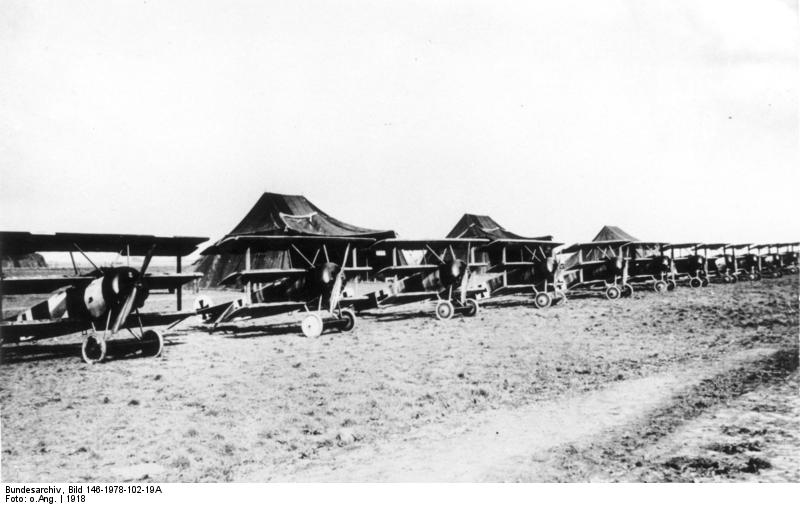
The Jasta 26 flightline on 21 March 1918, the first day of the German Spring Offensive.

=== As an independent squadron ===
Royal Prussian Jagdstaffel 26 (Jasta 26) was founded on 14 December 1916 at the FEA 9 training center in Darmstadt. On 18 January 1917, it entrained for Colmar Nord. It was detailed to support of Armee-Abteilung B. Its first Staffelfuhrer (Commanding Officer) was Bruno Loerzer, assigned 21 January 1917. Its first war patrols followed a week later. On 25 February, his old friend Hermann Göring joined Jasta 26. Also, the squadron's first victory was scored on 25 February 1917.

From there, it was assigned to 2nd Armee Sector on 12 April. On 17 May, Göring transferred to command of Jasta 27 after his seventh victory. On 8 June, the jasta was reassigned to 4th Armee Sector. The squadron carried on its missions throughout mid-1917, with victory scores mounting and aces coming into their own. By September, they were well known to their Royal Flying Corps foes.

Slackened operations marked the end of 1917. In January 1918, Jasta 26 began to receive Fokker D.V aircraft, and anticipated garnering new Fokker Dr.I triplanes. When the jasta was incorporated in JG III, it already had been credited with more than 70 aerial victories.

=== As part of a wing ===
On 21 February 1918, Jasta 26 was assigned to Jagdgeschwader III (JG III), along with Jasta 2, Jasta 27, and Jasta 36. Hauptmann Loerzer was promoted to command the new wing. His younger brother, Fritz Loerzer, assumed command of Jasta 26.

As part of JG III, Jasta 26 would battle to the end of the war. On 13 March 1918, the squadron moved to support 17th Armee. A month later, on 11 April, they moved back to aid 4 Armee. On 27 May 1918, they were seconded to 7th Armee. On 25 August 1918, the entire JG III was assigned to support of 17th Armee for Jasta 26's last posting of the war.

Royal Prussian Jagdstaffel 26 would end the war as one of the top-scoring German fighter squadrons. It disbanded at FEA 5 at Hannover, Germany on 3 December 1918.

=== The blood price ===
Accredited aerial victories for the squadron totaled 180—176 airplanes and four observation balloons.

The casualty list for Jagdstaffel 26 came to five killed, 11 wounded, one injured in a flying accident, and four captured.

== Commanding officers (Staffelführer) ==
1. Oberleutnant Bruno Loerzer: transferred in from Jasta 17 on 21 January 1917 – promoted to command JG III on 21 February 1918
2. Leutnant Fritz Loerzer: transferred in from Jasta 63 on 21 February 1918 – taken POW on 12 June 1918
3. Bollmann (Acting CO): 12 June 1918 – 27 June 1918
4. Leutnant Franz Brandt: 27 June 1918 – 22 August 1918
5. Leutnant Helmut Lange (Acting CO): 22 August 1918 – 12 September 1918
6. Franz Brandt: 12 September 1918 – 11 November 1918

== Aerodromes ==
1. Darmstadt, Germany: 14 December 1916 – 20 January 1917
2. Colmar Nord: 20 January 1917 – 2 March 1917
3. Habsheim, France: 2 March 1917 – 12 April 1917
4. Guise-Ost: 16 April 1917 – 23 April 1917
5. Bohain-Nord: 23 April 1917 – 6 June 1917
6. Iseghem: 8 June 1917 – 10 September 1917
7. Abeele, Belgium: 11 September 1917 – 1 November 1917
8. Bavinchove, France: 2 November 1917 – 10 February 1918
9. Markebecke: 11 February 1918 – 12 March 1918
10. Erchin, France: 13 March 1918 – 10 April 1918
11. Halluin-Ost: 11 April 1918 – 23 May 1918
12. Vivaise, France: 24 May 1918 – 7 June 1918
13. Mont Soissons Ferme, France: 8 June 1918 – 18 July 1918
14. Vauxcéré, France: 19 July 1918 – 30 July 1918
15. Chambry, France: 31 July 1918 – 24 August 1918
16. Émerchicourt: 25 August 1918 – 26 September 1918
17. Lieu St. Armand: 27 September 1918 – 29 September 1918
18. Soultain: 30 September 1918 – 12 October 1918
19. Lenz: 13 October 1918 – 4 November 1918
20. Aische-en-Befail: 5 November 1918 – 11 November 1918

== Notable members ==
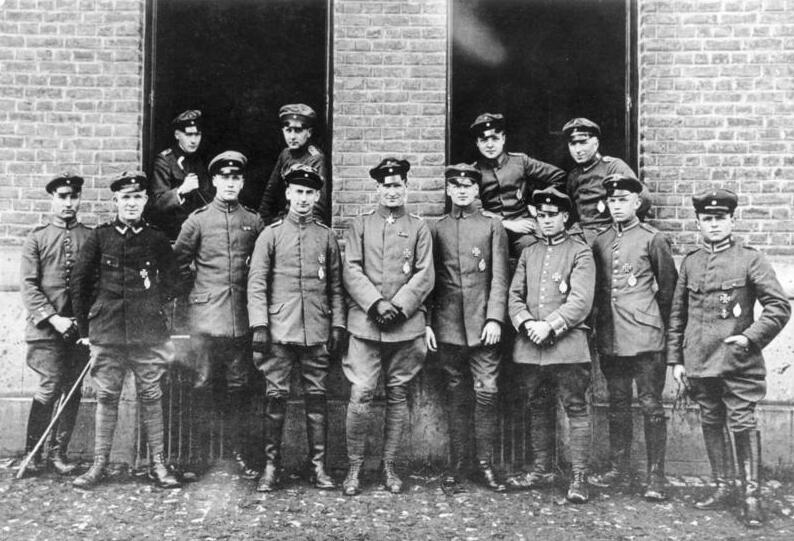
Group photo of the pilots of Jasta 26: left to right: Buder, Klassen, Riemer, Zogmann, Weiß (z.b.V.), Fritz Loerzer, Bruno Loerzer, Mar. At right Fritz Beckhardt. May 1918

- Hermann Göring, Pour le Mérite, Royal House Order of Hohenzollern, Iron Cross, served a couple of months with Jasta 26 while making ace.
- Bruno Loerzer, Pour le Mérite, Royal House Order of Hohenzollern, Iron Cross, scored over half of his 44 victories while commanding Jasta 26.
- The squadron's other winner of the "Blue Max" was Walter Blume, who also rated an Iron Cross.
- Otto Fruhner, leading ace of the Jasta with 27 wins, won the enlisted man's equivalent of the Blue Max, the Military Merit Cross, as well as the Iron Cross.
- Erich Buder and Otto Esswein also won the MMC and Iron Cross.
- Fritz Beckhardt, Fritz Kosmahl and Franz Brandt all three won both the Royal House Order of Hohenzollern and Iron Cross.
- Franz Xaver Danhuber was a winner of the Hohenzollern.
- Several other aces also served in the unit, including Christian Mesch, Fritz Loerzer, Helmut Lange, Fritz Classen, and Claus Riemer.

== Aircraft ==
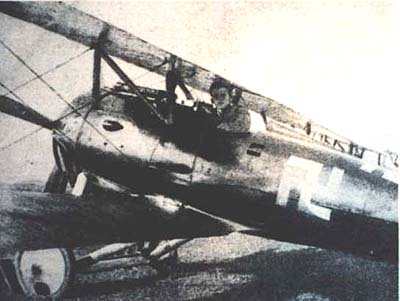
Fritz Beckhardt in his Siemens-Schuckert D.III fighter of Jasta 26; the reversed swastika insignia was a good luck symbol.

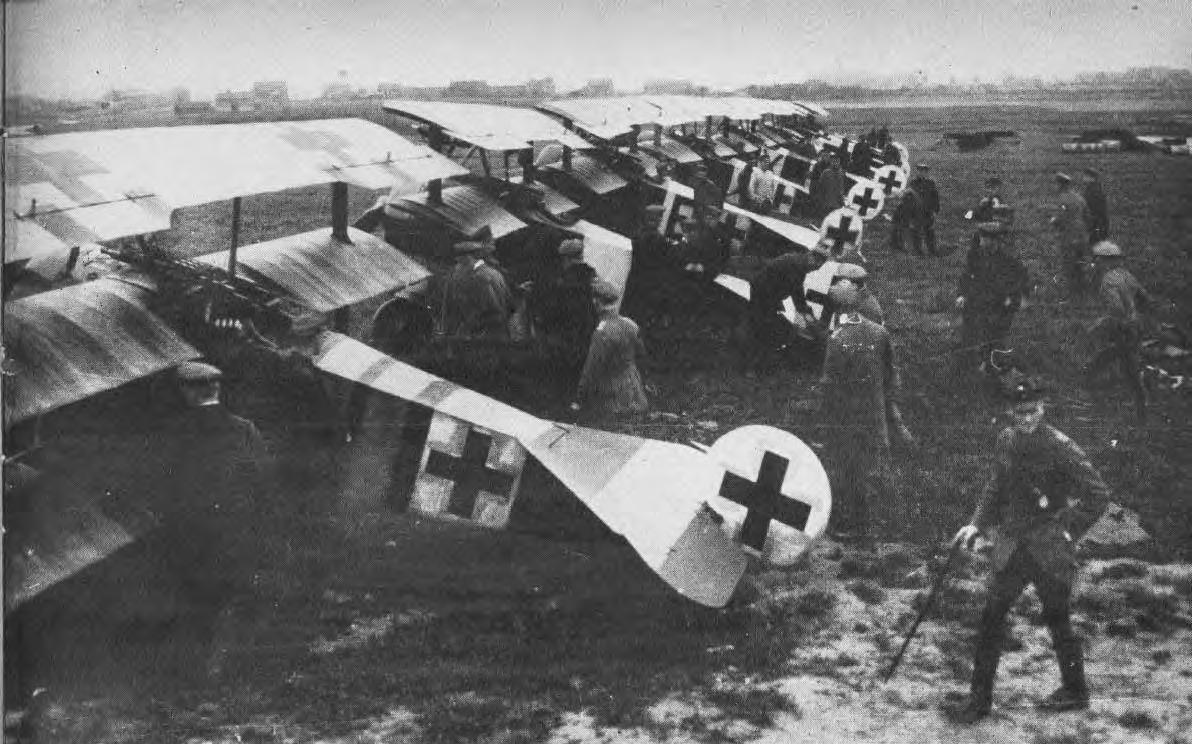
Fokker Dr.Is of Jagdstaffel 26 of the Luftstreitkräfte at Erchin, France.

While few specifics of aircraft usage by Jasta 26 still exist, the following is known about the types assigned to the squadron.

1. The Albatros D.III entered service in January 1917, coincidental with the unit's foundation.
2. The Albatros D.V arrived as a replacement for the Albatros D.III later in 1917.
3. The Fokker Dr.I triplane was brought into service in August 1917. A later consignment arriving in late March 1918 finished the equipage of the unit with triplanes.
4. Fokker D.VIIs were introduced in late April or early May 1918.

As can be seen in the photo, the squadron's stark livery consisted of alternating white and black bands circling fuselage and tail.
