= Hans Henny Jahnn =

German playwright, novelist and organ builder (1894–1959)

Hans Henny Jahnn (born Hans Henny August Jahn; 17 December 1894 – 29 November 1959) was a German playwright, novelist, and organ-builder.

== Personal life ==
Hans Henny Jahnn was born in 1894 in Stellingen, one of Hamburg's suburbs (now a district of Hamburg), and was the grandson of a shipwright. In interviews given to Walter Muschg, at that moment a young literary scholar, Jahnn told that his actual surname should be written "Jann", as his legendary ancestor Jann von Rostock did.

Jahnn's first love was Martha Moeller, a younger sister of his classmate Conrad Moeller, that was the inspiration for many characters of Jahnn's first plays and prose attempts written between 1911 and 1912. In 1909 Jahnn met Gottlieb Friedrich Harms "Friedel" (1893–1931) at a secondary school (the St. Pauli Realschule) which they both attended. As Harms saw Jahnn for the first time, he smiled at him and that became the beginning of their long-life companionship. Since then Harms' ideas deeply influenced Jahnn's view of the world and determined his turn from Christianity to a pagan belief of flesh. Jahnn dreamed of an idillic place – an island where he could live with Harms, his "blood brother", far away from the superstitions and restricting moral of the middle-class society. As a result, in 1913 Jahnn sailed to Amrum, where Harms stayed on Easter vacation, to flee from there to Iceland, a country they believed less touched by civilisation, but in the end they were forced to return home to Germany .

With financial support of Friedrich Lorenz Jürgensen, Jahnn and Harms fled from Germany to Norway in 1915 to avoid enlistment into the army for World War I. This time in Norway was the most productive time in Jahnn's life: during three years spent together with Harms in Norway Jahnn finished two plays, namely "The Wall" ("Die Mauer") and a comedy "Anna Wolter", and started writing a drama "Pastor Ephraim Magnus" and a novel "Ugrino und Ingrabanien". In Norway Jahnn also met a twelve year old girl Signe Christie who remained his one-sided love interest until 1924. Jahnn's passion to Signe Christie and many other details of their relationship served as a source for his modernist novel "Perrudja" (1929).

In 1918 Jahnn met Ellinor Philips who became his wife in 1926. In 1928 Harms married Sybille Philips, Ellinor's sister which technically made Harms Jahnn's brother-in-law. At the beginning of the Nazi period, Jahnn, a committed pacifist, fled Germany to Zürich with his family at the invitation of Walter Muschg and then they moved to Bornholm, an island in Denmark, where Jahnn could once again fulfill a dream of a life far away from the hurly burly of modern civilisation. There he began to work on his chief work, the "River without banks" trilogy ("Fluß ohne Ufer").

Despite Jahnn's long and artistically productive affair with a Hungarian photographer Judit Kárász (together they translated Áron Tamási's novel "Szüzmáriás Királyfi" (in German "Ein Königssohn der Sekler")), he remained with his wife until his death in 1959. Their love letters were published in 2014. Hans Henny Jahnn is buried alongside Harms and Ellinor at Nienstedten Cemetery, Hamburg, Germany.

One of Jahnn's fondest dreams was to build a community of artists that could create a new spiritual reality. In 1919 Jahnn, Harms and a sculptor Franz Buse founded the artistic-utopian community modeled after the medieval Bauhütte (a guild of cathedral builders) and called it "Ugrino" (Glaubensgemeinde Ugrino). When Harms died in 1931 Jahnn designed his gravestone according to the Ugrino rules of burial (each corner of the grave was oriented to the sides of the world).

== Writing ==
As a playwright, he wrote: Pastor Ephraim Magnus (1919), which The Cambridge Guide to Theatre describes as a nihilistic, Expressionist play "stuffed with perversities and sado-masochistic motifs"; Coronation of Richard III (1921; "equally lurid"); and a version of Medea (1926). Later works include the novel Perrudja, an unfinished trilogy of novels River without Banks (Fluss ohne Ufer), the drama Thomas Chatterton (1955; staged by Gustaf Gründgens in 1956), and the novella The Night of Lead. Erwin Piscator staged Jahnn's The Dusty Rainbow (Der staubige Regenbogen) in 1961. His work was awarded the Kleist Prize.

Jahnn's drastic writings were strongly criticized during his lifetime for the unconventional themes such as incest, uncontrolled violence and interest in flesh. His polymorphous eroticism was the object of Julius Bab's review on "Pastor Ephraim Magnus" where he called Jahnn medically insane. Despite protection of Bertolt Brecht, Arnolt Bronnen and Oskar Loerke, Bab's review destroyed Jahnn's reputation, so that in his late years Jahnn regretted having written "Pastor Ephraim Magnus".

Jahnn was also a music publisher, focusing on 17th-century organ music. He was a contemporary of organ-builder Rudolf von Beckerath.

== Selected bibliography ==
=== Prose ===
- Ugrino und Ingrabanien (1922, published posthumously in 1968)
- Perrudja (1929). Trans. Adam Siegel (forthcoming)
- Fluß ohne Ufer. Roman in drei Teilen (1949–61). Shoreless River or River Without Banks: Novel in Three Parts
  - Das Holzschiff (1949). The Ship, trans. Catherine Hutter (1961)
  - Die Niederschrift des Gustav Anias Horn (1949/50)
  - Epilog (posthumous, 1961)
- 13 nicht geheure Geschichten (1954). Thirteen Uncanny Stories, trans. Gerda Jordan (1984). Includes:
  - Ragna and Nils (from Perrudja)
  - The Slave's Story (from Perrudja)
  - The Watchmaker (from Die Niederschrift des Gustav Anias Horn)
  - Sassanidian King (from Perrudja)
  - The Gardener (from Die Niederschrift des Gustav Anias Horn)
  - The Story of the Twins (from Perrudja)
  - A Boy Weeps (from Perrudja)
  - Kebad Kenya (from Das Holzschiff)
  - The Marmalade Eaters (from Perrudja)
  - Mov (included in Fluß ohne Ufer. Epilog)
  - A Master Selects His Servant (from Die Niederschrift des Gustav Anias Horn)
  - The Diver (from Die Niederschrift des Gustav Anias Horn)
  - Stolen Horses (from Die Niederschrift des Gustav Anias Horn)
- Die Nacht aus Blei (1956). The Night of Lead, trans. Malcolm Green (1994)
- Ugrino und Ingrabanien (1968). Unfinished early novel
- Jeden ereilt es (1968). Unfinished novel, partially translated as Bath House by Adam Siegel (2015)
- The Living Are Few, the Dead Many: Selected Works of Hans Henny Jahnn (2012). Translations by Malcolm Green. Includes:
  - Kebad Kenya
  - Sassanid King
  - A Master Selects His Servant
  - The Night of Lead

=== Plays ===
- Pastor Ephraim Magnus (1919)
- Die Krönung Richards III (1921)
- Der Arzt / Sein Weib / Sein Sohn (1922)
- Der gestohlene Gott (1924)
- Medea (1926)
- Neuer Lübecker Totentanz (1931)
- Straßenecke (1931)
- Armut, Reichtum, Mensch und Tier (1933)
- Spur des dunklen Engels (1952)
- Thomas Chatterton (1955)

== Sources ==
- Banham, Martin, ed. (1998). "Jahnn, Hans Henny". The Cambridge Guide to Theatre. Cambridge: Cambridge University Press. p. 553. ISBN 0-521-43437-8.
- "Jahnn, Hans Henny". The Columbia Electronic Encyclopedia. Infoplease. 1994.
- Freeman, Thomas P. (1986). Hans Henny Jahnn. Eine Biographie. Hamburg: Hoffmann und Campe. ISBN 3-455-08608-X.
- Freeman, Thomas P. (2001). The Case of Hans Henny Jahnn: Criticism and the Literary Outsider. Suffolk, UK: Boydell & Brewer. ISBN 1-57113-206-6.
- Jenkinson, David Edward (1969). A Critical Analysis of the Novels of Hans Henny Jahnn (Ph.D.). Department of English, King's College, University of London. OCLC 874233633.
- Jenkinson, David Edward (July 1972). "The Role of Vitalism in the Novels of Hans Henny Jahnn". German Life and Letters. 25 (4): 359–368. doi:10.1111/j.1468-0483.1972.tb00795.x.
