= Otto Fruhner =

German World War I flying ace

- Born: 6 September 1893; Brieg, Silesia (present-day Poland)
- Died: 19 June 1965 (aged 71); Villach, Austria
- Military career
- Allegiance: Germany
- Branch: Air Service
- Service years: 1914 – c. 1918; 1935 – c. 1945
- Rank: Generalmajor
- Units: Feldflieger Abteilung (Field Flier Detachment) 4; Flieger-Abteilung (Flier Detachment) 51; Flieger-Abteilung 20; Jagdstaffel 26 (Fighter Squadron) 26
- Awards: Military Merit Cross, Iron Cross
- Other work: Generalmajor in Luftwaffe during World War II

Generalmajor Otto Fruhner (6 September 1893 – 19 June 1965) MMC, IC, was a German World War I flying ace credited with 27 victories. He was one of the first aviators to parachute from a stricken aircraft.

Beginning as an enlisted mechanic in late 1914, Fruhner rose into the officer's ranks. He was eligible for Germany's highest officer's decoration for valor, the Pour le Mérite, when Kaiser Wilhelm II's abdication scotched the award and the German military largely disbanded after its defeat.

Fruhner would return to his nation's service to join the nascent Luftwaffe as a Major in 1935. He would serve in various training commands throughout World War II, rising to become a Generalmajor.

== Early life and service ==
Otto Fruhner was born on 6 September 1893. He was born in Brieg, Germany (now Brzeg, Poland). Frunhner began his military career as an aviation mechanic on 14 November 1914 for Feldflieger Abteilung (Field Flier Detachment) 4.

== Aerial service ==
He then underwent pilot training, and beginning in June 1916, flew as an enlisted pilot of two seater aircraft for Flieger-Abteilung (Flier Detachment) 51 on the Eastern Front against the Russians. In August, he received the Iron Cross Second Class and was promoted to Unteroffizier.

He then volunteered for fighter duty in July 1917, and was assigned to Jagdstaffel 26, commanded by Bruno Loerzer. Fruhner's combat successes began when he was serving in Jagdstaffel 26. He shot down two Sopwiths in two separate engagements on 3 September 1917.

There was a four month lapse. Then, on 3 January 1918, he scored for the third time, and continued his success through until March, with his ninth victory on 26 March. On 3 June, he received the First Class Iron Cross. At the same time, he was awarded the Prussian Military Merit Cross, the highest award for valor available to enlisted men in the German military.

On 1 July, he downed his tenth victim to become a double ace. From that point on, he accrued victories until 4 September 1918, when he shot down three Sopwith Camels from No. 70 Squadron RAF as his share of the eight losses by the British; this dogfight was the largest loss of fighters ever suffered by the RAF in a single engagement in World War I.

Fruhner was subsequently commissioned a Leutnant. He was also proposed for the Pour le Mérite, the German military's highest award for bravery by officers. There were only five German aces who won both awards. However, the Kaiser abdicated before approving the award.

On 20 September 1918, while in a dogfight with Sopwith Camels of No. 203 Squadron RAF, he collided with one of them. Although injured, he leapt from his irreparably damaged aircraft and parachuted to safety. The Camel he had collided with also crashed; it was credited as Fruhner's 27th victory. After this, Fruhner was withdrawn from combat duty.

== Post World War I service ==
In 1935, Fruhner joined the Luftwaffe as a major commanding a flying school. He later rose in rank in the Luftwaffe during World War II. Remaining in training commands, he eventually attained the rank of Generalmajor (major general).

Otto Fruhner died in Villach, Austria, on 19 June 1965.
