= Julius Buckler =

German First World War flying ace (1894-1960)

- Buckler in 1918
- Born: 28 March 1894; Mainz-Mombach
- Died: 23 May 1960 (aged 66); Bonn or Berlin
- Military career
- Allegiance: German Empire
- Branch: Infantry; Luftstreitkräfte
- Service years: 1913–18
- Rank: Leutnant
- Units: Flieger-Abteilung (Artillerie) 209; Fliegerersatz-Abteilung 6; Jagdstaffel 17
- Awards: Pour le Mérite; Golden Military Merit Cross; Iron Cross 1st & 2nd Class; Golden Wound Badge

Julius Buckler (28 March 1894 – 23 May 1960) was a German First World War fighter ace credited with 36 victories during the war. He shot down 29 enemy airplanes and seven observation balloons; two other victories went unconfirmed. He was one of four German fighter aces to win Germany's highest decorations for valor for both enlisted man and officer.

== Early life and service ==
Buckler's father was a roofer, and Buckler followed him into the family trade. At 15 years of age, Buckler had an interest in architecture and worked for Anthony Fokker but left in 1913 to join the Infantry Life Regiment 117. After suffering a bad wound on the Western Front in September 1914, he applied for a transfer to the German Army Air Service (Luftstreitkräfte)

He trained in Flieger-Ersatz-Abteilung 6, and by the summer of 1915 was flying artillery direction missions over Verdun as an aerial observer in Flieger-Abteilung (Artillerie) 209 before training as a pilot. Once he was qualified, Buckler returned to his two-seater unit as a pilot. On 21 March 1916, he was lining up an attack on a French Voisin when a Fokker Eindekker cut in and shot it down. The Eindekker followed Buckler and his observer back to their base; the pilot introduced himself as Oswald Boelcke. Meeting the leading ace of the war evoked Buckler's intense desire to become a fighter pilot.

In November 1916 he transferred to a fighter squadron, Jagdstaffel 17, as a founding member. Just after he joined Jagdstaffel 17, they re-equipped with the Albatros D.II.

== Aerial victories and wounds ==
He scored his initial victory on 17 December 1916, a French Caudron over Bras. He would not score again until 14 February 1918. He then began to pick up single victories throughout Spring and early Summer. On 17 July he scored victory number 11 although he was wounded again and did not score again until 9 August. On 11 August he downed a British RE 8 and was wounded yet again the next day. Victory 14 was on 29 September, possibly because his wound kept him out of action.

On 18 November he was commissioned as a Leutnant. He was wounded for the fourth time on 30 November 1917, wounded in both his arms and chest. His subsequent crash then completely broke both arms. He lay under his smashed aircraft for hours before counter-attacking German infantry overran the wreckage and rescued him. On 4 December 1917, while he was recovering from his wounds, he was awarded the Pour le Mérite. The injuries kept him out of action for months and he would not score again until 16 April 1918.

After recovering, he rejoined Jagdstaffel 17. At this time he had two airplanes dedicated for his personal use. He dubbed them Mops and Lilly. He flew "Mops" and "Lilly" to score three more victories before he was severely wounded yet again on 6 May 1918, this time in the left ankle. His next victory came five months later on 5 October. He scored twice more in the final days of the war, and had his second unconfirmed triumph on 8 November.

== Postwar ==
In 1939, Buckler wrote his memoirs, entitled "Malaula! Der Kampfruf meiner Staffel (Malaula! The Battle Cry of my Squadron)"

He survived World War II and died on 23 May 1960, in either Berlin or Bonn.

== Decorations and awards ==
- Prussian Pilot's Badge
- Iron Cross of 1914, 1st and 2nd class
- Ehrenbecher für den Sieger im Luftkampf (24 December 1916)
- Warrior Decoration in Iron (Hesse)
- Gold Military Merit Cross (Prussia) (12 November 1917)
- Knights Cross with Swords of the House Order of Hohenzollern
- Pour le Mérite (4 December 1917)
- Wound Badge (1918) in Gold
- The Honour Cross of the World War 1914/1918

== Notes ==
- It is believed that Buckler is the only German ace to receive the Golden Wound Badge. During World War I, this award in Gold was made only for permanently disabling or disfiguring wounds.
