= Christian Donhauser =

German World War I flying ace

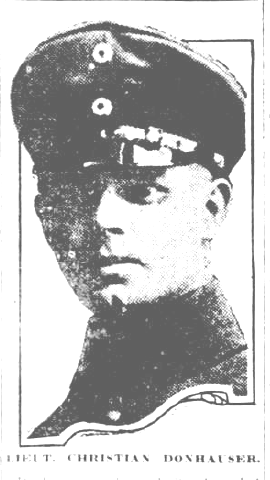
- 200px
- Born: 9 September 1894; Harburg, Germany
- Died: 13 January 1919 (aged 24); Coblenz, Germany
- Military career
- Allegiance: German Empire
- Branch: Luftstreitkräfte
- Rank: Leutnant
- Units: Flieger-Abteilung 10; Jagdstaffel 17
- Awards: Military Merit Cross; Iron Cross

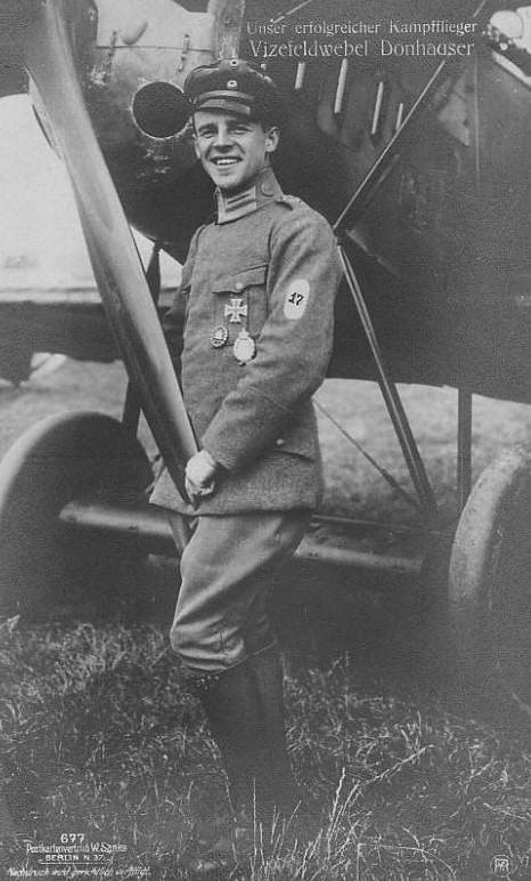
Christian Donhauser

Leutnant Hans Christian Friedrich Donhauser (9 September 1894 – 13 January 1919) was a German World War I flying ace credited with 19 aerial victories.

== Early life ==
Hans Christian Friedrich Donhauser was born in Harburg on 9 September 1894. He preferred use of the first name Christian.

== World War I aerial service ==
Donhauser began his flying career as a pilot in a photo reconnaissance and artillery direction unit, Feldflieger Abteilung (Field Flier Detachment) 10. He scored his first victory on 18 May 1918, while he was flying artillery spotting missions. On 13 June 1918, he received the Iron Cross First Class after being wounded in action. He then volunteered to fly fighter aircraft and underwent training at Jastaschule (fighter school) No. 1. After his graduation and posting to Jasta 17 as a Feldwebel in July 1918, he rapidly ran up a score. His second victory was on 20 August 1918; by the end of the month, his count was nine. He won twice more in September, and scored eight triumphs in October, with the last one on 23 October, just over two months after joining the jagdstaffel. On 9 October 1918, he was awarded the Military Merit Cross, which was the highest Prussian decoration for valor awarded to noncommissioned officers. At war's end, Donhauser was in the first detachment of German pilots to surrender their aircraft.

== Postwar life ==
On 30 December 1918, Donhauser was the subject of an article in the New York Times. It noted that he claimed to have shot down and killed Quentin Roosevelt, President Theodore Roosevelt's son. It also stated that at 94 pounds, he was the smallest aviator in the German air force.

Donhauser remained in military service in the diminished postwar Reichswehr. He was promoted to the officer's ranks as a Leutnant. While visiting Coblenz, he died in an airplane crash on 13 January 1919.
