= Helmut Lange =

German World War I flying ace (d. 1918)

- Died: After 4 November 1918
- Military career
- Allegiance: Germany
- Branch: Aviation
- Rank: Leutnant
- Unit: Jagdstaffel 26
- Awards: Iron Cross

Leutnant Helmut Lange IC was a German World War I flying ace credited with nine aerial victories.

== World War I ==
Helmut Lange served in Jagdstaffel 26 during World War I. He scored nine aerial victories there, under the leadership of Bruno Loerzer and Franz Brandt. Lange temporarily commanded the squadron from 22 August through 12 September 1918.

== List of aerial victories ==
See also Aerial victory standards of World War I

No.	Date/time	Aircraft	Foe	Result	Location	Notes
1	26 March 1918 @ 1730 hours		Sopwith Dolphin		St.-Pierre	No. 19 Squadron RFC casualty
2	8 May 1918 @ 0945 hours		Royal Aircraft Factory SE.5a		South of Zillebeke Lake	No. 74 Squadron RAF casualty
3	31 May 1918 @ 1705 hours		Spad		Southwest of Longpont	
4	27 August 1918 @ 0840 hours		Sopwith Camel		Croisilles, Pas-de-Calais	
5	2 September 1918 @ 1015 hours		Royal Aircraft Factory SE.5a		Villers	
6	2 September 1918 @ 1245 hours		Sopwith Camel		Northeast of Barelle	
7	16 September 1918 @ 0850 hours		Bristol F.2 Fighter		Northeast of Quiéry-la-Motte	No. 11 Squadron RAF casualty
8	30 October 1918 @ 1230 hours		Airco DH.9		Crespin	No. 98 Squadron RAF casualty
9	4 November 1918 @ 1015 hours		Bristol F.2 Fighter		Vieux Rengts	No. 48 Squadron RAF casualty

== Post World War I ==
Although Lange almost certainly survived the war, it is not known what became of him.

== Sources ==
- Franks, Norman, Frank W. Bailey, Russell Guest (1993). Above the Lines: The Aces and Fighter Units of the German Air Service, Naval Air Service and Flanders Marine Corps, 1914-1918. Grub Street. ISBN 0-948817-73-9, ISBN 978-0-948817-73-1.
