= Otto Esswein =

- Born: 3 March 1890; Waiblingen, Kingdom of Württemberg, German Empire
- Died: 21 July 1918 (aged 28) near Hartennes-et-Taux, France
- Military career
- Allegiance: German Empire
- Branch: Imperial German Air Service
- Rank: Offizierstellvertreter
- Unit: Jagdstaffel 26
- Awards: Military Merit Cross; Iron Cross First and Second Class; Württemberg's Military Merit Order

Offizierstellvertreter Otto Esswein (3 March 1890 – 21 July 1918) was a German World War I flying ace credited with twelve aerial victories.

== Early life ==
Otto Esswein was born in Waiblingen, in the Kingdom of Württemberg within the German Empire, on 3 March 1890.

== Aviation service ==
Details of Esswein's entry into military service are not available. However, Esswein transferred from ground service to aviation in mid-1915. On 30 October 1917, he was assigned to Jagdstaffel 26. He scored his first victory, shooting down a Sopwith Camel on 15 November. He was then slightly wounded in the right eye on 27 November.

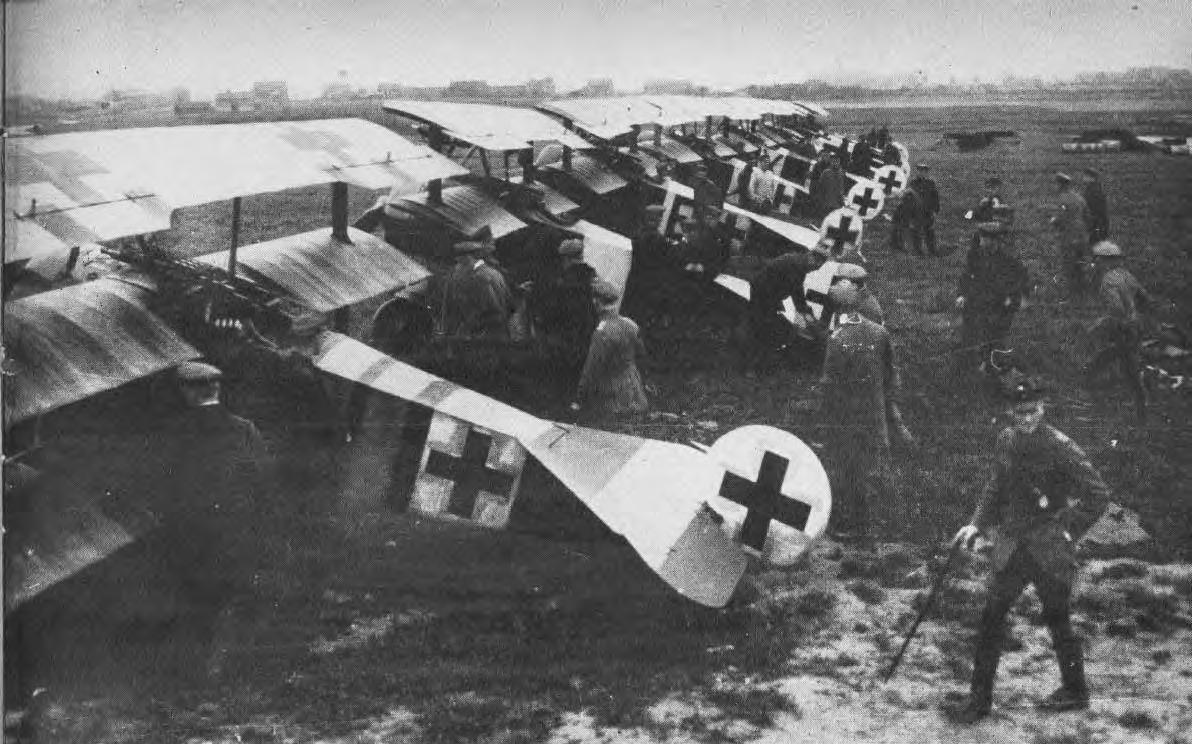
Fokker Dr.Is of Jagdstaffel 26 of the Luftstreitkräfte at Erchin, France.

When he returned to the squadron in early 1918, a new Fokker Dr.I triplane awaited him. He used it to shoot down another Camel on 2 February, three more the next day, and two more British fighters on the 5th, one of which was the Royal Aircraft Factory SE-5 of No. 84 Squadron RFC's Lt. Cyril Ball, brother of English ace Albert Ball. By 26 March 1918, he was a double ace with ten victories. On 31 May, he increased his tally to a dozen with his two last victories. He was awarded the Military Merit Cross on 3 June 1918 to join his Iron Crosses, and later awarded his home kingdom's Military Merit Order. On 16 July, in one of the pioneer usages of a parachute, he successfully bailed out of his burning plane after being shot down attacking a balloon. Five days later he was unable to repeat the feat and was killed in action in another flaming aircraft over Hartennes-et-Taux, France.
