= Hermann Dahlmann =

German aviator (1892–1978)

Theodor Hermann Dahlmann
- Born: 19 November 1892; Wanfried, Hessen, Germany
- Died: 21 January 1978 (aged 85); Rimsting, West Germany
- Military career
- Allegiance: German Empire (1913–1918); Weimar Republic (1918–1920); Nazi Germany (1939–1945)
- Branch: Aviation
- Service years: 1913–1920; 1939–1947
- Rank: Generalleutnant
- Awards: Knight's Cross with Swords of the Royal House Order of Hohenzollern, Cross of Honor, Iron Cross First and Second Class, both the Prussian and Luftwaffe Pilot's Badge, Luftwaffe Long Service Award
- Other work: Ended career managing all ground organization, flight security, and flight operations of the Luftwaffe during World War II

Generalleutnant Theodor Hermann Dahlmann (19 November 1892 – 21 January 1978), usually referred to as Hermann Dahlmann, was an influential aviation administrator during the Third Reich. His rise to prominence was linked to his World War I experience of knowing both Hermann Göring and Bruno Loerzer.

He began his military career prior to World War I, becoming an officer candidate in October 1913. He first met Göring during 1914. Dahlmann served with ground forces until 25 July 1915, when he transferred to aviation for aerial observer training. He would serve in aviation until war's end, being entrusted by Loerzer with the adjutant's duties for one of the world's first fighter wings, Jagdgeschwader III. Through Loerzer, Dahlmann would come to better know Göring, who was Loerzer's friend.

Dahlmann ended World War I as a decorated fighter ace credited with seven aerial victories. Nevertheless, he did not remain in German military aviation, which had been greatly restricted by the Treaty of Versailles. The decades between the World Wars were spent serving first in police duties, then as a civil servant. By 1 August 1939, when Dahlmann transferred back to aviation by joining the Luftwaffe, he was the civil service equivalent of a colonel. The transfer back to aviation placed Dahlmann under Göring's command, despite the former's private reservations about the latter.

Dahlmann would serve in training and personnel management positions until 8 July 1942. He then became a special assistant to Generalfeldmarshall Erhard Milch. On 1 December 1943, Dahlmann was promoted to generalleutnant and placed in charge of the Luftwaffe's flight security, flight operations, and ground organization. He would serve in this role right through to war's end. He was then imprisoned until August 1947.

== Early life ==
Theodor Hermann Dahlmann was born on 19 November 1892 in Wanfried, Eschwege District, Germany to Christoph Dahlmann (a lawyer and notary, born 25 March 1861) and Caroline Dahlmann (née Schwaner, born 6 May 1865). In later years, he would be known as simply Hermann Dahlmann.

Hermann Dahlmann joined the German Army by becoming an officer candidate, being appointed as a Fahnrich and platoon leader in the 82nd Infantry Regiment on 15 October 1913. He was detached to the War School at Anklam on 1 November 1913.

== World War I ==
Dahlmann returned to the 82nd Regiment and was promoted to Leutnant on 1 August 1914. He went on convalescent leave on 25 September 1914. On 28 October 1914, he began service with the Fortress Machine Gun Battalion Borkum. Dahlmann first met Hermann Göring, under whom he would serve in the Third Reich, sometime in 1914.

On 21 May 1915, Dahlmann moved to the Replacement Machine Gun Battalion of the XI Armee Corps Kassel. From there, he was detached to aviation training with Fliegerersatz-Abteilung 3 at Gotha on 25 July 1915. He then moved to Cologne to take aerial observer training with the Fliegerersatz-Abteilung 7, beginning 15 August 1915. Rather unusually, he returned to Gotha for pilot's training on 20 September 1915. On 10 May 1916, he was assigned to Białystok. On 15 June 1916, he was assigned to Feldflieger Abteilung 63 to fly reconnaissance duty in two-seater airplanes. On 15 November 1916 he transferred to Flieger-Abteilung (Artillerie) 252; this unit's duties included artillery fire direction as well as reconnaissance.

He then moved up to flying single-seater scouts; from 15 March to 19 October 1917, he was posted to a fighter squadron, Jagdstaffel 29. On 1 June 1917, he became a balloon buster by downing an enemy observation balloon for his first aerial victory. On 20 October 1917, he was removed from combat and stationed at the Armee Flight Park in Wilna. On 15 November he began leadership duties in training new aviators, first at Bromberg, then at Graudenz. He was promoted to oberleutnant on 27 January 1918.

Dahlmann returned to front line duty on 25 May 1918, being assigned to Jagdgeschwader III to serve under Bruno Loerzer; on 15 August, he became JG III's adjutant. He scored his second aerial victory on 14 August while flying with Jagdstaffel 26. After becoming adjutant, he continued to fly with Jasta 26 and scored five more victories, which were credited to the wing. Loerzer followed a similar pattern, having been Jasta 26's Staffelführer before succeeding to command of JG III.

The Fokker D.VIIs in use by both Dahlmann and Loerzer during September 1918 bore similar striking white and black patterns. In Dahlmann's case, that meant a black cowling leading the way, with wide black and white bands alternating around the fuselage. An abstract diving hawk was emblazoned in black on the white band circling the fuselage just behind the cockpit. The more usual Iron Cross national marking had been stylized into a + sign cross in black on the next white band aft of the hawk, as well as painted black on white on the Fokker's vertical stabilizer.

Dahlmann served as the wing's adjutant until the end of the war, not giving up the position until 19 November 1918. The experience left him with definite opinions about Hermann Göring, although Dahlmann would express those opinions only in later years. According to Dahlmann, Goering received the Pour le Merite on 2 June 1918 with only 18 victories because Loerzer lobbied the high command on Göring's behalf. It seems that Loerzer and Göring were old friends, having served together in the same infantry regiment, and as a reconnaissance air crew from October 1914 to June 1915, as well as serving together in Jasta 26 from February through May 1917. According to Dahlmann, the premature award, as well as Göring's arrogance, made him an unpopular commander with his men.

== Between the World Wars ==
After Dahlmann's duties as adjutant of JG III ended 19 November 1918, he was assigned back to FEA 3 at Gotha for demobilization. On 1 February 1919 he became adjutant of the aerodrome there. He transitioned to police service in Berlin on 15 July 1919, serving in various command positions, including that of the air police, until transferring into civil service. During this time, he became a police oberleutnant on 2 April 1920 and was promoted to hauptmann on 20 May 1921.

His civil service employment saw him increasingly involved in aviation administration until the beginning of World War II. He was promoted thrice, becoming the civil service equivalent of a colonel on 28 July 1934. He transferred to the Luftwaffe as the Department Chief of the Reichsluftfahrtministerium (Air Ministry) on 1 August 1939, thus placing himself under Göring's command.

== World War II and beyond ==
On 3 November 1939, his responsibilities changed, as he became responsible for both pilot training and the air base at Danzig. From this personnel management position, he would transfer into four different commandant slots for commanding airports or regions of airports. On 1 December 1941, during the last of these commandant positions, he was promoted to Generalmajor.

From 8 July 1942 through 30 November 1943, he served as a special assistant to Generalfeldmarshall Erhard Milch. On 1 December 1943 Dahlmann was promoted to generalleutnant and entrusted with the flight security, flight operations, and ground organization of the Luftwaffe. He served in that capacity until 8 May 1945, VE Day, when he was captured. He would not be released until August 1947.

Dahlmann died on 21 January 1978, in Rimsteig, Germany aged 85.

== Bibliography ==
- Above the Lines: The Aces and Fighter Units of the German Air Service, Naval Air Service and Flanders Marine Corps, 1914-1918. Norman Franks, Frank W. Bailey, Russell Guest. Grub Street, 1993. ISBN 0-948817-73-9, ISBN 978-0-948817-73-1.
- Fokker D.VII Aces of World War I, Norman Franks. Osprey Publishing, 2003. ISBN 1-84176-533-3, ISBN 978-1-84176-533-4.
- Goering: The Rise and Fall of the Notorious Nazi Leader. Roger Manvell, Heinrich Fraenkel. Skyhorse Publishing Inc., 2011. ISBN 1-61608-109-0, ISBN 978-1-61608-109-6.
