= Bruno Loerzer =

German air force officer (1891–1960)

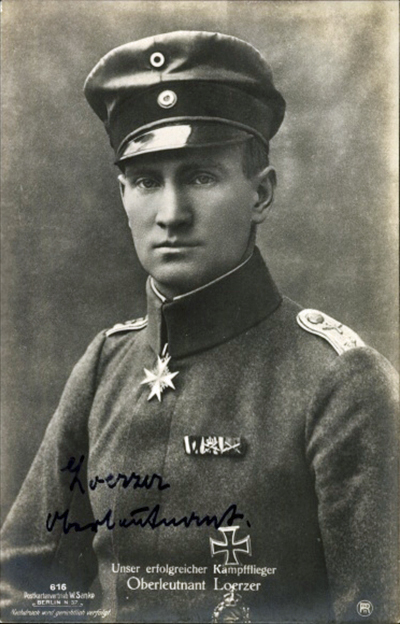
- Loerzer in 1918
- Born: 22 January 1891; Berlin, German Empire
- Died: 23 August 1960 (aged 69) Hamburg, West Germany
- Buried: Nienstedten Cemetery
- Allegiance: German Empire; Nazi Germany
- Branch: Luftstreitkräfte; Luftwaffe
- Service years: 1911–1920; 1935–1945
- Rank: Generaloberst
- Wars: World War I; World War II
- Awards: Pour le Mérite; Knight's Cross of the Iron Cross

Bruno Loerzer (22 January 1891 – 23 August 1960) was a German air force officer during World War I and World War II. Credited with 44 aerial victories during World War I, he was one of Germany's leading flying aces, as well as commander of one of the first Imperial German Air Service Jagdeschwaders.

Loerzer's close friendship with Hermann Göring led to Loerzer's service in the World War II Luftwaffe, with subsequent promotion to Generaloberst by the war's end. Göring described Loerzer as "his laziest general", but swept aside criticisms of him, commenting, "I need someone I can drink a bottle of red wine with in the evening."

== Career ==
Loerzer was born on 22 January 1891 in Friedenau, a locality in Berlin, the capital of the German Empire.

=== World War I ===
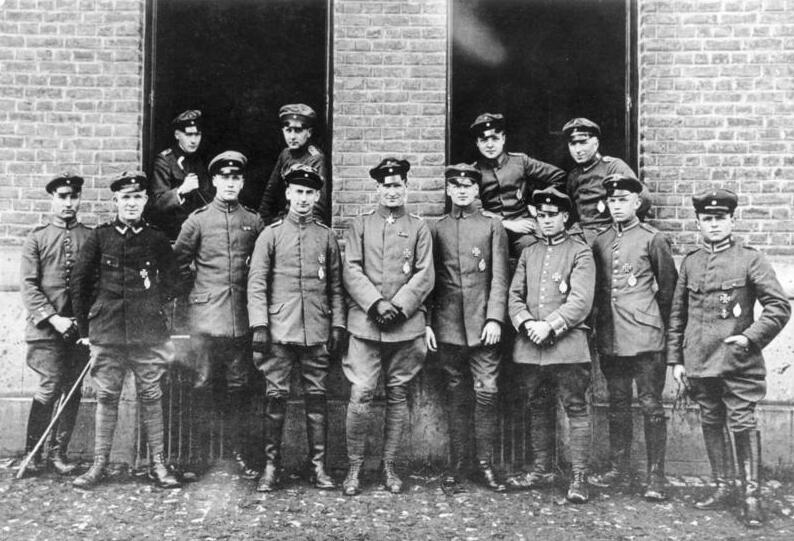
May 1918 members of "Jasta" 26: Loerzer is in the middle; at far right Fritz Beckhardt

Born in Berlin, Loerzer was a prewar army officer who learned to fly in 1914. Hermann Göring flew as Loerzer's observer from 28 October 1914 until late June 1915. Transferring to fighters, Loerzer flew with two Jagdstaffeln in 1916. On 18 January 1917, he was appointed leader of the newly formed Jagdstaffel 26. By then, he had scored two victories over French aircraft. He had his aircraft painted distinctively striped in black and white. As his victory score mounted, he was awarded the Iron Cross First Class and House Order of Hohenzollern. In November 1917, he and his squadron mate Göring each had 15 kills, and both still coveted the highest Prussian decoration - the blue enamel cross of the Pour le Mérite. Thirty years later, Loerzer would snicker to colleagues that Göring had inflated his mission claims. "Do the same," Loerzer claimed Göring had urged him, "otherwise we'll never get ahead!" (Note: In fact Goerings claims were a modest 22 [half of Loezer claims] See "Under the Guns of the German Aces") His tally reached 20 victories at the end of October, and he received the Pour le Mérite in February 1918.

The same month, he took command of the newly formed Jagdgeschwader III, the third of Germany's famed "flying circuses." His aces included his brother Fritz, who claimed 11 victories. Leading Jasta 26 and three other squadrons, with Hermann Dahlmann's support as adjutant and wingman, Loerzer proved a successful wing commander. Equipped with the new BMW-engined Fokker D.VII, JG III cut a wide swath through Allied formations in the summer of 1918, and his own score mounted steadily. He achieved his last ten victories in September when he reached his final score of 44 victories. Shortly before the armistice, he was promoted to Hauptmann (captain).

=== Between the world wars ===
Loerzer irregularly fought with Freikorps anti-communist paramilitary units from December 1918 until March 1920. He commanded FA 427 in the Baltic area, supporting the Eiserne Division in the tactical air role. During the 1930s, he was a leader in various civil aviation organisations (National Socialist Flying Corps: NSFK), and rejoined the Luftwaffe in 1935 with the rank of Oberst (colonel).

On 15 March 1937, Loerzer was tasked with the creation of Jagdgeschwader 334 (JG 334—334th Fighter Wing) and appointed its first Geschwaderkommodore (wing commander). (Note: On 1 November 1938, JG 334 was renamed to Jagdgeschwader 133 which then became Jagdgeschwader 53 on 1 May 1939.) He held this position until 31 March 1938 when he was appointed Inspekteur der Jagdflieger (Inspector of Fighters). Command of JG 334 was then passed on to Oberstleutnant Werner Junck.

=== World War II ===
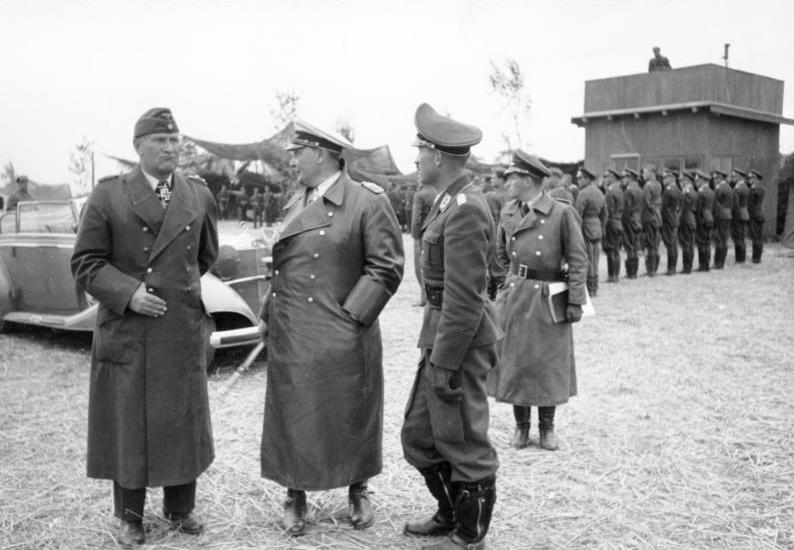
Bruno Loerzer (left), Adolf Galland (right) and Hermann Göring (centre), France, September 1940

During the early war years, he was commander of II Air Corps, being awarded the Knight's Cross of the Iron Cross in May 1940. His II Air Corps participated in the invasion of the Soviet Union in the summer of 1941, as a section of Kesselring's 2nd Air Fleet—in support of Field Marshal von Bock. His unit was transferred to Messina, Sicily, in October 1941, and he remained there until the middle of 1943, when his section returned to the Italian mainland after suffering heavy losses.

In December 1942, bomber ace Werner Baumbach, Group Commander of III./Kampfgeschwader 30, wrote a letter to Hans Jeschonnek, then Chief of the General Staff of the Luftwaffe, regarding the heavy losses suffered by the II Air Corps under Loerzer's leadership. Loerzer was removed from command of the II Air Corps in February 1943, and subsequently promoted by Goering to Generaloberst as Chief of the Luftwaffe Personnel Department and Chief of Personnel Armament and National Socialist Leadership of the Luftwaffe. Loerzer showed his gratitude on the occasion of the Reichsmarshall's birthday in January 1944, where he presented Göring with a carload of black market goods from Italy - women's stockings, soaps, and other rare items, complete with a price list in order to keep black market prices uniform throughout Germany.

In December 1944, he was assigned to the Führerreserve. He retired in April 1945, and was captured by the Americans in May 1945, and held until 1948.

=== Post-war ===
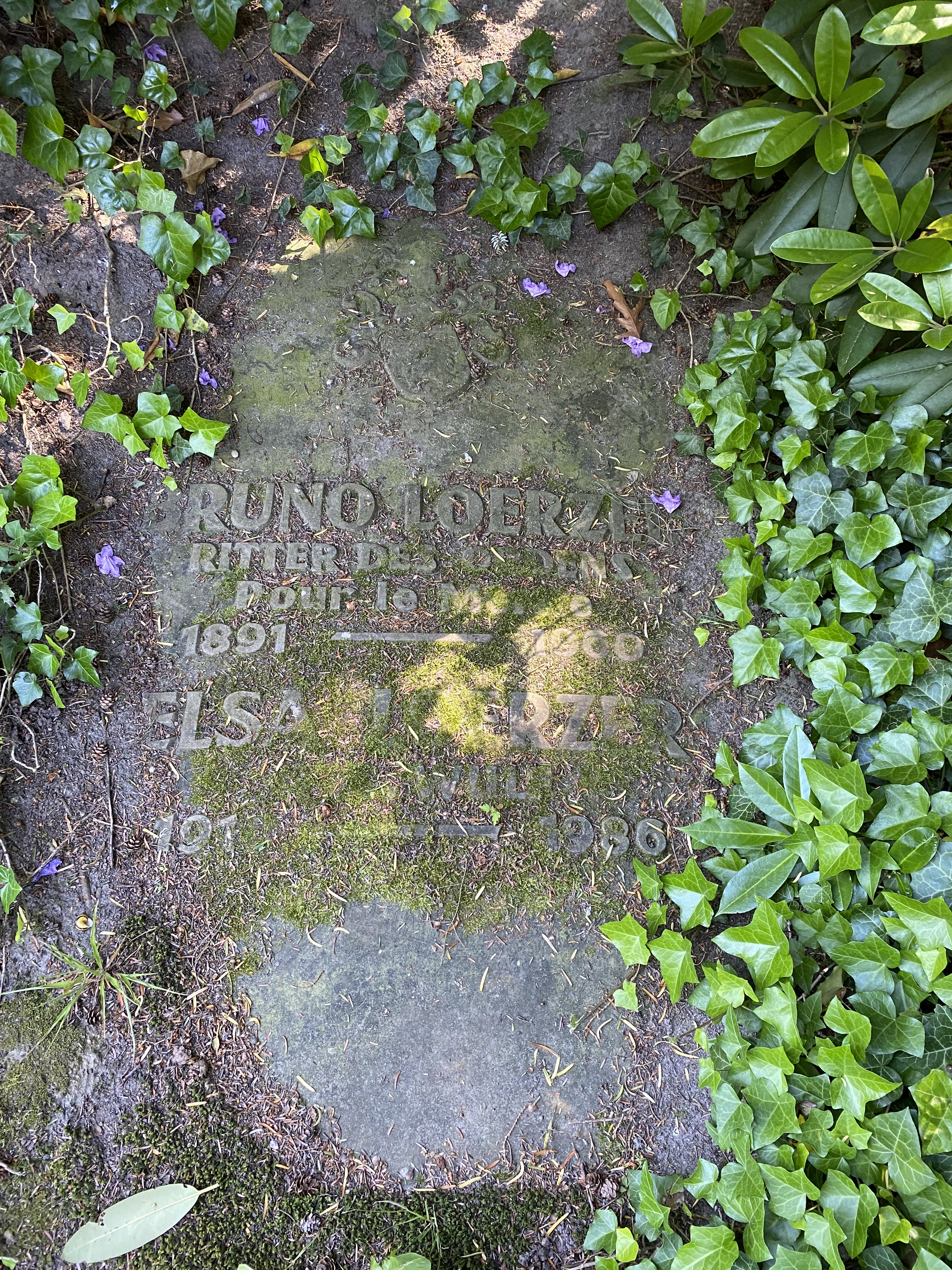
Grave at the Nienstedten Cemetery

Loerzer died in Hamburg in 1960, at the age of 69.

== Awards ==
- Iron Cross (1914)
  - 2nd Class: 7 March 1915
  - 1st Class: late 1917
- Knight's Cross Second Class of the Order of the Zähringer Lion with Swords: award date unknown
- Military Karl-Friedrich Merit Order, Knights Cross: award date unknown
- Knight's Cross of the Royal House Order of Hohenzollern with Swords: late 1917
- Pour le Mérite: 12 February 1918 as Oberleutnant and leader of Jagdstaffel 26
- Iron Cross (1939)
  - 2nd Class: unknown award date
  - 1st Class: 14 September 1939
- Knight's Cross of the Iron Cross: 29 May 1940 as Generalleutnant and commanding general of the II. Fliegerkorps.

== Notes ==
Military offices
Preceded by none	Commander of Jagdgeschwader 334; 15 July 1937 – 31 March 1938	Succeeded by Oberstleutnant Werner Junck
Preceded by none	Inspekteur der Jagdflieger; 1 April 1938 – 31 January 1939	Succeeded by Oberst Werner Junck
Preceded by General Wilhelm Wimmer	Commander of 2. Flieger-Division (1938-1939); 1 February 1939 – 11 October 1939	Succeeded by II. Fliegerkorps
Preceded by: 2. Flieger-Division	Commander of II. Fliegerkorps; 11 October 1939 – 23 February 1943	Succeeded by Generalleutnant Martin Harlinghausen
Preceded by Gustav Kastner-Kirdorf	Chief of the Luftwaffe Personnel Office; 23 March 1943 – 22 December 1944	Succeeded by Rudolf Meister
