= Nienstedten Cemetery =

Cemetery in Hamburg, Germany

Coordinates: 53.5542°N 9.8417°E

Nienstedtener Friedhof
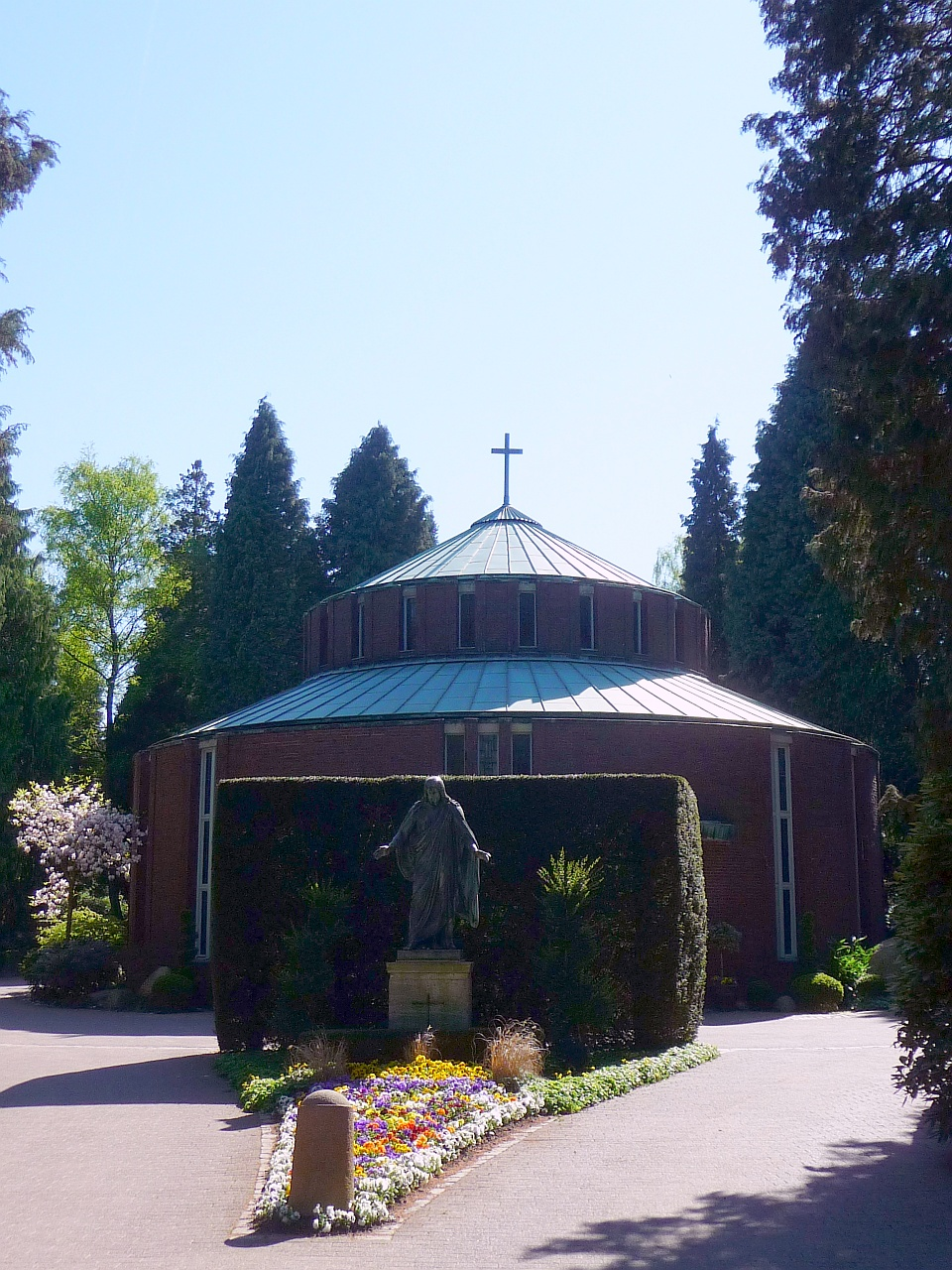
- The cemetery chapel
- Interactive map of Nienstedtener Friedhof

Details
- Established: 1840
- Location: Hamburg
- Country: Germany
- Type: Protestant cemetery
- Owned by: Nienstedten Evangelical Lutheran parish
- Size: 10.5 ha (26 acres)
- Website: Official website
- Find a Grave: Nienstedtener Friedhof

The Lutheran Nienstedten Cemetery (German: Nienstedtener Friedhof) is a church-operated historic burial ground in Hamburg, Germany. The cemetery is owned by the Evangelical Lutheran parish church of Nienstedten, Hamburg. The cemetery is located on the Elbchaussee near the parish church in Nienstedten, now a Hamburg suburb. It is one of the oldest cemeteries still in operation in the Greater Hamburg area with around 250 burials taking place each year.

== History and description ==
The old cemetery was established in 1814. The cemetery has a size of 10.5 hectares after several expansions. A total of 11 extensions took place between 1836 and 1975. The most important requirement for the purchase of a grave is being a member of the Evangelical Lutheran Church.

== Selected notable burials ==
Notable people buried here include:

- Caspar Voght (1752–1839), merchant and social reformer
- Bernhard von Bülow (1849–1929), statesman who served as Secretary of State for Foreign Affairs
- Paul Nevermann (1902–1979), politician, member of the Social Democratic Party (SPD) and First Mayor of Hamburg
- Hans Henny Jahnn (1894–1959), playwright, novelist, and organ-builder
- Siegfried Lenz (1926–2014), writer
- Bernhard von Bülow (1849–1929), statesman
- Bruno Loerzer (1891–1960), Luftwaffe general

== Gallery ==
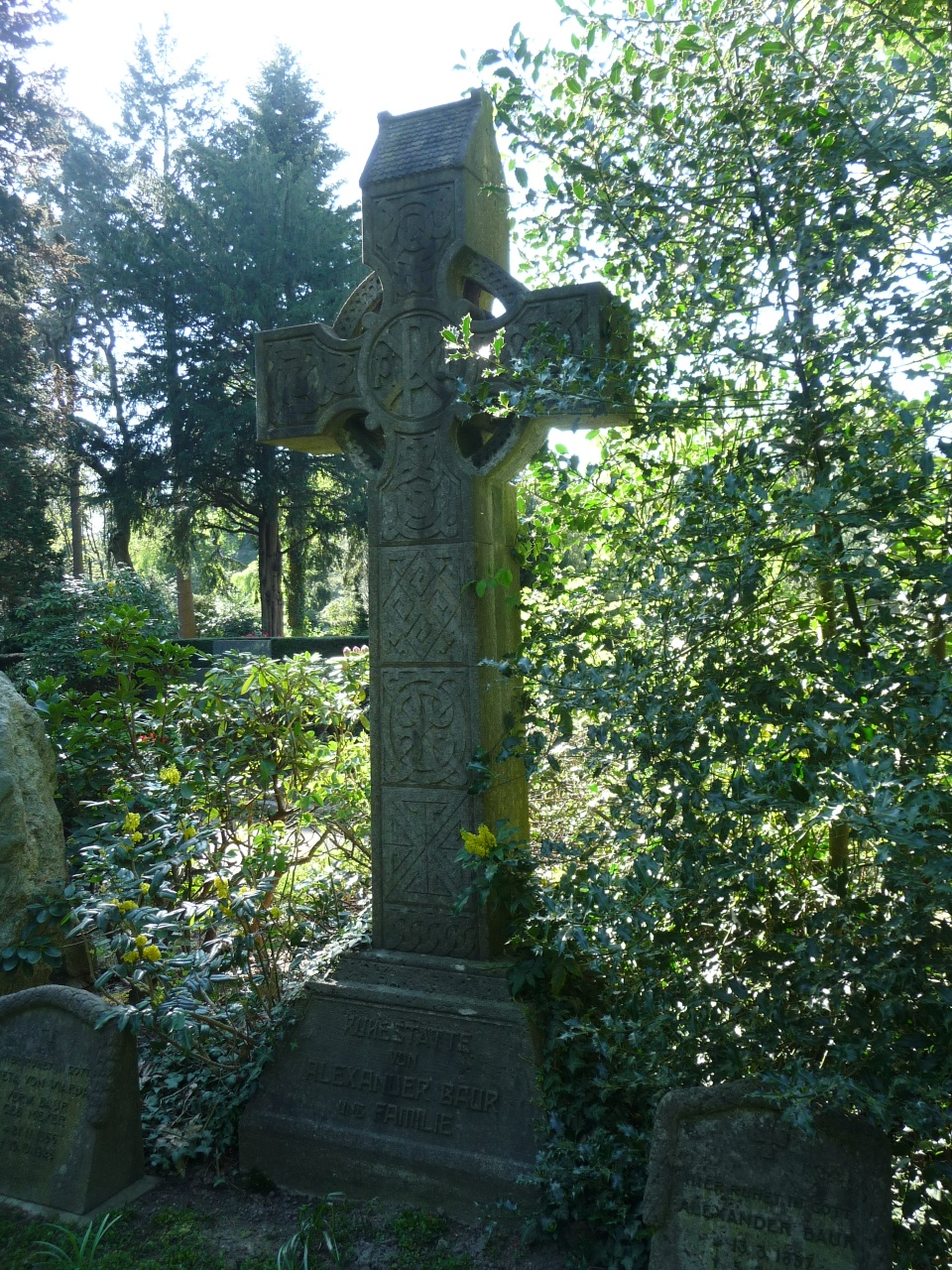

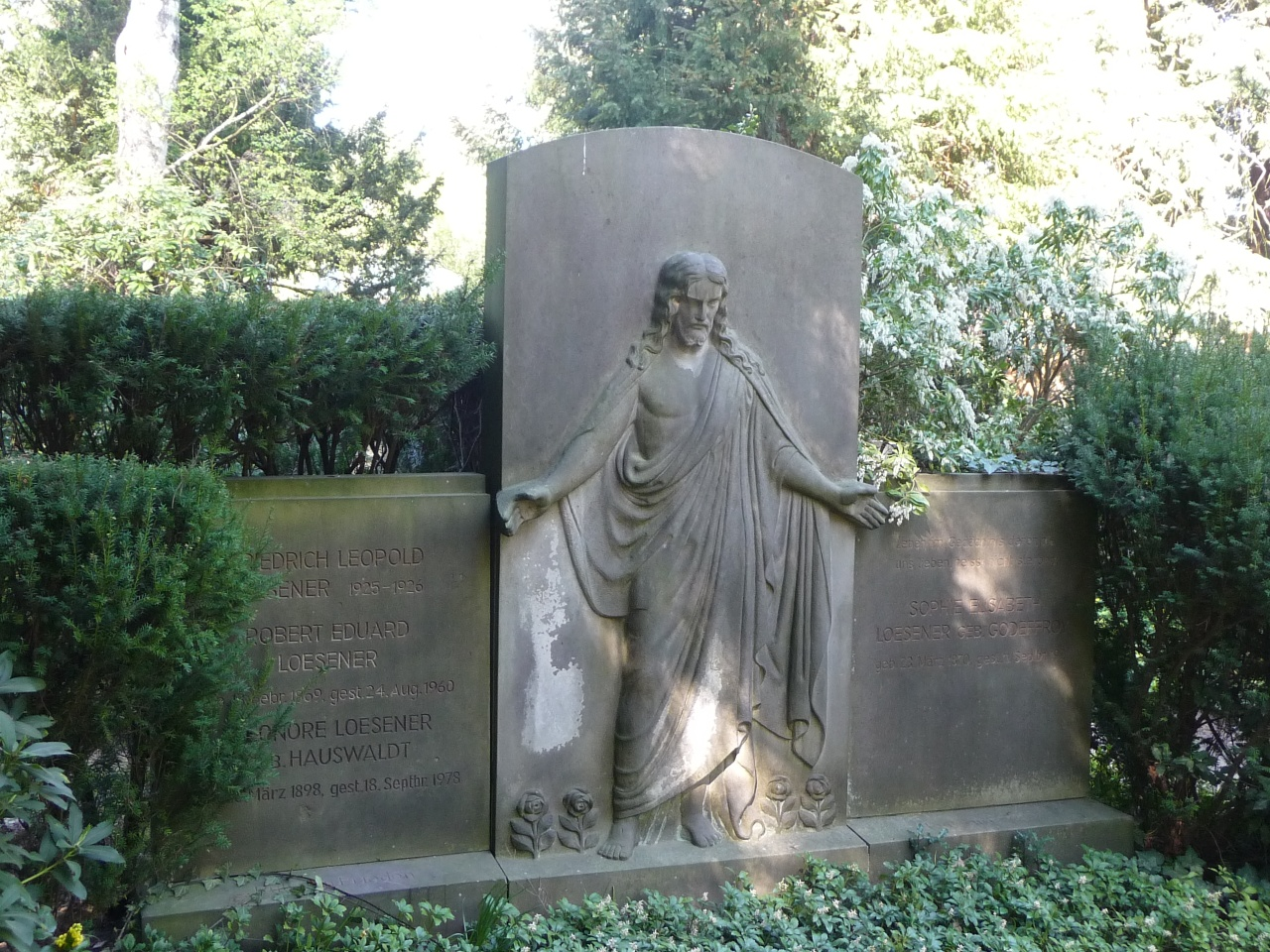

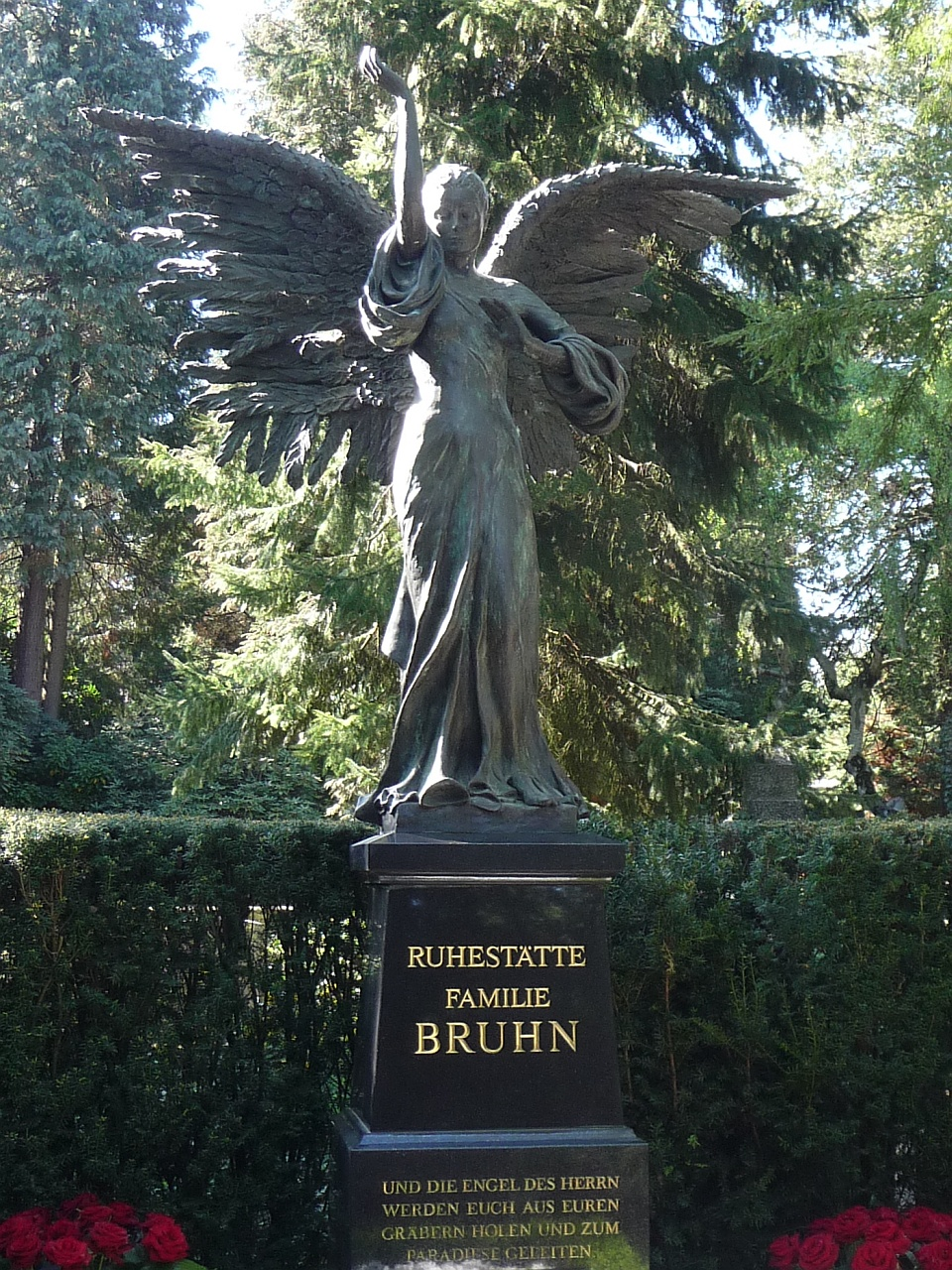

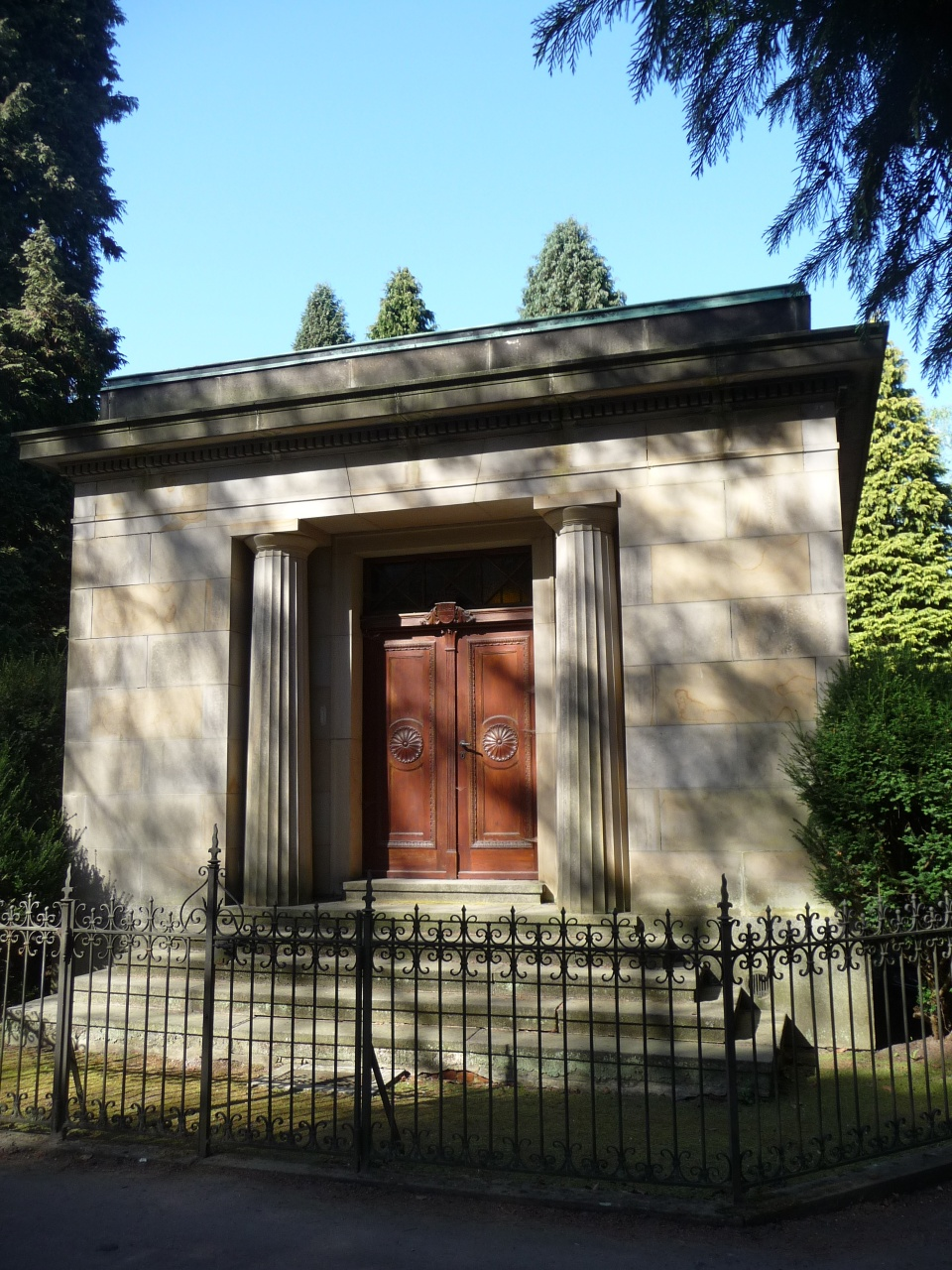

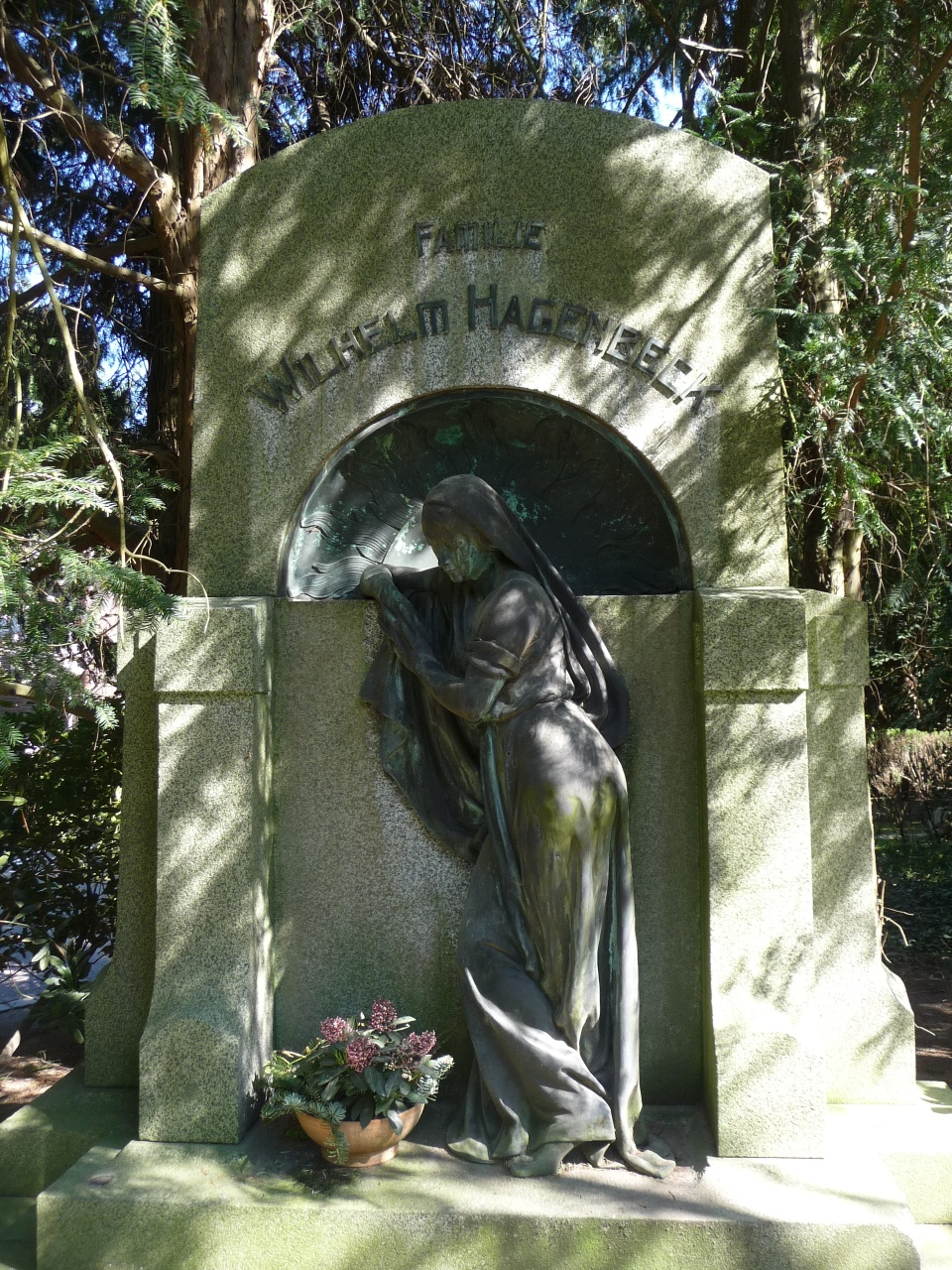
