= Erich Buder =

German flying ace

- Born: 14 January 1896; Frankfurt/Oder
- Died: 24 May 1975 (aged 79); Hannover
- Military career
- Allegiance: Germany
- Branch: Aviation
- Rank: Vizefeldwebel
- Units: Jagdstaffel 84; Jagdstaffel 26; Kampfeinsitzerstaffel 16
- Awards: Military Merit Cross; Iron Cross

Vizefeldwebel Erich Buder (14 January 1896 – 24 May 1975) was a World War I flying ace credited with twelve aerial victories.

== Aerial service in World War I ==
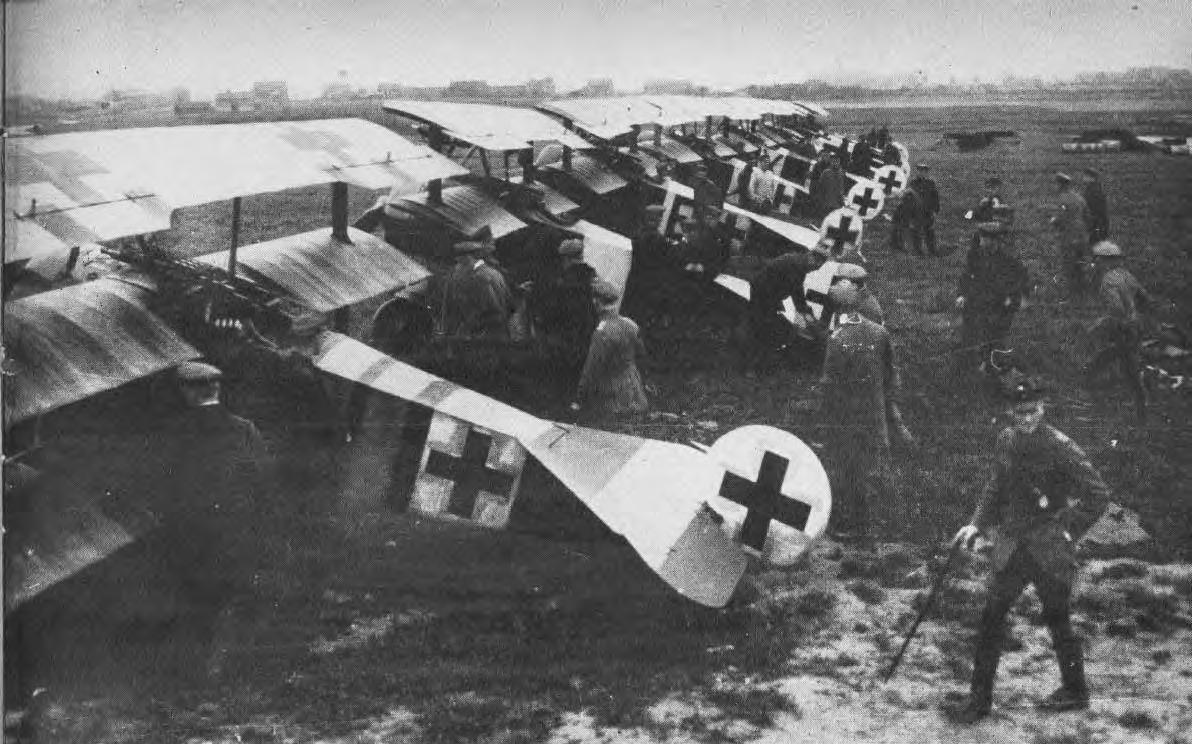
Fokker Dr.Is of Jagdstaffel 26 of the Luftstreitkräfte at Erchin, France.

Buder served with Jagdstaffel 84 before transferring to Jagdstaffel 26. He scored his wins with this squadron between 26 March and 4 November 1918, with two victories possibly unconfirmed at war's end. He was transferred to Kampfeinsitzerstaffel 6 as the war ended. Besides the First and Second Class Iron Cross, he received the Golden Military Merit Cross, which was the enlisted men's equivalent of the Blue Max, on 2 November 1918.

== Aerial victory list ==
Buder's final two victories may not have been officially confirmed.

No.	Date/time	Foe	Location
1	26 March 1918	Royal Aircraft Factory RE.8	Northwest of Bapaume
2	8 May 1918 @ 0937 hours	Royal Aircraft Factory SE.5a	Becelaere
3	7 July 1918 @ 1115 hours	Nieuport 28	Soissons
4	15 July 1918 @ 1255 hours	Breguet 14	East of Boucheres
5	20 July 1918 @ 1047 hours	SPAD	Northeast of Chaudun
6	11 August 1918 @ 1150 hours	Breguet 14	Braye
7	11 August 1918 @ 1225 hours	SPAD	West of Cuffies
8	14 August 1918 @ 1255 hours	Breguet 14	Chamery
9	4 September 1918 @ 0910 hours	Sopwith Camel	Cantin
10	4 September 1918 @ 0925 hours	Sopwith Camel	Gouy
11?	3 November 1918 @ 1450 hours	Royal Aircraft Factory RE.8	Ounaing
12?	4 November 1918 @ 1530 hours	Airco DH.9	Blangries
