= Alfred Fleischer =

- Born: 16 March 1895; Graudenz, German Empire (present day Poland)
- Died: 11 June 1978 (aged 83); Hildesheim, Germany
- Military career
- Allegiance: Germany
- Branch: Grenadiers; aviation
- Rank: Oberst
- Unit: Jagdstaffel 17
- Commands: Air bases in Russia, Hungary, and Yugoslavia during World War II
- Awards: Iron Cross First Class
- Other work: Also served in World War II

Alfred Fleischer was a German World War I flying ace credited with six confirmed aerial victories. He served as a grenadier until late 1916 before transferring to aviation and becoming a fighter pilot. In an unusual turn of events, he became friends with an American pilot he shot down.

Fleischer would return to Germany's service during World War II, commanding air bases in Russia, Hungary, and Yugoslavia. Postwar, he would move to the United States with the aid of the pilot he had downed in World War I.

== Early life ==
Alfred Fleischer was born on 16 March 1895 in Graudenz, Silesia, in present-day Poland; at the time he was born, it was part of the German Empire.

== World War I ==
Fleischer began his military service with the 1st (Emperor Alexander) Guards Grenadiers in 1914. He served with them through the Battle of the Somme and the Battle of Verdun, and was wounded in late 1916. He then transferred to the Luftstreitkräfte, becoming a fighter pilot with Jagdstaffel 17. He was posted to Jasta 17 on 30 May 1918, and scored his first aerial victory on 29 June 1918.

Fleischer's second victory came on 1 August 1918. He was in a flight of five on a morning patrol at 14,000 feet. A Nieuport 28 that had been attacking a German observation two-seater dove to assault Jasta 17's flight commander. The Nieuport wounded the German pilot and left his plane smoking. In turn, Fleischer attacked to rescue his flight commander. The Nieuport zoomed vertical to avoid being shot at, but Fleischer managed to pepper him with machine gun fire. The Nieuport did a wingover to the left to escape, and Fleischer followed. The two of them circled downwards to less than 1,500 feet altitude. As Fleischer lined up a shot from about 50 yards, he realized the Nieuport's engine had quit. The Nieuport crashlanded. Later, Fleischer and Lieutenant Clifford L. McElvain of the 27th Aero Squadron met and cordially shook hands. It was the beginning of a 45-year friendship.

Fleischer went on to score four more confirmed victories by war's end, and was awarded the Iron Cross First Class.

== List of aerial victories ==
See also Aerial victory standards of World War I

Confirmed victories are numbered and listed chronologically. Unconfirmed victories are denoted by "u/c" and are listed by date.

| No. | Date/time | Aircraft | Foe | Result | Location | Notes |
|---|---|---|---|---|---|---|
| 1 | 29 June 1918 @ 1845 hours | Albatros D.Va | SPAD | Destroyed | Coullemelle, France | |
| 2 | 1 August 1918 @ 0800 hours | Fokker D.VII | Nieuport 28 | Captured | Vicinity of Fère-en-Tardenois, France | American pilot C. L. McElvain survived |
| 3 | 19 August 1918 @ 2040 hours | Fokker D.VII | SPAD | Destroyed | Fonteny, France | |
| u/c | 5 September 1918 | Fokker D.VII | SPAD | | | |
| 4 | 4 October 1918 | Fokker D.VII | SPAD | Destroyed | Saint-Morel | |
| 5 | 3 November 1918 | Airco DH.4 | Destroyed | | | |
| 6 | 3 November 1918 | Fokker D.VII | Enemy two-seater | Destroyed | | |

== Post World War I ==
Like all Fokker D.VII pilots, Fleischer had to hand over his plane at war's end. He hated to do that, and felt bitterly betrayed by Germany's defeat.

Fleischer's life between the world wars is unknown. However, he returned to military service for World War II. As an oberst, he commanded air bases in Russia, Hungary, and Yugoslavia. Meanwhile, his old opponent McElvain served in the United States Army Air Force as a colonel.

After World War II, McElvain arranged for Fleischer and his wife and son to move to Chicago. McElvain owned a mortgage firm, and hired the younger Fleischer to work for him. Alfred Fleischer would retire back to Germany in 1961, dying there on 11 June 1978. Fleischer's son Gunter became an American citizen and married a girl named Denise from the Belgian Consulate in Chicago. They had two children Eric and a daughter. Gunter worked as a property valuer for a Mortgage company before retiring to Florida.
