= Georg Strasser =

German aviator and World War I flying ace

- Born: 10 November 1891; Leukerstetten, Württemberg
- Died: 4 December 1925 (aged 34)
- Military career
- Allegiance: German Empire
- Branch: Luftstreitkräfte
- Service years: 1914–1918
- Rank: Leutnant
- Unit: FA 44, FEA 3, Jasta 17
- Conflicts: World War I

Georg Strasser (10 November 1891 – 4 December 1925) was a German aviator and World War I flying ace with seven victories. He scored his first four victories as a Vizefeldwebel. He received a field promotion to Leutnant between 10 July and 13 August 1917. He died whilst working as a test pilot for Junkers.

== Bibliography ==
- Bailleux, Yves & Cony, Christophe (November 2001). "As allemands 14/18: Georg Strasser et la Jasta 17" [German Aces of the Great War: Georg Strasser and Jasta 17]. Avions: Toute l'Aéronautique et son histoire (in French) (104): 50–56. ISSN 1243-8650.
- Saintes, Philippe (October 2001). "Un as allemand 14/19: Georg Strasser" [A German Ace of the Great War: Georg Strasser]. Avions: Toute l'Aéronautique et son histoire (in French) (103): 54–60. ISSN 1243-8650.
