= Jagdstaffel 84 =

Jasta 84
- Active: 1918
- Country: Kingdom of Württemberg, German Empire
- Branch: Luftstreitkräfte
- Type: Fighter squadron
- Engagements: World War I

Royal Württemberg Jagdstaffel 84, commonly abbreviated to Jasta 84, was a "hunting group" (i.e., fighter squadron) of the Luftstreitkräfte, the air arm of the Imperial German Army during World War I.

== History ==
Jasta 84 was founded on 28 or 29 October 1918. Its predecessors were Kampfeinsitzerstaffeln ("Scout Detachments") 4a and 4b. The new squadron never became operational.
