= Johannes Buder =

Johannes Buder may refer to:

- Johannes Buder, German gymnast who represented Germany at the 1912 Summer Olympics
- Johannes Buder (botanist) (1884–1966), German botanist at the University of Wrocław Botanical Garden
