= Judit Kárász =

Hungarian photographer

- Born: 21 May 1912; Szeged, Hungary
- Died: 30 May 1977 (aged 65)
- Education: École de la Photographie, Arles, The Bauhaus
- Known for: Photography

Judit Kárász (21 May 1912 – 30 May 1977) was a Hungarian photographer interested in the medium's ability to reveal the hidden structures of everyday subject matter. Her photography brought together social documentary and modernist ideas such as Gestalt theory.

== Biography ==
=== Early life ===
Kárász was born in Szeged, Hungary, and spent her childhood between Szeged, Pécs and Budapest. She began taking photographs in high school before enrolling at the École de la Photographie in Arles, France in 1930, followed by the Bauhaus school of art and design.

=== Bauhaus ===
On 21 June 1932 Kárász received her Bauhaus diploma, where she majored in photography. She was taught by Walter Peterhans, who founded the school's photography department in 1929. Influenced by the work of artists such as fellow Hungarian László Moholy-Nagy who had previously taught at the school, Kárász began to experiment with compositional devices, such as bird's-eye perspective, and explored modernist themes and subject matters including industrial landscapes.

=== Career ===
In 1931 Kárász became a member of Kostufa (Kommunistische Studenten Fraktion) a communist student group, and following her active role in election campaigns she was expelled from the Sachsen-Anhalt area of Germany. Between 1932 and 1935 Karasz worked as a laboratory technician at the Dephot in Berlin, a photographic agency that represented photojournalists, such as Robert Capa.

Karasz was involved with the Workers-Photography movement, a collective associated with communism dedicated to activating photography for social ends.

In 2014 the Tate acquired five of her photographs. In 2015 these works were displayed at Tate Modern alongside photographs by Guy Bourdin and Astrid Klein.
