= Jagdstaffel 61 =

Jasta 61
- Active: 1918
- Country: Kingdom of Prussia, German Empire
- Branch: Luftstreitkräfte
- Type: Fighter squadron
- Engagements: World War I

Royal Prussian Jagdstaffel 61, commonly abbreviated to Jasta 61, was a "hunting group" (i.e., fighter squadron) of the Luftstreitkräfte, the air arm of the Imperial German Army during World War I. The squadron would score over 25 aerial victories during the war. The unit's victories came at the expense of four killed in action, three wounded in action, one injured in a flying accident, and one taken prisoner of war.

== History ==
On 11 January 1918, Jasta 61 was founded. The new squadron became operational on 24 January 1918. It was assigned to 7 Armee on 10 March 1918. Jasta 61 drew first blood on 22 March. It then joined Jagdgruppe 11 circa 19 April 1918. As part of this fighter wing, it would fly support for 3 Armee, 7 Armee, and 9 Armee during these waning months of the war.

== Commanding officers (Staffelführer) ==
- Maxmilian Edler von Daniels: ca 24 January 1918 – 7 June 1918 (KIA)
- Siegfried Büttner: 7 June 1918 – War's end

== Duty stations ==
- Voyenne, France: ca 24 January 1918
- Vivaise, France: 10 March 1918 – 19 April 1918
- Ercheu, France: 19 April 1918

== Aircraft ==
Although types of aircraft are unknown for the Jasta, its unit marked its planes' fuselage sides with a black and white star.
