= Jagdstaffel 63 =

Jasta 63
- Active: 1918
- Country: Kingdom of Prussia, German Empire
- Branch: Luftstreitkräfte
- Type: Fighter squadron
- Engagements: World War I

Royal Prussian Jagdstaffel 63, commonly abbreviated to Jasta 63, was a "hunting group" (i.e., fighter squadron) of the Luftstreitkräfte, the air arm of the Imperial German Army during World War I. The squadron would score 16 aerial victories during the war. The unit's victories came at the expense of seven pilots killed in action, and one killed in a flying accident.

== History ==
Jasta 63 was created at the Fliegerbeobachter-Schule ("Aerial Observer School") at Warsaw, Poland, on 16 January 1918. The new unit went operational on 26 January 1918. It was assigned to 18 Armee on 1 February 1918. The squadron scored its first aerial victory on 24 March 1918. On 6 July 1918, Jasta 63 transferred to 1 Armee. On 12 August 1918, the fighter squadron was posted to 6 Armee. Jasta 63 served through end of hostilities.

== Commanding officers (Staffelführer) ==
- Fritz Loerzer: 16 January 1918 - 21 February 1918
- Hermann Leptien: March 1918 - November 1918

== Duty stations ==
- Grivy-Loisy, France: 1 February 1918
- Bignicourt, France: 6 July 1918
- Santes, Nord, France: 12 August 1918
