= Franz Brandt =

German flying ace (1893–1954)

- Born: 13 February 1893; Minden, Kingdom of Prussia
- Died: 1954 (aged 60–61)
- Military career
- Allegiance: German Empire
- Units: Kampfstaffel 14; Schutzstaffel 2; Jagdstaffel 19; Jagdstaffel 27
- Commands: Jagdstaffel 26
- Awards: Iron Cross 1st & 2nd class

Franz Brandt (13 February 1893 – 1954) was a German World War I flying ace credited with ten confirmed aerial victories, as well as three unconfirmed claims.

== Early life ==
Franz Brandt was born on 13 February 1893 in Minden.

== World War I service ==
Brandt entered the war an artilleryman. In July 1915 he transferred to aviation. His first assignment after training was Kampfstaffel (Tactical Bomber Squadron) 14, between July and September 1916. In December, he moved on to Schutzstaffel (Protection Squadron) 2; he saw some action there, but no results yet. On 2 February 1917, he was reassigned, to Jagdstaffel 19. There he flew an Albatros D.II. He scored his first victory on 4 May, downing a Spad VII. On 21 August 1917, he took out an enemy observation balloon for his second triumph. On 31 December 1917, he changed squadrons again, to Jagdstaffel 27. In his tenure there, he downed enemy fighter planes on 23 January, 7 April, and 17 June 1918. On 27 June 1918, he was appointed to command of . Between 7 July and 22 September, he shot down four enemy fighters and a two-seater. Brandt ended the war still commanding Jagdstaffel 26.

== Decorations and awards ==
- Iron Cross of 1914, 1st and 2nd class
