= Military Merit Cross (Prussia) =

Military Merit Cross (Militär-Verdienstkreuz)
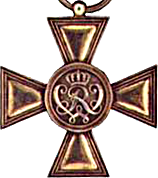
- Golden Military Merit Cross
- Type: cross
- Awarded for: Bravery
- Description: Gold cross pattée with a center medallion.
- Presented by: the Kingdom of Prussia
- Eligibility: Non-commissioned officers and enlisted soldiers
- Status: Obsolete
- Established: February 27, 1864
- First award: 16 awards on September 20, 1866
- Final award: November 8, 1918

Highlights
- Total: 38 before World War I, 1,773 during World War I
- ribbon bar of the award

Order of Wear 1916
- Next (higher): Prussian Crown Order, 3rd or 4th Class with Swords
- Next (lower): Military Honor Medal, 1st Class
- Related: Military Merit Cross (Bavaria); Gold St. Henry Medal (Saxony); Military Merit Order (Württemberg); Military Karl-Friedrich Merit Medal (Baden)

The Military Merit Cross (German: Militär-Verdienstkreuz) was the highest bravery award of the Kingdom of Prussia for non-commissioned officers and enlisted soldiers. It was also known as the Golden Military Merit Cross (Goldenes Militär-Verdienstkreuz) to distinguish it from the Military Decoration 1st Class (Militär-Ehrenzeichen I. Klasse), a lesser Prussian enlisted bravery decoration which was an identical cross but in silver. The Military Merit Cross came to also be known as the "Pour le Mérite for non-commissioned officers and enlisted men" (Orden Pour le Mérite für Unteroffiziere und Mannschaften), after the Pour le Mérite, Prussia's highest military decoration for officers.

The Military Merit Cross was founded by King Wilhelm I of Prussia on February 27, 1864. It was originally reserved for those in the rank of Feldwebel (the then-highest NCO grade) and below, but eligibility was later extended to soldiers in the rank of Offizier-Stellvertreter, a rank created in 1887 which was roughly comparable to a warrant officer-type rank.

The first 16 awards were made for the Austro-Prussian War of 1866. No awards were made for the Franco-Prussian War of 1870-71, where the principal Prussian military decoration, for both officers and enlisted men, was the Iron Cross. The next group of awards were 17 made in 1879 to Russian soldiers for bravery in the Russo-Turkish War of 1877-78. Only five more awards were made before World War I: four for colonial conflicts and one for the Boxer Rebellion.

During World War I, the Iron Cross was again reinstituted, and for the first years of the war that again became the principal Prussian military decoration. The first Military Merit Cross was awarded in October 1916, followed by 54 more awards in 1917. The rest of the awards of the Military Merit Cross were made in 1918. Despite the much larger number of awards in 1918, the decoration remained extremely rare compared to the number of eligible Prussian soldiers and compared to the number of awards of the Iron Cross and most of the enlisted decorations of the other German states.

Only members of Prussian Army units as well as the Navy and the Air Force were awarded the Golden Military Merit Cross. For members of the armies of the kingdoms of Bavaria , Saxony and Württemberg and the Grand Duchy of Baden there were separate awards for bravery, namely the Military Merit Cross (Bavaria), the Military Order of St. Henry, the Military Merit Order (Württemberg) and the Military Karl-Friedrich Merit Order.

Recipients received a monthly stipend, which was maintained even after the end of the Prussian monarchy in November 1918 through the Third Reich era, and was reestablished in West Germany in 1957.

== Bibliography ==
- Klaus D. Patzwall, ed., Das Preußische Goldene Militär-verdienst-kreuz (1986).
- Kurt-Gerhard Klietmann, Pour le Mérite und Tapferkeitsmedaille (1966).
