= Walter von Reichenau =

German field marshal (1884–1942)

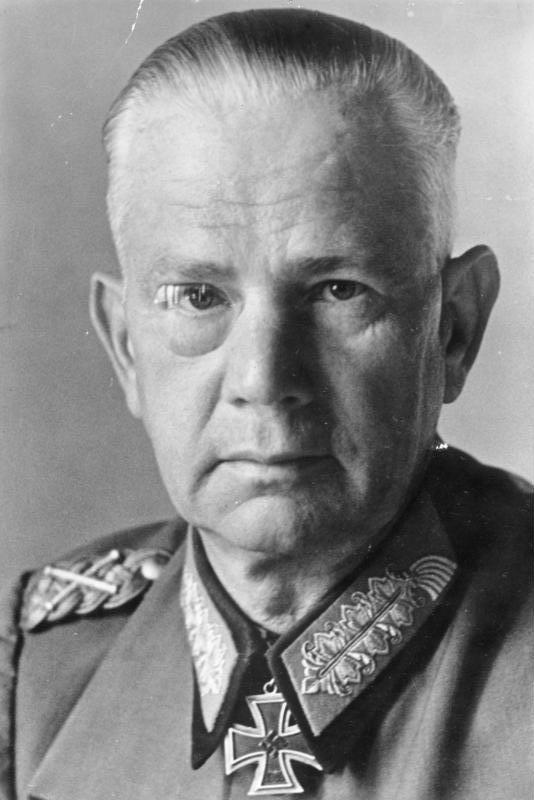
- Reichenau in 1941
- Born: Walter Karl Gustav August Ernst von Reichenau; 8 October 1884; Karlsruhe, Grand Duchy of Baden, Germany
- Died: 17 January 1942 (aged 57); Poltava, Soviet Union
- Burial place: Invalids' Cemetery, Berlin
- Military career
- Allegiance: Germany
- Branch: German Army
- Service years: 1903–1942
- Rank: Generalfeldmarschall
- Nickname: "The Bull"
- Commands: 10th Army; 6th Army
- Conflicts: World War I; World War II; Invasion of Poland; Battle of France; Operation Barbarossa
- Awards: Knight's Cross of the Iron Cross; Iron Cross 2nd and 1st Class

Walter Karl Gustav August Ernst von Reichenau (8 October 1884 – 17 January 1942) was a German Generalfeldmarschall (field marshal) in the Heer (army) of Nazi Germany during World War II. He was nicknamed "The Bull" (German: Der Bulle). Reichenau commanded the 6th Army during the invasions of Belgium and France. During Operation Barbarossa, the invasion of the Soviet Union (USSR) in 1941, he continued to command the 6th Army as part of Army Group South as it captured Ukraine and advanced deep into the USSR.

While in command of the 6th Army, Reichenau issued the notorious Severity Order which encouraged German soldiers to murder Jewish civilians on the Eastern Front. His troops cooperated with the Schutzstaffel (SS) Einsatzgruppen units in the commission of the massacre of over 33,000 Jews at Babi Yar, and assisted with other crimes against humanity that occurred in areas under his command during the Holocaust.

== Early life and service ==
The son of Prussian lieutenant general Ernst August von Reichenau, Walter von Reichenau was born in 1884 in Karlsruhe. One of his brothers was the writer and publicist Ernst von Reichenau. Walter joined the Prussian Army as an artillery officer cadet on 14 March 1903. He then attended the Prussian War Academy.

At the beginning of the First World War, Reichenau was adjutant of the 1st Guards Field Artillery Regiment, and in this position, he was promoted to captain on 28 November 1914 and awarded the Iron Cross 2nd Class and 1st Class over the course of the year. The following year, he was transferred to the German General Staff and in the course of 1915 he served as second staff officer (Ib) of the 47th Reserve Division and then as first staff officer (Ia) of the 7th Cavalry Division. As a junior staff officer he served under Max Hoffmann.

Reichenau's early years are described in conflicting terms, as both progressively minded but also brutal, with a history of executing soldiers who were AWOL, even in times of peace. Greatly unconventional, he was an avid outdoors man, spoke English at home and in contrast to his later activities in Russia, insisted on supporting World War I Jewish veterans' events in full military uniform, even after Hitler came to power.

=== Interwar period ===
In April 1919, Reichenau married the Silesian aristocrat Alexandrine Gräfin Maltzan Freiin zu Wartenberg und Penzlin (1895–1984), whose sister, Maria von Maltzan, was later part of the German Resistance.

Reichenau joined the Grenzschutz Ost Freikorps as a general staff officer, serving in Silesia and Pomerania. In 1919, he joined the newly established Reichswehr of the Weimar Republic. The officer corps of the new armed forces was limited to 4,000, and there was to be no general staff. Reichenau took a post in the Truppenamt, which was the "underground" equivalent of the general staff formed by Hans von Seeckt. He was promoted to major in 1924, to lieutenant colonel on 1 April 1929 and to colonel on 1 February 1932. In 1930, Reichenau was appointed chief of staff to the inspector of signals at the Ministry of the Reichswehr. He was later introduced to Hitler in April 1932 by his uncle, a diplomat. Extremely ambitious, he saw the Nazi Party as a revolutionary vessel in which he could propel his career, and so broke with the pro-monarchist politics of the Prussian military caste and became a devoted Nazi.

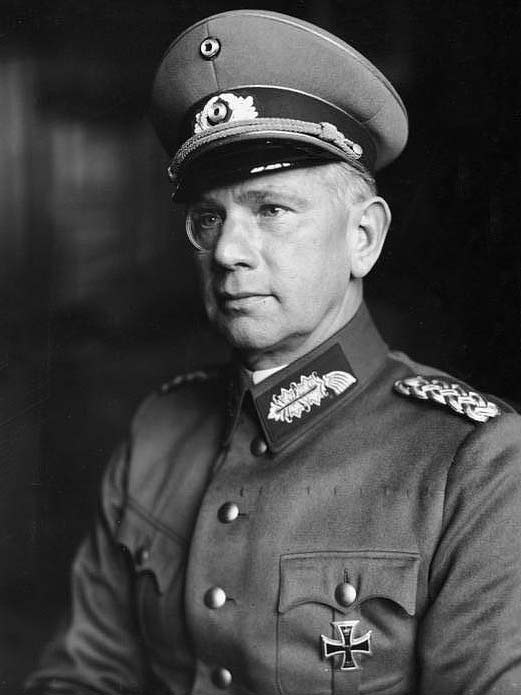
Reichenau in 1933

As an outspoken ally and advocate of Hitler and the Nazi Party, Reichenau soon ran afoul of cabinet member and eventual chancellor Kurt von Schleicher, who used his authority to have him transferred out of his prestigious posting in Berlin to the headquarters of the military district of East Prussia, a relative backwater. In East Prussia, Reichenau served under General Werner von Blomberg, a fellow exile of Schleicher's. Reichenau and Blomberg became political allies within the army, and it was Reichenau who introduced Blomberg to Hitler. Blomberg, who had a reputation for being manipulated by Reichenau, was captivated by Hitler, and both men soon used their connections with the Nazi party to advance. When Hitler came to power in January 1933, Blomberg became minister of war. One of his first acts was to promote Reichenau to head the powerful Ministerial Office, acting as liaison officer between the Army and the Nazi Party. He played a leading role in persuading Nazi leaders such as Göring and Himmler that the power of Ernst Röhm and the Sturmabteilung (SA) must be broken if the army was to support the Nazi-led government. This led directly to the Night of the Long Knives of 30 June 1934.

In 1935, Reichenau was promoted to lieutenant general (Generalleutnant) and was also appointed to command the 7th Army Corps in Munich. Reichenau was one of Hitler's favorite generals and his first choice for commander-in-chief of the Heer in 1934, but was overruled by President von Hindenburg who put in General Werner von Fritsch instead. Reflecting Reichenau's preference for assignments of political importance, Blomberg sent Reichenau to China in May 1934 to support General Alexander von Falkenhausen's existing military assistance mission. Konstantin von Neurath, the foreign minister, and German ambassador to Japan Herbert von Dirksen, raised objections to Reichenau's posting, fearing that the assignment of an officer of his stature could imperil Germany's relationship with Japan.

In 1938, after the Blomberg–Fritsch affair, in which Fritsch was forced out of the army command, Reichenau was again Hitler's first choice for head of the Heer, but older leaders such as Gerd von Rundstedt and Ludwig Beck refused to serve under Reichenau, and Hitler again backed down. Reichenau was given Group Command at Leipzig, seen as a "jumping off place to the top jobs in the Army". But Reichenau is supposed to have opposed the invasion of Austria in March 1938 and injured his standing with Hitler.

== World War II ==
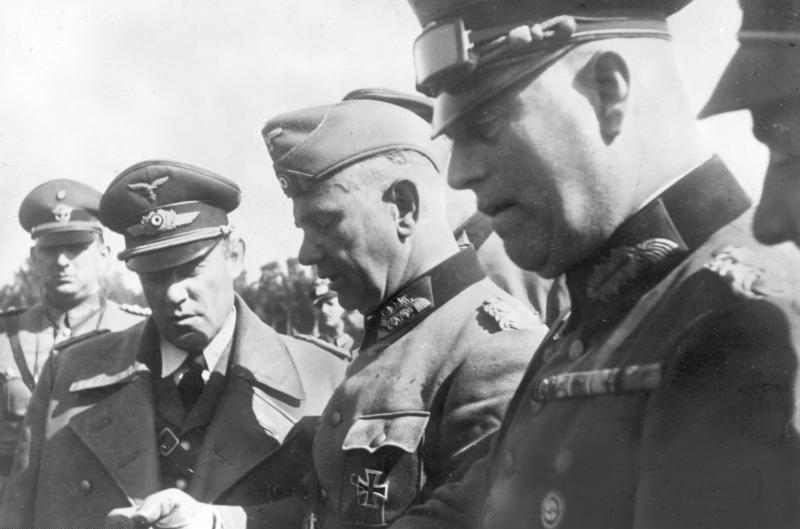
From the left: Kurt Daluege, Karl Bodenschatz, Reichenau and Wilhelm Keitel at a map briefing during the Invasion of Poland, September 1939.

In September 1939, Reichenau commanded the 10th Army during the German invasion of Poland and was the first German to cross the Vistula river, which he swam across, pushing his clothes ahead of him in a raft. After the campaign, he was awarded the Knight's Cross of the Iron Cross for his role as commander of the 10th Army.

In 1940, Reichenau led the 6th Army during the invasion of Belgium and France and, later that year, Hitler promoted him to Generalfeldmarschall (field marshal) during the 1940 Field Marshal Ceremony.

During the German invasion of the Soviet Union, as commander of the 6th Army, he led his army into the heart of Russia during the summer of 1941. The 6th Army was a part of Army Group South, and captured Kiev, Belgorod, Kharkov and Kursk. During its offensive into the Soviet Union, the German army was confronted with a number of superior tank designs. Reichenau inspected the Soviet tanks he came across, entering each tank and measuring its armour plate. According to general staff officer Paul Jordan, after examining a T-34, Reichenau told his officers, "If the Russians ever produce it on an assembly line we will have lost the war."

In November 1941, Hitler relieved Field Marshal von Rundstedt from his command of Army Group South and promoted Reichenau to take his place. At his personal recommendation to Hitler, Friedrich Paulus, a protege of Reichenau's and former member of his command staff, was promoted to take over his command of the 6th Army.

== Death ==
Reichenau was a habitual cross-country runner and suffered a stroke after a routine run in cold weather on 14 January 1942. He then sustained severe head injuries when the flight carrying him back to Leipzig for medical attention crashed on landing in Lemberg. Whether he died from his stroke or from injuries sustained in the crash is unknown. He was replaced at Army Group South by Fedor von Bock and given a state funeral.

== Nazi political activities and war crimes ==
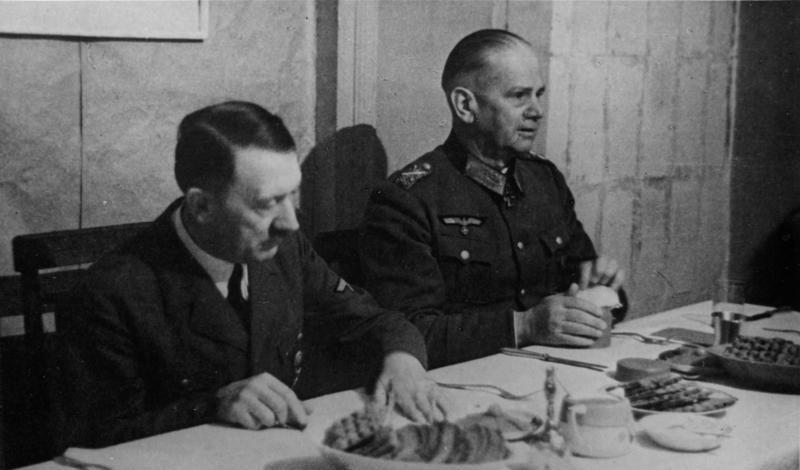
Hitler and Reichenau in September 1941

Reichenau's uncle was an ardent Nazi and introduced him to Adolf Hitler in April 1932. Reichenau joined the Nazi Party, although doing so was a violation of the army regulations laid down by Seeckt to insulate the army from national politics. Reichenau was an antisemite who equated Jewry with Bolshevism and a perceived Asian threat to Europe. Having died in 1942, Reichenau was never convicted of war crimes, but he was part of the German General Staff and High Command of the Armed Forces collectively indicted at Nuremberg. Specifically cited in the indictment was his "Reichenau Order", commonly known as the Severity Order of October 1941, which supported Nazi genocidal policies and advocated for punishment against the "subhuman species" of Jews and the extermination of Jewish Bolshevism in Europe.

The only objection Reichenau raised to the activities of the Einsatzgruppen in his sector was when they were killing so many Jews, so quickly, that they began to create ammunition shortages in his sector of operations, an issue he addressed by recommending that the SS and the Sicherheitsdienst (SD) limit themselves to two bullets per Jew.

Reichenau was in charge of the area of operations in which SS, Einsatzgruppen, and Ukrainian auxiliaries committed the massacre of over 33,000 Jews at Babi Yar. Earlier that year in August, Reichenau also directly acted to ensure the execution of ninety Jewish children in the Bila Tserkva massacre, after Helmuth Groscurth petitioned him to avert the killings.

== Awards and decorations ==
- Order of the Crown (Prussia), 4th class
- Knights Cross with swords of the House Order of Hohenzollern
- Iron Cross (1914) 1st and 2nd class
- Knight's Cross 1st class with swords of the Friedrich Order
- Hanseatic Cross of Hamburg
- Military Merit Cross of Austria-Hungary, 3rd class with war decoration
- Honour Cross of the World War 1914/1918
- Clasp to the Iron Cross 1st and 2nd class
- German Sport Badge in Bronze, 1913
  - Auszeichnung für vielfältige Leistung auf dem Gebiet der Leibesübungen, predecessor of the Deutsches Sportabzeichen
- Knight's Cross of the Iron Cross on 30 September 1939 as General der Artillerie and Commander-in-Chief of the 10. Armee

== Bibliography ==
- Adam, Wilhelm; Ruhle, Otto (2015). With Paulus at Stalingrad. Pen and Sword Books. ISBN 9781473833869.
- Craig, William (1974). Enemy at the Gates. The Battle for Stalingrad. Victoria: Penguin Books. ISBN 0-14-139017-4.
- Fellgiebel, Walther-Peer (2000) [1986]. Die Träger des Ritterkreuzes des Eisernen Kreuzes 1939–1945 — Die Inhaber der höchsten Auszeichnung des Zweiten Weltkrieges aller Wehrmachtteile [The Bearers of the Knight's Cross of the Iron Cross 1939–1945 — The Owners of the Highest Award of the Second World War of all Wehrmacht Branches] (in German). Friedberg, Germany: Podzun-Pallas. ISBN 978-3-7909-0284-6.
- Glantz, David M.; House, Jonathan (2009). To the Gates of Stalingrad: Soviet-German Combat Operations, April–August 1942. Lawrence, Kansas: University Press of Kansas. ISBN 978-0-7006-1630-5.
- Görlitz, Walter (1989). "Reichenau," in Correlli Barnett ed., Hitler's Generals. New York: Grove Press. pp. 208–218.
- U.S.A., et al., 4 (International Military Tribunal at Nuremberg 7 January 1946).
- Knopp, Guido (1998). Hitler's Warriors. Paulus the Defector. Mainz, Germany: ZDF.
- Kühne, Thomas (2010). Belonging and Genocide: Hitler's Community, 1918–1945. New Haven, Connecticut: Yale University Press. ISBN 9780300168570.
- Liddell Hart, B. H. (1948). The German Generals Talk. New York, NY: Morrow.
- Mayer, Arno J. (1988). Why Did The Heavens Not Darken?. Lanham, Maryland: Pantheon Books.
- Mitcham, Samuel W.; Mueller, Gene (2012). Hitler's Commanders: Officers of the Wehrmacht, the Luftwaffe, the Kriegsmarine, and the Waffen-SS. Lanham, Maryland: Rowman & Littlefield. ISBN 9781442211544.
- Mitcham, Samuel W. (2008). The Rise of the Wehrmacht: Vol. 1. Santa Barbara, California: ABC-Clio. ISBN 9780275996413.
- Parsinnen, Terry (2004). The Oster Conspiracy of 1938, The Unknown Story of the Military Plot to Kill Hitler. London: Pimlico. ISBN 1844133079.
- Scherzer, Veit (2007). The Knight's Cross Bearers 1939–1945 The Holders of the Knight's Cross of the Iron Cross 1939 by Army, Air Force, Navy, Waffen-SS, Volkssturm and Allied Forces with Germany (in German). Jena, Germany: Scherzers Militaer-Verlag. ISBN 978-3-938845-17-2.
- Stahel, David (2013). Operation Typhoon: Hitler's March on Moscow, October 1941. Cambridge University Press. ISBN 9781107035126.
- Webb, James Jack (2025). Generals and Admirals of the Third Reich: For Country or Führer. Vol. 3: P–Z. Havertown, PA: Casemate Publishers. ISBN 978-1-952-71518-1.
- Weinberg, Gerhard L. (2010). Hitler's Foreign Policy 1933-1939: The Road to World War II. Oxford, United Kingdom: Enigma Books. ISBN 9781936274840.

Military offices
Preceded by none	Commander of 10th Army; 6 August 1939 – 10 October 1939	Succeeded by General Heinrich von Vietinghoff
Preceded by none	Commander of 6th Army; 10 October 1939 – 29 December 1941	Succeeded by Generalfeldmarschall Friedrich Paulus
