= Georg Wetzell =

German Army officer (1869–1947)

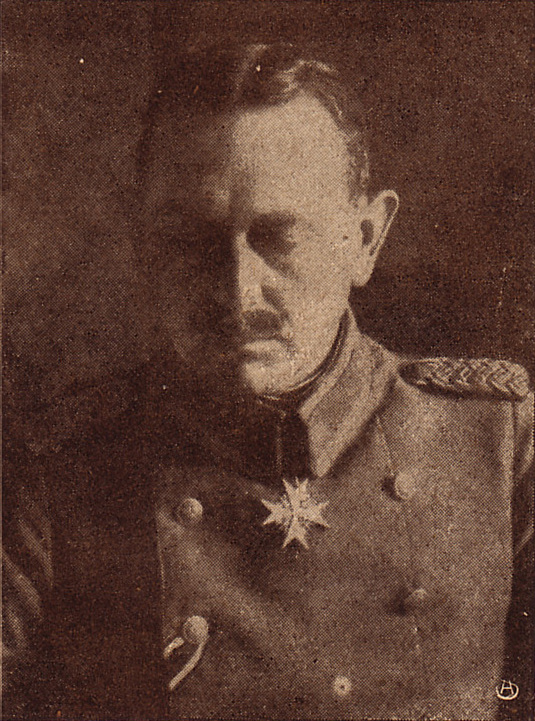
- Wetzell in 1918

Chief of the Troop Office
- In office October 1925 – 27 January 1927
- President: Paul von Hindenburg
- Preceded by: Otto Hasse
- Succeeded by: Werner von Blomberg

Personal details
- Born: 5 March 1869 Nieder-Erlenbach, Oberhessen, Grand Duchy of Hesse
- Died: 3 January 1947 (aged 77) Augsburg, Bavaria, Allied-occupied Germany
- Awards: Pour le Mérite with Oak Leaves

Military service
- Allegiance: German Empire; Weimar Republic
- Branch/service: Imperial German Army: Prussian Army; Reichsheer
- Years of service: 1889–1927
- Rank: General der Infanterie
- Battles/wars: World War I

Georg Wetzell (5 March 1869 – 3 January 1947) was a German career military officer who served for 38 years in the Imperial German Army and the Reichswehr. He participated in World War I, largely in staff positions – including on the Great General Staff – and was highly decorated. In the post-war period, he rose to the rank of General of the Infantry and was chief of the Truppenamt (troop office) from 1925 to 1927. After his retirement from active service, he acted as a military advisor to the government of China, edited a military journal and authored essays on military matters.

== Early life and career ==
Wetzell was born in 1869 at Nieder-Erlenbach in the Grand Duchy of Hesse. On 1 October 1889, he joined Pioneer Battalion No. 16 of the Prussian Army in Metz as a Fahnenjunker (officer cadet) and was commissioned as a Leutnant by the end of August 1891. He was transferred to Pioneer Battalion No. 20, also stationed in Metz, on 1 October 1893, and attended the Unified Artillery and Engineering School for further training. In 1898, he was assigned to the 144th Infantry Regiment, in which he was promoted to Premierleutnant. From 1901 to 1903, Wetzell attended the Prussian Staff College and was then assigned to the General Staff. After promotion to Major on 1 October 1912, he was assigned as Ia (first staff officer) to the staff of the III Army Corps on 22 March 1913.

== World War I ==
Wetzell remained in this post after the outbreak of World War I and, on 9 March 1915, he advanced to the chief of staff of the III Army Corps. In August 1916, he was transferred to the Oberste Heeresleitung (OHL; Supreme Army Command) and appointed chief of the operations department under the Chief of the General Staff of the Field Army. In this role, he was responsible for planning several major German offensives. On 11 December 1916, he was awarded the Pour le Mérite.

In 1917, Wetzell worked closely with General Erich Ludendorff who, in his position as First Quartermaster General, directed the German war effort. Wetzell was responsible for developing the plan for the Battle of Caporetto, which resulted in a major victory for the Germans and their Austro-Hungarian allies over the Italian Army. For his achievements in planning the campaign against Italy, he was awarded the oak leaves for the Pour le Mérite on 1 November 1917.

In October 1917, Wetzell urged Ludendorff to attack in the early spring of 1918, before the American Expeditionary Forces arrived on the Western Front. On 11 November 1917, Wetzell accompanied Ludendorff to the Mons Conference for discussions with Crown Prince Rupprecht of Bavaria, the commander of Army Group A, and Crown Prince Wilhelm of Prussia, the commander of Army Group B, and their respective chiefs of staff, von Kuhl and von der Schulenburg. Wetzell preferred to attack the French army, considering it the larger and more dangerous enemy. Ludendorff, however, decided to direct the attack against the British Expeditionary Force and accordingly ordered the planning for Operation Michael. Wetzell also planned the follow-on offensives, Operation Georgette and Operation Blücher. At the end of September 1918, Wetzell was appointed chief of staff of the 5th Army.

== Post-war career ==
After the end of the war, Wetzell served temporarily as the chief of staff of the XVIII Army Corps and was accepted into the peacetime Reichswehr of the Weimar Republic. In 1920, he was promoted to Oberst. In 1921, he was appointed inspector of the intelligence troops (In 7) in the Ministry of the Reichswehr and he was promoted to Generalmajor on 1 December 1923. On 1 February 1926, he was appointed Chief of the Troop Office and promoted to Generalleutnant on 1 February 1927. In April 1927, he was relieved of his post and transferred to the staff of Gruppenkommando I in Berlin. On 31 October 1927, he was retired with the brevet rank of General of the Infantry.

After his retirement, Wetzell founded the military magazine Deutsche Wehr (German Defense). Starting in 1930, he worked for four years as a general advisor on military matters to the Chinese government in Nanking. He was later dismissed and replaced by Hans von Seeckt. He then worked as editor-in-chief of the weekly military journal Militär-Wochenblatt from 1 October 1934 until December 1942 when it was discontinued. He also was the author and editor of many military essays. Wetzell died in Augsburg in January 1947.

== Awards and decorations ==
- Pour le Mérite with oak leaves
- Order of the Red Eagle 4th class
- Order of the Crown 4th class
- Knight's Cross of the House Order of Hohenzollern with swords
- Iron Cross (1914) 1st and 2nd class
- Service Award Cross of Prussia
- Military Merit Order of Bavaria, 3rd class with swords
- Officer's Cross of the Albert Order with swords
- Honor Cross of the Order of the Württemberg Crown with swords
- Knight's Cross 1st class of the Order of the Zähringen Lion
- Hesse Bravery Medal
- Hanseatic Cross (Hamburg)
- Military Merit Cross of Mecklenburg-Schwerin 1st class
- Friedrich-August-Kreuz 1st class
- Commander's Cross 2nd class of the Saxe-Ernestine House Order with swords
- Knight's Cross of the Order of Leopold with war decoration
- Order of the Iron Crown 3rd class with war decoration
- Military Merit Cross, 3rd class with war decoration
- Imtiyaz Medal in silver with swords
- Order of the Medjidie 3rd class with swords
- Liakat Medal in silver with swords
- Gallipoli Star
- Commander's Cross of the Order of Saint Alexander

== Selected written works ==
- Von Falkenhayn zu Hindenburg-Ludendorff (1921)
- Der Bündniskrieg (1937)
- Die deutsche Wehrmacht (1939)

== See also ==
- Sino-German cooperation (1926–1941)

== Sources ==
- Karl-Friedrich Hildebrand, Christian Zweng: Die Ritter des Ordens Pour le Mérite der I. Weltkriegs. Band 3: P–Z. Biblio Verlag, Bissendorf 2011, ISBN 3-7648-2586-3, pp. 528–530.
- Hanns Möller: Geschichte der Ritter des Ordens pour le mérite im Weltkrieg. Band II: M–Z. Verlag Bernard & Graefe, Berlin 1935, pp. 491–493.
