= Ferdinand von Bredow =

German Reichsheer general and Abwehr Chief (1884–1934)

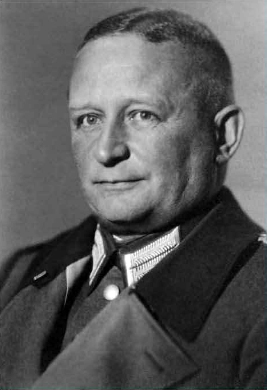
- von Bredow in 1930

3rd Chief of the Abwehr
- In office 1929–1932
- Preceded by: Günther Schwantes
- Succeeded by: Conrad Patzig

Personal details
- Born: 16 May 1884 Neuruppin, Kingdom of Prussia, German Empire
- Died: 30 June 1934 (aged 50) Berlin, Nazi Germany

Military service
- Allegiance: German Empire; Weimar Republic
- Branch/service: Imperial German Army; Reichsheer
- Rank: Generalmajor
- Commands: Abwehr

Ferdinand von Bredow (16 May 1884 – 30 June 1934) was a German Heer Generalmajor in the Reichwehr and head of the Abwehr (the military intelligence service) in the Reich Defence Ministry and deputy defence minister in Kurt von Schleicher's short-lived cabinet. He was killed during the Night of the Long Knives, for alleged involvement in a plot to overthrow Hitler.

== Early Life and Military Career ==
He was promoted to captain in November 1918 and saw active service in the First World War. Bredow was among Schleicher's closest associates, being described by the British military historian John Wheeler-Bennett as a man "blindly devoted" to Schleicher. Wheeler-Bennett lived in Berlin between 1927 and 1934 and, as a man well connected to the German ruling class, knew Schleicher and his followers well. Schleicher appointed Bredow as his successor as head of the Ministerial Office in the Defence Ministry, which was the Reichswehr's favorite instrument for exerting influence on politics.

Bredow, along with Schleicher, was involved in attempting to enlist Adolf Hitler's support during Schleicher's time as Chancellor between December 1932 and January 1933. Towards the end of this régime, Bredow, as the leader of Schleicher's personal "information service" was head of a number of coexisting secret service organizations, among them even the SS's Sicherheitsdienst, which was under Reinhard Heydrich's leadership. As a member of the Schleicher faction, Bredow was dismissed by the new Defence Minister, General Werner von Blomberg, who replaced him with General Walter von Reichenau. In the spring of 1934, Bredow was significantly involved in Schleicher's attempt at a political comeback, displaying what Wheeler-Bennett called a "lack of discretion that was terrifying" as he went about casually showing anyone who was interested a proposed new cabinet list. In Bredow's cabinet list, Hitler was to remain Chancellor, Schleicher was to serve as Vice-Chancellor, Ernst Röhm was to become Defence Minister, Gregor Strasser Economics Minister, and Heinrich Brüning Foreign Minister. In the overheated atmosphere of the spring of 1934, when it was an open secret that a rift had emerged between the SA and the Reichswehr, it was easy to misconstrue Bredow's scheming to change the cabinet as a plot to overthrow the Hitler government itself, and both Hermann Göring and Heinrich Himmler, who were plotting against Röhm, transformed Bredow's "irresponsible" intriguing into a gigantic plot to overthrow Hitler, with the additional twist that the alleged conspiracy of Schleicher and Röhm had been organized by the French ambassador André François-Poncet.

Bredow, along with Schleicher, was murdered in Berlin-Lichterfelde by SS men from the Leibstandarte Adolf Hitler in the Night of the Long Knives. Bredow was drinking tea on the afternoon of 30 June 1934 at the Hotel Adlon in Berlin, when he heard about the murder of Schleicher that morning on the radio. A foreign military attaché present offered Bredow the safety of his embassy, but Bredow refused, saying "I am going home. They have killed my Chief. What is there left for me?" Later the same day, Bredow answered his door at his house and was shot in the face at point-blank range. As Wheeler-Bennet later noted, "...in a moment he had joined his Chief".

== Awards and decorations ==
- Iron Cross of 1914, 1st and 2nd class
- Knight's Cross of the Royal House Order of Hohenzollern, with Swords
