= Ludwig Beck =

German general (1880–1944)

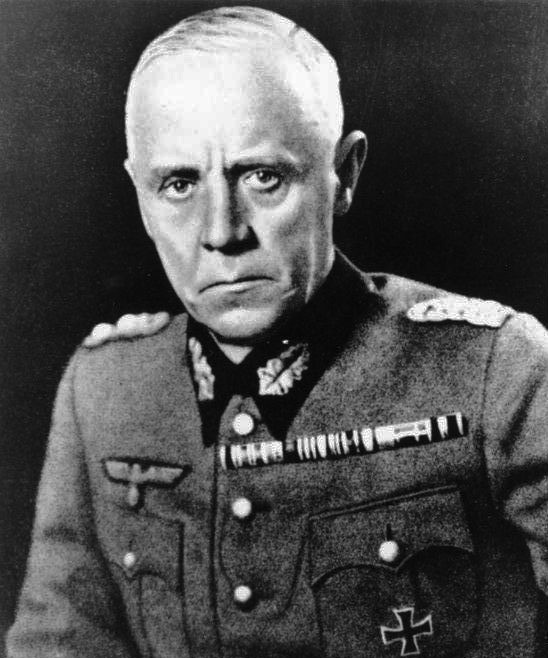
- Beck in 1936

Chief of the General Staff of the German Army High Command
- In office 1 July 1935 – 31 August 1938
- Chancellor: Adolf Hitler
- Leader: Werner von Fritsch as Supreme Commander of the Army
- Preceded by: Office established
- Succeeded by: Franz Halder

Chief of the Troop Office
- In office 1 October 1933 – 1 July 1935
- President: Paul von Hindenburg
- Chancellor: Adolf Hitler
- Preceded by: Wilhelm Adam
- Succeeded by: Himself as Chief of the OKH General Staff

Personal details
- Born: Ludwig August Theodor Beck; 29 June 1880 Biebrich, Hesse-Nassau, Kingdom of Prussia, German Empire
- Died: 20 July 1944 (aged 64) Berlin, Free State of Prussia, Nazi Germany
- Cause of death: Shot following a suicide attempt
- Spouse: Amelie Pagenstecher (m. 1916; died 1917)
- Domestic partner: Amalie Christine Auguste Luise Pagenstecher
- Children: Gertrud Beck
- Parent(s): Ludwig Beck; Bertha Draudt

Military service
- Allegiance: German Empire; Weimar Republic; Nazi Germany
- Branch/service: German Army
- Years of service: 1898–1938
- Rank: Generaloberst
- Battles/wars: World War I World War II

Ludwig August Theodor Beck (German: [ˈluːt.vɪç bɛk]; 29 June 1880 – 20 July 1944) was a German general who served as Chief of the German General Staff from 1933 to 1938. Beck was one of the main conspirators of the 20 July plot to assassinate Adolf Hitler.

Beck was a staff officer in the Truppenamt of the Reichswehr and became a fellow traveller of the Nazis during the Weimar Republic. Beck was appointed Chief of Staff of the German Army shortly after the Nazi rise to power, supporting Hitler's rearmament of Germany and forceful denunciation of the Treaty of Versailles, although he believed Germany needed more time to prepare for another war.

Beck was increasingly disillusioned with Hitler's aggressive foreign policy, the rising totalitarianism of the Nazi regime, and the influence of the SS over the army in military affairs. Beck became a leader of resistance to Nazism in military circles after retiring in 1938 due to public disagreements with Hitler on foreign policy, and later planned the 20 July plot with Claus von Stauffenberg. Beck was arrested by Friedrich Fromm when the plot failed and was executed by one of Fromm's men after a botched suicide attempt.

== Early life and career ==
Ludwig August Theodor Beck was born on 29 June 1880 in Biebrich in Hesse-Nassau (now a borough of Wiesbaden, Hesse) to industrialist Ludwig Georg Ernst Wilhelm Beck and his wife Bertha (née Draudt). He served on the Western Front during the First World War as a staff officer. After the war, he served in various staff and command appointments. In 1931 and 1932, he led the group of army writers, at the Department of the Army (Truppenamt), which published the German Army Operations Manual, Truppenführung. The first section was promulgated in 1933 and the second section in 1934. A modified version is still in use today by the Bundeswehr. He was promoted to Generalleutnant in 1932. Two years later, in 1934, he replaced General Wilhelm Adam as chief of the Truppenamt, the camouflaged General Staff (the Treaty of Versailles explicitly forbade the existence of the General Staff).

In September and October 1930, Beck was a leading defence witness at the trial in Leipzig of three junior Reichswehr officers: Lieutenant Richard Scheringer, Hans Friedrich Wendt and Hanns Ludin. The three men were charged with being members of the Nazi Party since members of the Reichswehr were forbidden from membership of political parties. The three officers admitted their membership and used as their defence the claim that Nazi Party membership should not be forbidden to military personnel. When the three officers were arrested after being caught distributing Nazi literature at their base, Beck, the commanding officer of the 5th Artillery Regiment based in Ulm, to which the three officers belonged, was furious and argued that since the Nazi Party was a force for good, Reichswehr personnel should not be banned from joining the party. At the preliminary hearing, Beck spoke on behalf of the three officers.

At the Leipzig trial of Ludin and Scheringer, Beck testified to the good character of the accused, described the Nazi Party as a positive force in German life and proclaimed his belief that the Reichswehr ban on Nazi Party membership should be rescinded. When Lieutenant Scheringer spoke of a future war in which the Nazi Party and the Reichswehr would fight hand in hand as brothers in a "war of liberation" to abrogate the Treaty of Versailles, Beck supported Scheringer by testifying, "The Reichswehr is told daily that it is an army of leaders. What is a young officer to understand by that?"

Historians such as Sir John Wheeler-Bennett have noted that Beck was deliberately distorting the principle of Hans von Seeckt's Führerarmee ("Army of Leaders"), which trained soldiers to be leaders for when the army would be expanded beyond the limits permitted by the Treaty of Versailles, by seeking to apply it to politics.

== Early career in Nazi Germany ==
In 1933, on witnessing the Nazi Machtergreifung, Beck wrote, "I have wished for years for the political revolution, and now my wishes have come true. It is the first ray of hope since 1918". In July 1934, Beck expressed some alarm at Nazi foreign policy involving Germany in a "premature war" after the failed Nazi putsch in Austria, which led Beck to warn that those in "leading positions" must understand that foreign adventures might then lead to Germany being forced to make a "humiliating retreat", which might bring about the end of the regime. In August 1934, after the death of President Paul von Hindenburg, which led to Adolf Hitler's assumption of the roles of powers of the presidency, most notably the position of commander-in-chief, Beck wrote that Hitler's move created "favourable conditions" for the Reichswehr.

Beck gained respect with the publication of his tactical manual, Truppenführung. Both Beck and General Werner von Fritsch commanded the 1st Cavalry Division, in Frankfurt an der Oder prior to assuming their command positions. During his time first as Chief of the Truppenamt (1933–1935) and then as Chief of the General Staff (1935–1938), Beck encouraged the development of armoured forces but not to the extent that advocates of Panzer warfare, such as Heinz Guderian wanted. In Beck's conception of power politics, it was crucial to have German military power restored to its pre-1919 levels, and from the latter half of 1933, he advocated a level of military spending beyond even those considered by Hitler. Once Germany was sufficiently rearmed, Beck thought that the Reich should wage a series of wars that would establish Germany as Europe's foremost power and place all of Central and Eastern Europe into the German sphere of influence.

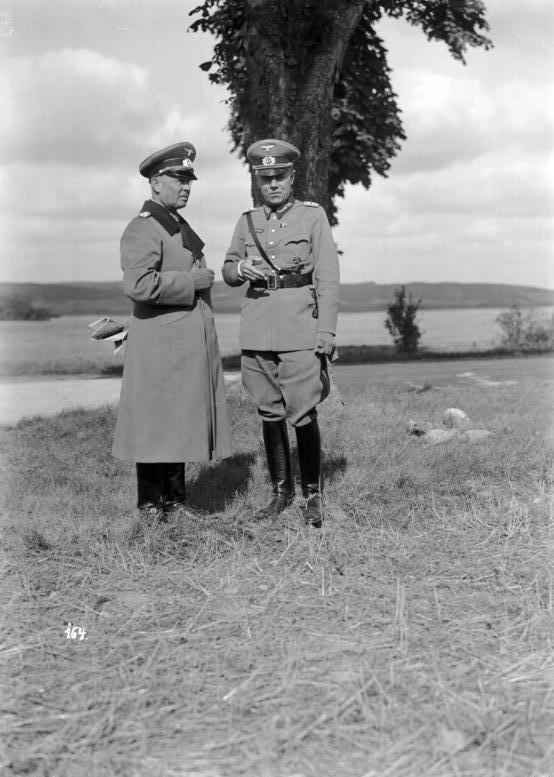
Beck (right) with Werner von Fritsch in 1937.

As Chief of the General Staff, Beck lived in a modest home in the Lichterfelde suburb of Berlin, and worked normally from 09:00 to 19:00 every day. In that role, Beck was widely respected for his intelligence and work ethic but was often criticised by other officers for being too interested in administrative details. In 1934, Beck wrote a lengthy covering letter to a long report on the British Army armour manoeuvres as a way of encouraging interest in armoured warfare. In Beck's view of the General Staff's role, the War Minister served in a mere administrative function, and the Chief of the General Staff should have been able to advise the Reich leadership directly. His views led to conflicts with War Minister Field Marshal Werner von Blomberg, who resented Beck's efforts to diminish his powers.

In 1936, Beck strongly supported Hitler during the remilitarisation of the Rhineland against Blomberg, who feared the French reaction to such a move. By late 1937 and early 1938, Beck had come into increasing conflict with other officers over the place and importance of the General Staff in the German military hierarchy, in which Beck wished to have all of the important decision making moved into the arms of the General Staff.

In the mid-1930s, Beck started to create his own intelligence network of German military attachés, whom he used both to collect and to leak information. Besides military attachés, Beck also recruited civilians for his private intelligence network, the most notable volunteer being Carl Goerdeler.

In May 1937, Beck refused an order to draw up orders for executing Fall Otto (Case Otto), the German plan for an invasion of Austria, under the grounds that such a move might cause a world war before Germany was ready. During the Anschluss of February–March 1938, once Beck was convinced that no war would result from a move against Austria, he swiftly drew up the orders. In Beck's conception of power politics, war was a necessary part of restoring Germany to a great power if the wars were limited and if Germany possessed enough strength and had allies that were sufficiently strong.

During the Blomberg-Fritsch Crisis in early 1938, Beck saw a chance to reassert the interests and power of the army against what he regarded as the excessive power of the Schutzstaffel (SS).

== Pre-war conflict with Hitler ==
Beck resented Hitler for his efforts to curb the army's position of influence. Beck tried very early—as Chief of the General Staff—to deter Hitler from using the grievances of the Sudetenland region of Czechoslovakia, most of whose population was ethnically German, as an excuse for war in 1938.

Beck had no moral objection to the idea of a war of aggression to eliminate Czechoslovakia as a state. In 1935, he had a series of meetings with Prince Bernard von Bülow, the State Secretary of the German Foreign Office and the Chief of the Hungarian General Staff to discuss plans "for the division of Czechoslovakia". On 12 November 1937, Beck submitted a memorandum stating that "various facts" show the requirement "for an imminent solution by force" of the problem of Czechoslovakia and that it was desirable to start preparing "the political ground among those powers which stood on our side or who were not against us" and that the "military discussion in either the one case or the other should begin at once".

However, Beck felt that Germany needed more time to rearm before starting such a war. In Beck's assessment, the earliest date Germany could risk a war was 1940, and any war that was started in 1938 would be a "premature war" that Germany would lose. Most of the generals felt that the idea of starting a war in 1938 was highly risky, but none of them would confront Hitler with a refusal to carry out orders since most of them thought that Beck's arguments against war in 1938 were flawed. From May 1938, Beck had bombarded Hitler, Wilhelm Keitel and Walther von Brauchitsch with memoranda opposing Fall Grün (Case Green), the plan for a war against Czechoslovakia. In the first memorandum, on 5 May 1938, Beck argued that the Sino-Japanese War meant Japan would be unable to come to Germany's aid, that the French Army was the best fighting force in Europe and that Britain would certainly intervene on the side of France if Germany attacked Czechoslovakia.

In his May memorandum, Beck argued that Hitler's assumptions about France, which were made in the Hossbach Memorandum of 1937, were mistaken and stated his belief that France "wishes for peace or, perhaps more accurately, abhors a new war" but that "in case of a real threat, or what is perceived by the people to be foreign policy pressure, the French nation comes together as if one". Beck believed "The French army is and remains intact and is at the moment the strongest in Europe". Beck ended with these comments: "The military-economic situation of Germany is bad, worse than in 1917–1918. In its current military, military-political and military-economic condition, Germany cannot expose itself to the risk of a long war". The May Crisis of 21–22 May 1938 further convinced Beck of the dangers of going to war in 1938 and led him to increase his efforts to stop a war that he felt that Germany could not win. In November 1938, Beck informed a friend that from the time of the May Crisis, he had only one consideration in his mind: "How can I prevent a war?"

On 22 May 1938, Hitler stated that he had deep respect for Beck for his pro-Nazi testimony at the Ulm trial of 1930, but his views were too much that of a Reichswehr general and not enough of a Wehrmacht general. Hitler commented that Beck was "one of the officers still imprisoned in the idea of the hundred-thousand-man army". On 28 May 1938, Beck had a meeting with Hitler, Foreign Minister Joachim von Ribbentrop, Admiral Erich Raeder, Hermann Göring, Wilhelm Keitel, and Walther von Brauchitsch, during which Hitler restated the views that he had first expressed in the Hossbach Memorandum. In response, Beck drafted another memo on 29 May in which he presented a case that the Czechoslovak Army was not, as Hitler argued, a weak force and that a limited regional war in Central Europe was not a realistic possibility. In the same memorandum, Beck proclaimed his agreement with Hitler's views about the necessity of acquiring Lebensraum in Eastern Europe, called the existence of Czechoslovakia "intolerable" and concluded that "a way must be found to eliminate it (Czechoslovakia) as a threat to Germany, even, if necessary, by war". However, Beck argued that Germany was not strong enough to fight the general war that would result from an attack on Czechoslovakia in 1938 and urged Hitler to avoid a "premature war". In particular, Beck argued, "It is not accurate to judge Germany today as stronger than in 1914". He also presented a detailed military case that more time was needed before the Wehrmacht would be as strong as the army of 1914. Furthermore, Beck contended that he could not "accept these estimates of the military power of France and England.... Germany, whether alone or in alliance with Italy, is not in a position militarily to match England or France".

At first, Beck felt that Hitler's rush to war in 1938 was caused not by his personality but rather him receiving poor military advice, especially from Keitel. As a result, Beck spent much of his time urging a reorganization of the command structure so that Hitler would receive his advice from the General Staff and presumably abandon his plans for aggression. In a memorandum opposing war in 1938, Beck commented: "Once again, the comments of the Führer demonstrate the complete inadequacy of the current top military-advisory hierarchy". Beck advocated the need for a "continual, competent advising of the commander-in-chief of the Wehrmacht on questions of war leadership" and predicted that otherwise, "the future destiny of the Wehrmacht in peace and war, indeed the destiny of Germany in a future war, must be painted in the blackest of colors".

It was only in June 1938 that Beck realised that Hitler was behind the drive for war. In a memorandum to Brauchitsch, Beck urged that all of the senior officers threaten a mass collective resignation to force Hitler to abandon his plans for Fall Grün in 1938. Beck ended his appeal to Brauchitsch: "If they all act together, then it will be impossible to carry out military action.... If a soldier in a position of highest authority in such times see his duties and tasks only within the limits of his military responsibilities, without consciousness of his higher responsibility to the whole people, then he shows a lack of greatness, a lack of comprehension of responsibility. Extraordinary times demand extraordinary actions!"

Beck's campaign for a mass resignation was not aimed at the overthrow of Hitler but was rather intended to persuade Hitler to abandon his plans for war in 1938 and to purge certain "radical" elements from the Nazi Party, which Beck believed to have a negative influence on Hitler. Together with the Abwehr chief, Admiral Wilhelm Canaris, and the German Foreign Office's State Secretary, Baron Ernst von Weizsäcker, Beck was a leader of the "antiwar" group in the German government, which was determined to avoid a war in 1938 that it felt Germany would lose. The group was not necessarily committed to the overthrow of the regime but was loosely allied to another, more radical group, the "anti-Nazi" faction centred on Colonel Hans Oster and Hans Bernd Gisevius, which wanted to use the crisis as an excuse for executing a putsch to overthrow the Nazi regime. The divergent aims between both factions produced considerable tensions.

In a June 1938 General Staff study, Beck concluded that Germany could defeat Czechoslovakia but that to do so would leave western Germany empty of troops, which could allow the French to seize the Rhineland with little difficulty. Beck maintained that Czechoslovak defences were very formidable, Prague could mobilise at least 38 divisions and at least 30 German divisions would be needed to break through, which required a campaign of at least three weeks. Beck concluded that Hitler's assumptions about a limited war in 1938 were mistaken. In July 1938, upon being shown Beck's 5 May 1938 memorandum opposing Fall Grün by Brauchitsch, Hitler called Beck's arguments "kindische Kräfteberechnungen" ("childish calculations"). In another memorandum of July 1938, Beck contended that a war against Czechoslovakia, France and Britain would end in Germany's defeat and urged Hitler to postpone his plans for aggression until Germany was strong enough for such a war. In late July 1938, Erich von Manstein, a leading protégé of Beck's, wrote to his mentor urging him to stay at his post and to place his faith in Hitler. On 29 July, Beck wrote a memorandum stating the German Army had the duty to prepare for possible wars with foreign enemies and "for an internal conflict which need only take place in Berlin". The 29 July memo is normally considered to be the start of Beck's efforts to overthrow the Nazi regime.

In August 1938, Beck suggested to Brauchitsch that a "house cleaning" of the Nazi regime was necessary, under which the influence of the SS would be reduced, but Hitler would continue as dictator. At a 10 August summit, attended by the leading generals of the Reich, Hitler spent much of the time attacking Beck's arguments against Fall Grün and won over the majority of the generals. Beck resigned alone on 18 August. He was replaced, as head of the General Staff, by General Franz Halder. At Hitler's request, Beck kept his resignation secret and thus nullified the protest value of his resignation. Hitler promised Beck that if he kept his resignation secret, he would be rewarded with a major field command, and Beck was much disillusioned after he was instead put on the retired list.

== Plotting ==
In the following years, Beck lived in retirement in his Berlin apartment and ceased to have any meaningful influence on German military affairs. His opposition to Hitler had brought him in contact with a small number of senior officers intent on deposing the dictator, and his home became the headquarters of the small circle of opposition. He increasingly came to rely on contacts with the British in the hope that London would successfully exert its influence on Hitler through threats and warnings, but he failed.

Beck and his conspirators knew that Germany faced certain and rapid defeat if France and Britain helped Czechoslovakia in 1938. Accordingly, they contacted the British Foreign Office, informed Britain of their plot and asked for a firm British warning to deter Hitler from attacking Czechoslovakia. In September 1938, British Prime Minister Neville Chamberlain, French Prime Minister Édouard Daladier and Italian Prime Minister Benito Mussolini signed the Munich Agreement, which handed the Sudetenland from Czechoslovakia to Germany. That ended the crisis and hence Beck's efforts at a putsch.

In the autumn of 1939, Beck was in contact with German Army officers, politicians, and civil servants, including General Halder, Dr. Hjalmar Schacht, Carl Goerdeler, Admiral Wilhelm Canaris and Colonel Hans Oster about the possibility of staging a putsch to overthrow the Nazi regime. By then, Beck had come to accept that it was not possible to overthrow the Nazi regime if that meant keeping Hitler in power. After a successful putsch, Germany was to be governed by a triumvirate of Beck, Goerdeler and Schacht, who would negotiate a peace with Britain and France that would allow Germany to keep most of its conquests, including Austria, all of western Poland and the Reich Protectorate of Bohemia-Moravia.

In the early stages of the war, after Poland had been overrun but before France and the Low Countries had been attacked, the German Resistance sought the assistance of Pope Pius XII in preparations for a coup to oust Hitler. Josef Müller was despatched on a clandestine mission to Rome. The Vatican considered Müller to be a representative of Beck and agreed to offer the machinery for mediation between the plotters and the Allies.

The Pope, communicating with Britain's Francis d'Arcy Osborne, channelled communications back and forth in secrecy. The British were non-committal, but the Resistance were encouraged by the talks. In January to February 1940, a series of meetings between Goerdeler, Beck, Ulrich von Hassell and Johannes Popitz produced agreement that when the Nazi regime was overthrown, Beck was to head the Council of Regency, which would govern Germany. In 1940 and 1941, Beck spent much time discussing with Goerdeler, Hassell and Erwin von Witzleben aspects of the proposed state after the successful overthrow of the regime.

Working alongside Hans Oster and Hans von Dohnanyi of the Abwehr, Beck contributed extensively to what became known as the Zossen documents—a clandestine archive of Nazi crimes and coup-planning materials stored at the OKH headquarters complex at Zossen. Beck's defeatist memoranda on the post-Polish campaign situation, Mittwochsgesellschaft lecture manuscript, and notes on his January 1940 discussions with Halder all featuring among its contents; his insistence that the documents be preserved for historical and postwar purposes is the most plausible explanation for why they were never destroyed despite repeated urgings from the imprisoned Dohnanyi.

== 20 July plot ==
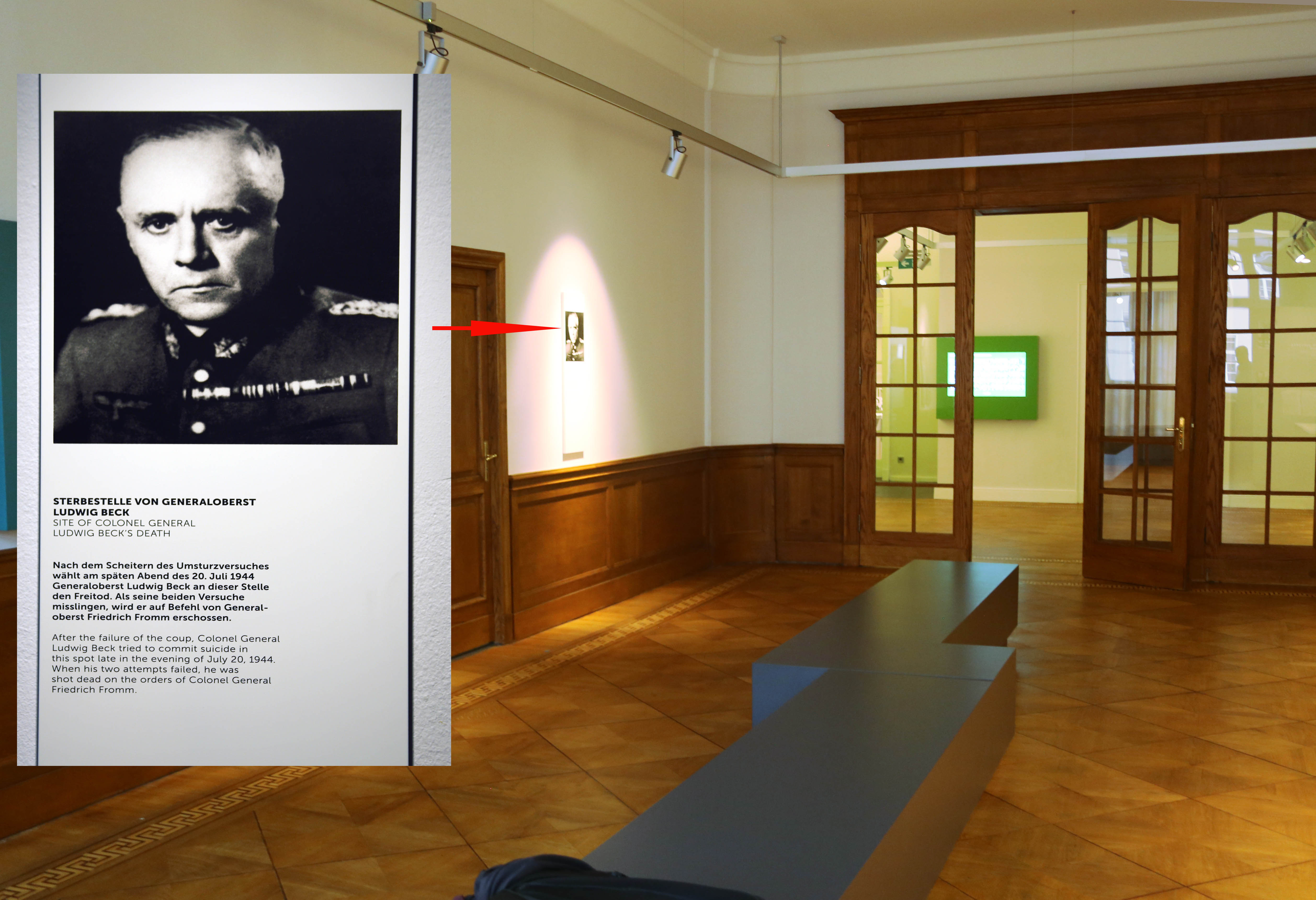
Site of Beck's suicide attempt in the Bendlerblock office in which Valkyrie was planned.

In 1943, Beck planned two abortive attempts to kill Hitler by means of a bomb. In May 1944, a memorandum by Field Marshal Erwin Rommel made it clear that his participation in the proposed putsch was based on the condition of Beck serving as the head of state in the new government. In 1944, Beck was one of the driving forces of the 20 July plot, along with Carl Goerdeler and Colonel Claus von Stauffenberg. It was proposed that Beck would become Reichsverweser (regent) and head of the provisional government that would assume power in Germany after Hitler had been eliminated.

The plot failed, however, and by the evening, Beck was in the custody of General Friedrich Fromm. Beck requested permission to keep his private pistol with the intention to commit suicide to avoid torture by the Gestapo. He shot himself in the head but succeeded only in severely wounding himself, and one of Fromm's men was brought in to administer the coup de grâce by shooting Beck in the back of the neck. Beck, along with other conspirators, was buried in secret that night.

== Personal life ==
In Bremen on 12 May 1916, Beck married Amalie Christine Auguste Luise Pagenstecher, who had been born in Bremen on 6 May 1893. In her youth Amalie had been treated for tuberculosis at the Stillachhaus Sanatorium in Oberstdorf. She had been advised by its head, Dr Luebhard Saathoff, never to have children. Following her marriage, he was persuaded to change his opinion. Amalie gave birth to Gertrud Beck on 1 January 1917 in Wiesbaden. Nine months later, on 16 November 1917, Amalie died in the sanatorium.

Beck was serving on the Western Front at the time of his wife’s death and had little interest in his five-year-old child. Consequently, Dr. Saathoff took responsibility for her and she joined his family of five children and several adopted children. From the age of 14, Gertrud began living permanently with her father. Following the start of World War II, to avoid being conscripted into the labour service, she moved to a family friend's forestry estate in East Prussia. There, she met Gunther Neubaur, who was born on 18 October 1915. Despite already being engaged and his parents objecting, since at 23 they considered her to be too young, the couple went ahead and married in Berlin on 2 March 1940. Their daughter was born in January 1941. Neubaur was serving as a Hauptmann (captain) when he was shot near Leningrad and died on 10 February 1942 while on the way to hospital.

In 1944, considering the risk from Allied bombing to be high, Beck arranged for Gertrud and her daughter to stay with her Neubaur in-laws in Oberstdorf due to its remote location in the Bavarian Alps. They were still there at the time of the failed plot to kill Hitler. Eight days after the event, two members of the Gestapo visited her and requested that she accompany them. Her sister-in-law, Annemarie, was present and suggested that since it was late in the day they should have dinner at a nearby hotel and stay the night there. After the Gestapo had left to take up the suggestion, the two women burnt any incriminating letters and documents that they could find. The next morning, the Gestapo took her to Munich, her three-year-old daughter remaining behind in the village, only to return her to Oberstdorf, where she lived until her death in 2008.

== Portrayals in media ==
The character of Beck appears in all film, literary, and TV dramatisations of the July 1944 plot, being played by Werner Hinz in The Plot to Assassinate Hitler (1955), Karl Ludwig Diehl in Jackboot Mutiny (1955), Ian Richardson in The Plot to Kill Hitler (1990), Remo Girone in Stauffenberg (2004) and Terence Stamp in Valkyrie (2008).

== Sources ==
- Boyd, Julia; Patel, Angelika (2022). A Village in the Third Reich (Paperback). London: Elliot and Thompson. ISBN 978-1-78396-656-1.
- Chowaniec, Elisabeth (1991). Der „Fall Dohnanyi" 1943–1945: Widerstand, Militärjustiz, SS-Willkür. Schriftenreihe der Vierteljahrshefte für Zeitgeschichte (in German). Vol. 62. Munich: R. Oldenbourg. ISBN 978-3-48664-562-0.
- Hoffmann, Peter (1977). The History of the German Resistance, 1933–1945. Cambridge, MA: MIT Press. ISBN 978-0-26208-088-0.
- Hoffmann, Peter (1988). German Resistance to Hitler (Paperback). Harvard, Cambridge, Massachusetts: Harvard University Press. ISBN 978-0-67435-086-1.
- May, Ernst (2000). Strange Victory. New York: Hill & Wang.
- Moorhouse, Roger Killing Hitler, Jonathan Cape, London, 2006, ISBN 978-0-224-07121-5
- Müller, Klaus-Jürgen (1983). "The German Military Opposition before the Second World War". In Mommsen, Wolfgang; Lettenacke, Lothar (eds.). The Fascist Challenge and the Policy of Appeasement. London: George Allen & Unwin. pp. 61–75. ISBN 978-0-04-940068-9.
- Müller, Klaus-Jürgen (1985). "The Structure and Nature of the National Conservative Opposition in Germany up to 1940". In Koch, H. W. (ed.). Aspects of the Third Reich. London: Macmillan. pp. 133–178. ISBN 978-0-333-35272-4.
- Murray, Williamson (1984). The Change in the European Balance of Power, 1938–1939 The Path to Ruin. Princeton: Princeton University Press. ISBN 978-0-691-05413-1.
- Reynolds, Nicholas Treason was No Crime: Ludwig Beck, Chief of the German General Staff, 1975, London: Kimber, 1976, ISBN 978-0-7183-0014-2, OCLC 2204228.
- Rothfels, Hans (1961). The German Opposition to Hitler. London: Oswald Wolff.
- Weinberg, Gerhard (1980). The Foreign Policy of Hitler's Germany Starting World War II. Chicago: University of Chicago Press. ISBN 978-0-226-88511-7.
- Wheeler-Bennett, John (1967) [1964]. The Nemesis of Power: The German Army In Politics, 1918–1945. London: Macmillan.
