= 3rd Division (Reichswehr) =

- 3. Division
- Active: 1921–1934
- Disbanded: October 1934
- Country: Weimar Republic
- Branch: Reichsheer
- Type: Infantry
- Size: Division
- Part of: Gruppenkommando 1
- Garrison/HQ: Wehrkreis III: Berlin

Commanders
- Notable commanders: Gerd von Rundstedt; Werner von Fritsch

The 3rd Division was a unit of the Reichswehr.

== Creation ==
In the Order of 31 July 1920 for the Reduction of the Army (to comply with the upper limits on the size of the military contained in the Treaty of Versailles), it was determined that a division would be established in every Wehrkreis (military district) by 1 October 1920. The 3rd Division was formed in January 1921 out of the Reichswehr's 3rd, 6th, and 15th Brigades, all part of the former Übergangsheer (Transition Army).

It consisted of 3 infantry regiments, an artillery regiment, an engineering battalion, a signals battalion, a transportation battalion, and a medical battalion.

The commander of Wehrkreis III was simultaneously the commander of the 3rd Division. For the leadership of the troops, an Infanterieführer and an Artillerieführer were appointed, both subordinated to the commander of the division.

The unit ceased to exist as such after October 1934 and its subordinate units were transferred to one of the 21 new divisions created in that year.

== Divisional commanders ==
- General der Artillerie Hermann Rumschöttel (1 October 1920 – 16 June 1921)
- General der Infanterie Richard von Berendt (16 June 1921 – 3 August 1921)
- General der Kavallerie Rudolf von Horn (3 August 1921 – 31 January 1926)
- General der Infanterie Otto Hasse (1 February 1926 – 1 April 1929)
- General der Infanterie Rudolf Schniewindt (1 April 1929 – 1 October 1929)
- General der Infanterie Joachim von Stülpnagel (1 October 1929 – 1 February 1932)
- General der Infanterie Gerd von Rundstedt (1 February 1932 – 1 October 1932)
- Generalleutnant Werner von Fritsch (1 October 1932 – 1 February 1934)

=== Infanterieführers ===
- Generalmajor Karl von Fabeck (1 October 1920 - 31 March 1921)
- Generalmajor Ernst Hasse (1 April 1921 - 31 March 1922)
- Generalmajor Gottfried Edelbüttel (1 April 1922 - 31 January 1925)
- Generalmajor Friedrich Freiherr von Esebeck (1 February 1925 - 31 October 1926)
- Generalmajor Heinrich von Bünau (1 November 1926 - 31 January 1929)
- Generalleutnant Wolfgang Fleck (1 February 1929 - 30 April 1931)
- Generalmajor Hugo Zeitz (1 May 1931 - 30 September 1931)
- Generalmajor Ulrich von Waldow (1 October 1931 - 31 January 1933)
- Generalmajor Maximilian von Weichs (1 February 1933 - 30 September 1933)
- Generalmajor Wilhelm Keitel (1 October 1933 - 30 September 1934)
- Generalmajor Hermann Hoth (1 October 1934 - 15 October 1935)

=== Artillerieführers ===
- Generalmajor Theodor Endres (1 November 1930 - 30 September 1931)
- Generalmajor Günther von Kluge (1 November 1931 - 30 September 1933)
- Generalmajor Wilhelm Keitel (1 October 1933 - 31 March 1934)

== Garrison ==
The divisional headquarters was in Berlin.
