= Blomberg–Fritsch affair =

1938 German political scandal

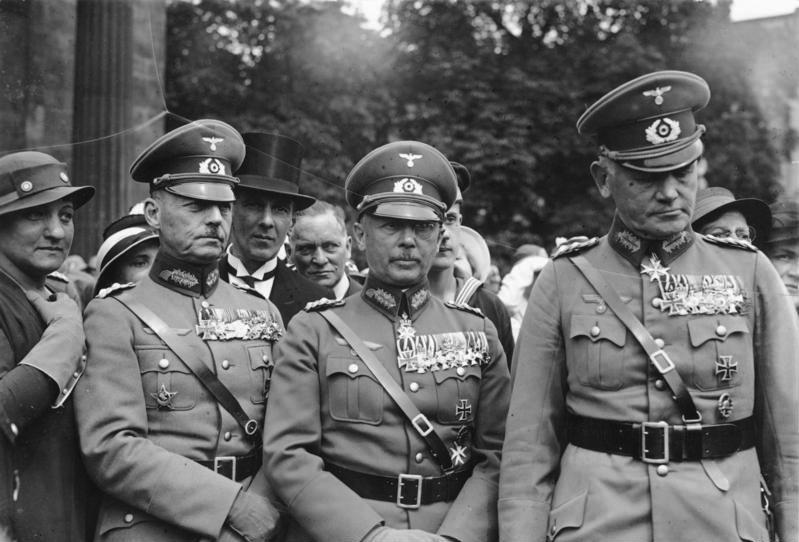
Left to right: General der Infanterie Gerd von Rundstedt, General der Artillerie Werner von Fritsch, and Generaloberst Werner von Blomberg at the Neue Wache, 1934

The Blomberg–Fritsch affair, also known as the Blomberg–Fritsch crisis (German: Blomberg–Fritsch–Krise), was the name given to two related scandals that occurred in the Wehrmacht of Nazi Germany in early 1938.

Adolf Hitler had been dissatisfied with Werner von Blomberg and Werner von Fritsch, two high-ranking Wehrmacht officials, regarding them as too hesitant with the war preparations he demanded. Blomberg was exposed in a marriage scandal with a convicted prostitute, and Fritsch was subjected to a manufactured accusation of homosexuality, which forced them to resign from their positions. The Blomberg–Fritsch affair resulted in the establishment of the Oberkommando der Wehrmacht and total subjugation of the Wehrmacht to Hitler. Fritsch was later rehabilitated but received only an honorary position in the army.

== Blomberg marriage ==
The Blomberg–Fritsch affair began soon after the marriage of War Minister Field Marshal Werner von Blomberg to Margarethe Gruhn on 12 January 1938. The Berlin police discovered that Gruhn had a long criminal record and had posed for pornographic photographs. According to testimony given much later, at the Nuremberg trials, information received by the Police Commissioner within days also indicated that "Marshal von Blomberg's wife had been a previously convicted prostitute who had been registered as a prostitute in the files of seven large German cities; she was in the Berlin criminal files ... she had also been sentenced by the Berlin courts for distributing indecent pictures." Marriage to a person with such a criminal record violated the standard of conduct expected of Wehrmacht officers, as defined by Blomberg himself. This came as a shock to Hitler, as Luftwaffe chief Hermann Göring had been Blomberg's best man, and Hitler himself had served as a witness at the wedding. Hitler and Göring saw the development as an opportunity to dispose of Blomberg as War Minister. Hitler ordered Blomberg to have the marriage annulled to avoid a scandal and to preserve the integrity of the German Army. Blomberg refused to annul the marriage, but after Göring threatened to make his wife's past public knowledge, he resigned from his posts on 27 January 1938.

== Fritsch affair ==
The events surrounding Blomberg's marriage inspired Göring and Schutzstaffel (SS) chief Heinrich Himmler to arrange a similar affair for Werner von Fritsch, the commander-in-chief of the German Army. Göring did not want Fritsch to become the successor to Blomberg and thus Göring's superior. Himmler wanted to strengthen his paramilitary SS by weakening the Wehrmacht, the regular German armed forces, and its aristocratic generals. In 1936, Reinhard Heydrich had prepared a file on Fritsch containing allegations of homosexuality and had passed the information on to Hitler, who had rejected it and ordered Heydrich to destroy the file. However, Heydrich did not do so. In 1938, Heydrich resurrected the old file on Fritsch, who was again accused of being a homosexual by Himmler. It was reported that Fritsch had been encouraged by General Ludwig Beck to carry out a military putsch against Hitler's regime, but that he declined and resigned on 4 February 1938, to be replaced by Walther von Brauchitsch, whom Fritsch had recommended for the post.

== Reorganisation of the army ==
Hitler used the situation to transfer the duties of the Ministry of War to a new organisation, the Oberkommando der Wehrmacht (OKW), and to Wilhelm Keitel, who became the new head of the OKW on 4 February 1938. That weakened the traditional Army High Command (OKH), which was now subordinated to the OKW.

Hitler took further advantage of the situation by replacing several generals and ministers with men even more loyal to him, and took more effective de facto control of the Wehrmacht, which de jure he already commanded. Some senior officers of the Wehrmacht protested against the changes, most notably Beck, who circulated a petition signed by Colonel General Gerd von Rundstedt and others. After the German defeat at the Battle of Moscow in December 1941, Hitler took personal command of the Wehrmacht through the OKW, and appointed himself as commander of the OKH after relieving Brauchitsch. Hitler then began actively presiding over the OKW, where Keitel never dared to oppose him.

== Disproving the charges against Fritsch ==
However, it soon became known that the charges against Fritsch were false. The information in the file was, in fact, about a Rittmeister (cavalry captain) with a similar name, Achim von Frisch. Himmler and Heydrich still pursued the case, conveniently discovering an individual called Hans Schmidt to serve as a witness in support of the charge. The Wehrmacht demanded a court of honour of officers to examine the Blomberg–Fritsch affair, as it had come to be known. The proceedings were presided over by Göring. Schmidt claimed to recognise Fritsch as an officer whom he had witnessed in a homosexual act in a public lavatory with a man, known in translation as "Bavarian Joe". However, Schmidt was exposed as a notorious criminal whose Berlin gang had specialised in the blackmail of homosexuals.

Members of the German officer corps were appalled at the mistreatment of Fritsch, and at the next meeting, Himmler, Göring, and even Hitler might have come under pressure from them, as the case against Fritsch was seen as weak. The Anschluss, the successful annexation of Austria shortly thereafter, silenced the critics. Beck resigned on 18 August 1938, and Rundstedt obtained permission to retire in October 1938. Schmidt withdrew his accusations against Fritsch, and he was formally acquitted on 18 March, but the damage to his reputation had been done. Although the Army demanded he be restored to his former position as commander-in-chief, Hitler would only make him an honorary colonel of an artillery regiment. Just after the German invasion of Poland in September 1939, Fritsch was inspecting front line troops when he was shot by a Polish bullet (either a machine gun or a sharpshooter) in the leg and died.

== See also ==
- Hossbach Memorandum
