= 1st Division (Reichswehr) =

- 1. Division
- Active: 1921–1934
- Disbanded: October 1934
- Country: Weimar Republic
- Branch: Reichsheer
- Type: Infantry
- Size: Division
- Part of: Gruppenkommando 1
- Garrison/HQ: Wehrkreis I: Königsberg

Commanders
- Notable commanders: Werner von Blomberg; Walther von Brauchitsch

The 1st Division was a unit of the Reichswehr, the armed forces of Germany during the Weimar Republic.

== Creation ==
In the Order of 31 July 1920 for the Reduction of the Army (to comply with the upper limits on the size of the military contained in the Treaty of Versailles), it was determined that in every Wehrkreis (military district) a division would be established by 1 October 1920. The 1st Division was formed in January 1921 out of the Reichswehr's 1st and 20th Brigades, both part of the former Übergangsheer (Transition Army).

It consisted of 3 infantry regiments, the 1st, 2nd, and 3rd (Prussian) Infantry Regiments. It also included the 1st (Prussian) Artillery Regiment, an engineering battalion, a signals battalion, a transportation battalion, and a medical battalion. It was subordinated to Gruppenkommando 1.

The commander of Wehrkreis I was simultaneously the commander of the 1st Division. For the leadership of the troops, an Infanterieführer and an Artillerieführer were appointed, both subordinated to the commander of the division.

The unit ceased to exist as such after October 1934, and its subordinate units were transferred to the 11 new divisions created in that year. The 1st (Prussian) Infantry Regiment provided the personnel for the infantry regiments of the 1st Infantry Division of the newly created Wehrmacht.

== Organization ==
- 1st (Prussian) Infantry Regiment
- 2nd (Prussian) Infantry Regiment
- 3rd (Prussian) Infantry Regiment
- 1st (Prussian) Artillery Regiment
- Pioneer Battalion
- Signals Battalion
- Transportation Battalion
- Medical Battalion

== Divisional commanders ==
- General der Infanterie Johannes von Dassel (1 October 1920 - 31 October 1923)
- Generaloberst Wilhelm Heye (1 November 1923 - 31 October 1926)
- General der Infanterie Friedrich Freiherr von Esebeck (1 November 1926 - 30 September 1929)
- General der Infanterie Werner von Blomberg (1 October 1929 - 30 January 1933)
- Generalleutnant Walther von Brauchitsch (1 February 1933 - 1 October 1934)

=== Infanterieführers ===
- Generalleutnant Johannes Ehrhardt (1 October 1920 - 1 January 1922)
- Generalleutnant Hugo van den Bergh (11 January 1922 - 31 January 1924)
- Generalmajor Robert Bürkner (1 February 1924 - 19 March 1925)
- Generalmajor Hermann Niethammer (19 March 1925 - 31 January 1928)
- Generalmajor Albert Fett (1 February 1928 - 31 January 1929)
- Generalmajor Kurt Fischer (1 February 1929 - 31 October 1930)
- Generalleutnant Karl Held (1 November 1930 - 30 September 1931)
- Generalleutnant Karl von Roques (1 October 1931 - 31 January 1933)
- Generalmajor Günther von Niebelschütz (1 February 1933 - 15 October 1935)

== Garrison ==
The divisional headquarters was in Königsberg.
