= Otto Hasse (general) =

German general (1871–1942)

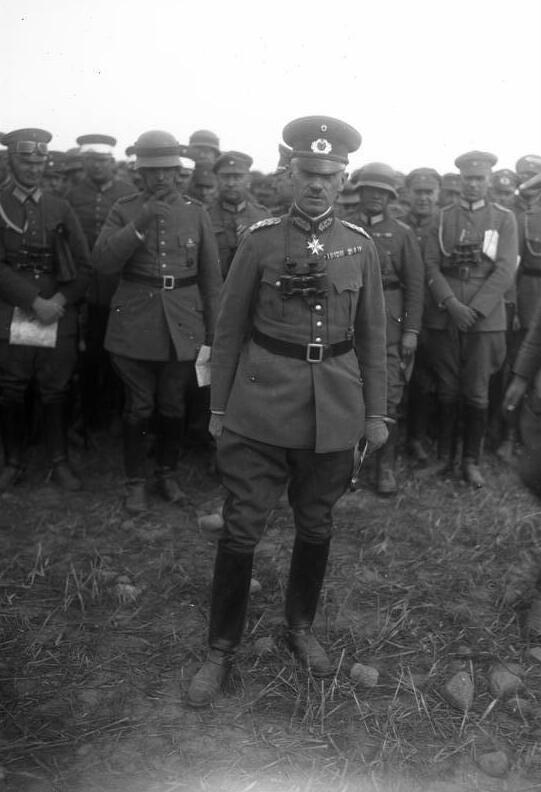
Otto Hasse (1928)

Otto Hasse (21 June 1871 in Schlawe – 28 September 1942 in Berlin-Grunewald) was a German General of the Infantry and from 1923 to 1925 Chief of the Truppenamt.

== Life ==
Hasse entered the army on 27 September 1890 as a Fahnenjunker in the Infantry Regiment "Graf Kirchbach" (1st Lower Silesian) No. 46 of the Prussian Army in Posen. Before World War I, he served on the General Staff and was assigned to inspect military transport. During the war, he served on several general staffs. On 12 May 1918, he was awarded the Oak Leaves Order of the Pour le Mérite for his work as chief of staff in the X Reserve Corps at the Battle of Kemmel. From 1918 until the end of the year, he was chief of staff of the 1st Army.

He was accepted into the Reichswehr and transferred to the Reichswehr Ministry. In 1922, he was appointed Chief of the Troops Office (TA) and promoted to Major General on 1 February 1923. In 1923, as chief of TA, he was in Moscow for the secret agreements on the Treaty of Rapallo with the Soviet Union regarding cooperation between the Reichswehr and the Red Army. In 1926, he became lieutenant general in command of the 3rd Division and at the same time commander in Military District III. Promoted to General of the Infantry, Hasse was appointed Commander-in-Chief of Group Command I in Berlin on 1 April 1929. In 1932, he retired from active service.

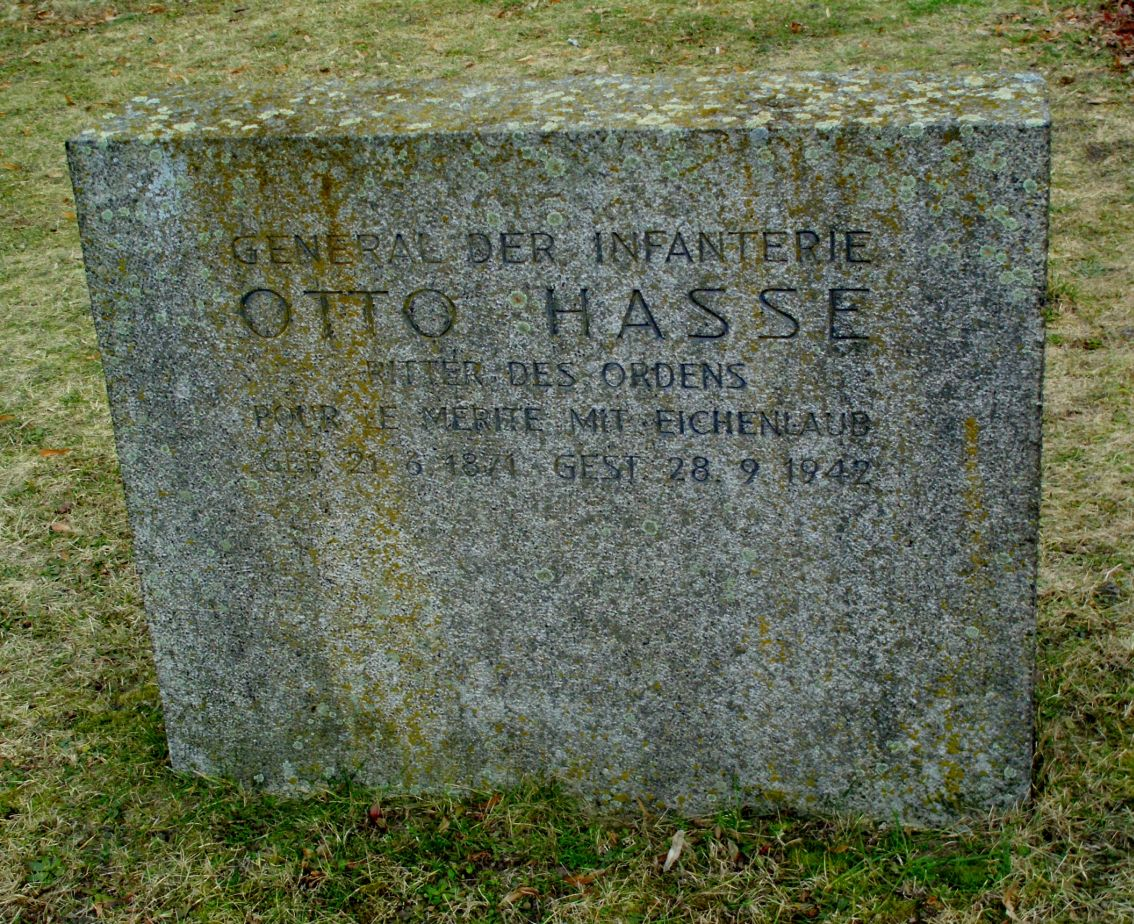
Grave of Otto Hasse at the Berlin Invalidenfriedhof (as of 2013)

Hasse married Anna von Keizer (1873) on 29 October 1903 in Berlin. She was a daughter of the Prussian Lieutenant General Karl von Keizer (1843–1929) and sister of the Major General Karl von Keizer (1871–1929).

His grave has been preserved and he is buried in the Berlin Invalidenfriedhof.

== Awards and decorations ==
- Pour le Mérite with oak leaves
- Order of the Red Eagle IV class with crown
- Knight's Cross of the Royal House Order of Hohenzollern with Swords
- Iron Cross (1914) II and I Class
- Prussian service award cross
- Bavarian Military Order of Merit III class with swords and crown
- Officer's Cross of the Order of Albert with Swords and Crown
- Hanseatic Cross of Hamburg
- Cross for Merit in War of Saxe-Meiningen

== Literature ==
- Dermot Bradley (Hrsg.), Karl-Friedrich Hildebrand, Markus Brockmann: Die Generale des Heeres 1921–1945. Band 5: v. Haack–Hitzfeld. Biblio Verlag, Osnabrück 1999, ISBN 3-7648-2422-0, pp. 164–165.

== Links ==
- Literature by and about Otto Hasse in the German National Library catalogue
