= Truppenamt =

German General Staff, 1919-1935

Troop Office
- Truppenamt
- Active: 11 October 1919–1 July 1935
- Country: Weimar Republic
- Branch: Reichsheer
- Part of: Heeresleitung

Commanders
- Chief of Troop Office: See list

The Truppenamt (lit. 'Troop Office') was the cover organisation for the German General Staff from 1919 until 1935 when the General Staff of the German Army (Heer) was re-created. This subterfuge was deemed necessary in order for Germany to be seen to meet the requirements of the Versailles Treaty. It completely revised German tactical and strategic doctrine and thereby conserved, re-energised, and unified the military thinking and capability of the Reichswehr, later to become the Wehrmacht.

== Original establishment ==
After World War I, the Versailles Treaty specified that the post-war German Army could have a maximum strength of 100,000, of this number only 4000 could be officers. Article 160 determined:

The Great German General Staff and all similar organisations shall be dissolved and may not be reconstituted in any form.

In late 1919, soon after the treaty was signed, Major General Hans von Seeckt, head of the military expert group adjunct to the German delegation, initiated a programme to rethink and rewrite German doctrine as well as reorganise the army to comply with the Versailles rules. On 1 October he became chief of the newly established Truppenamt agency within the Ministry of the Reichswehr. In 1920, when von Seeckt succeeded Walther Reinhardt as Head of the Army Command (Chef der Heeresleitung), this expanded to rebuilding a new army from scratch.

When the General Staff was dissolved in 1919, its Operations Section became the Truppenamt whilst other sections of the staff were transferred to government departments: the history section to the Interior Ministry Reich Archives, the survey and maps section to the Interior Ministry Survey Office, and the transportation section to the Transportation Ministry. The economic and political sections were placed directly under the control of the chief of the Army Command. Thus the core of the General Staff became the four new sections of the Truppenamt:

- T1 (also Abteilung Landesverteidigung) the army section (operations and planning)
- T2 the organisation section
- T3 (also Heeresstatistische Abteilung) the statistical section —(actually intelligence agency)
- T4 the training section

As von Seeckt said at the time "the form changes, the spirit remains the same".

Alongside the Truppenamt in the new army high command were the Weapons Office and branch inspectorates. The relationship between these three entities was very close since between them they determined materiel, doctrine, and training. In the early 1920s, the Truppenamt contained a transportation section, T7 (there never was a T5 or T6). Altogether these three bodies contained two hundred officers, almost all ex-General Staff, who formed an efficient and practical organisation for guiding the rebuilding of the Reichswehr.

== Development of new strategies ==
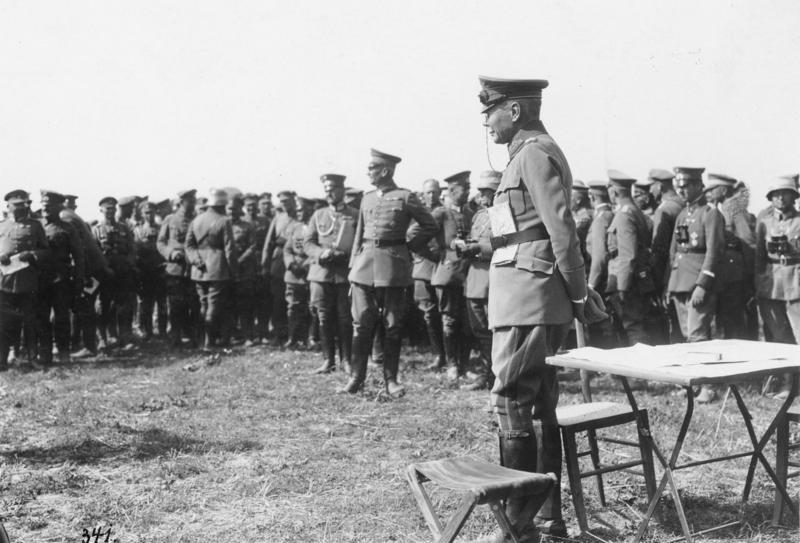
Hans von Seeckt on Reichswehr maneuvers, 1926

One week after the dissolution of the General Staff, von Seeckt started a programme to collect and analyse the experiences of the First World War and to create a new military doctrine for the Reichswehr. The new programme consisted of 57 committees which would study tactics, regulations, equipment, and doctrine. This effort was seen as important to put the experience of war in a broad light and collect this experience whilst it was still fresh. The output of the committees was to be short, concise studies on the newly gained experiences and in particular (a) what new situations arose that had not been considered before; (b) how effective were pre-war views in dealing with these situations; (c) what guidelines were developed for new weaponry during the war; and (d) which new problems put forward by the war have not yet found a solution.

This programme covered diverse topics from military justice and questions of troop morale to river crossings, flamethrowers, and the military weather service. Military leadership was a key focus with seven committees covering different levels and aspects. In order to cover these areas experienced officers were appointed to serve on the committees. These officers were often ex-General Staff but specialist experts were included even if they were not. The T4 section's job was to collect and review the committee outputs and to recommend changes to the committee structure, to military regulations and to doctrinal manuals. Seeing the intense effort being made by the army, the air service within the Truppenamt embarked on a similar programme and by mid-1920 the manpower that made up all these committees was over 500 officers.

Whilst all the big nations revised their tactics post-World War I, it is a notable contrast that Germany put its experienced General Staff officers of captain and above to the task whilst others put juniors of limited experience. For example, the UK assigned the task of rewriting the infantry manual to Basil H Liddell Hart, a 24-year-old lieutenant of limited experience. Even here, the War Office reinserted chapters from the 1911 manual where it deemed appropriate.

Most of the output of the committees has been lost but where it still exists there is a clear link to the new regulations and manuals that started to be issued in 1921. By 1923, the major outputs of this work were completed and the results show up in new manuals issued from that time which demonstrate a high level of tactical thought. Experience from World War I was incorporated as seen in the new infantry regulation of October 1922 where 10-12 squads included a light machine gun with the rifle section and fluid fire-and-manoeuvre stormtroop tactics are endorsed. It is also important to note that the manuals do not limit themselves to the armaments allowed by the Versailles Treaty envisaging tactics using forbidden infantry cannons for example. It is here that we see explicit strategic capabilities being built into the new unified doctrines, so such things as cross-training requirements being built into regulations; e.g. transport troops being required to train a set number of wagon drivers as cannon gunners and as engineers specialising in bridges.

Albert Kesselring, later a field marshal, served in both T1 and T4 at this critical time, as did many other influential generals, and described it as a professional schooling for him.

== Transition to the new Reichswehr ==
With manuals and regulations now in place (even if under constant revision from this new base), the Truppenamt set about reshaping the new army to fit its treaty constraints and its new doctrinal approach. The "triangular" infantry division replaced the "square division", with no brigade-level staff and with three regiments instead of four. Numbers in support forces such as artillery, reconnaissance, transport, and signals all increased, with control in many cases pushed down the organisation. All of this related to the new "war of movement" doctrine that had been adopted. The Wehrmacht infantry division in 1939 showed very few changes from the patterns outlined in 1921. The cavalry division was similarly reinforced with support arms and armoured cars, making it capable of independent operations deep behind enemy lines.

The Truppenamt turned some of the Versailles limitations into advantages. The very limited number of officers forced it to rethink the roles at headquarters, and this dovetailed with the doctrine of decision at the front by those who can see the enemy. Correspondingly, despite a Versailles limit of 33 officers in a divisional HQ, the Germans planned to have 30 - in stark contrast to a US divisional staff of 79. Again, this fitted with a force which would be attacking and making many more decisions outside of the headquarters, which could therefore be leaner. The Versailles Treaty placed no limitations on NCO numbers, and by 1922 the Reichswehr had over 50% of enlisted manpower at NCO ranks, leaving only 36,000 privates. The high quality of German soldiers, made possible by the much reduced numbers forced by the treaty, meant that the Reichswehr could employ NCOs in junior-officer roles (as platoon leaders, for example). This had two effects:

- When the Germans officially re-armed in 1933-34 they could easily promote these NCOs to officer positions as the army expanded.
- A tradition developed of much greater leadership, responsibility, and capability below the officer level, which fitted with the delegated-authority doctrine necessary for Bewegungskrieg (war of movement), which calls for independent judgement and fast local decision-making.

The increased demands upon NCOs required the new army to treat them differently than the old Imperial had - in order to support them in their efforts. Hence all NCOs were now to have a barracks-room of their own and all soldiers were to be much better accommodated and trained than before. In the 1920s the Reichswehr often distributed soldiers throughout the country in battalion- and regiment-sized groups, only forming larger units for occasional exercises. This was part of the Truppenamt's plan to train squads, platoons and companies in the new regulations and doctrines and when ready then combining them in battalion and regimental exercises. The battalion and regimental exercises started in 1924, and the first divisional exercises in 1926. During this time the Truppenamt had the task of ensuring that old "trench warfare" and "positional warfare" tactics did not creep back into use. Cross-training régimes were reviewed, long-length operational order-writing was eliminated, and attack styles that took too long to prepare were eliminated. Innovation and flexibility for mobile warfare were stressed over the carefully planned methods used in static warfare.

== Chiefs of Troop Office (1919–1935) ==
No.	Portrait	Chefs der Truppenamt	Took office	Left office	Time in office
1	Hans von Seeckt	Generalmajor; Hans von Seeckt (1866–1936)	11 October 1919	26 March 1920	167 days
2	Wilhelm Heye	Generalmajor; Wilhelm Heye (1869–1947)	26 March 1920	January 31 1923	2 years, 10 months
3	Otto Hasse	Generalmajor; Otto Hasse (1871–1942)	February, 1 1923	October 31 1925	2 years, 8 months
4	Georg Wetzell	Generalmajor; Georg Wetzell (1869–1947)	November 1 1925	27 January 1927	1 year, 3 months
5	Werner von Blomberg	Generalmajor; Werner von Blomberg (1878–1946)	27 January 1927	30 September 1929	2 years, 246 days
6	Baron Kurt von Hammerstein-Equord	Generalmajor; Baron Kurt von Hammerstein-Equord (1878–1943)	30 September 1929	31 October 1930	1 year, 31 days
7	Wilhelm Adam	Generalmajor; Wilhelm Adam (1877–1949)	31 October 1930	30 September 1933	2 years, 334 days
8	Ludwig Beck	Generalmajor; Ludwig Beck (1880–1944)	1 October 1933	1 July 1935	1 year, 273 days
