= Wilhelm Adam (general) =

German general (1877–1949)

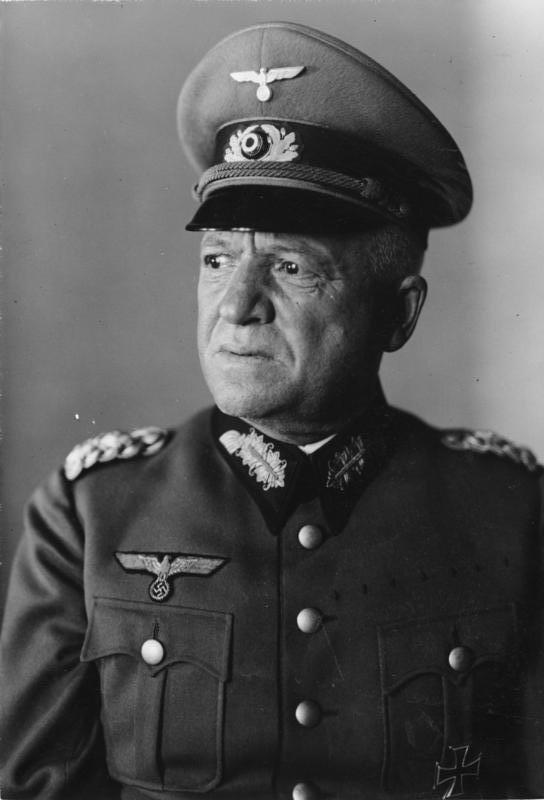
- Adam in 1938
- Born: 15 September 1877; Ansbach, East Franconia, Kingdom of Bavaria, German Empire
- Died: 8 April 1949 (aged 71); Garmisch-Partenkirchen, Bavaria, Allied-occupied Germany
- Burial place: Partenkirchen Municipal Cemetery (Garmisch-Partenkirchen District, Bavaria)
- Relatives: ∞ 1906 Isabella Buchner
- Military career
- Allegiance: Kingdom of Bavaria; German Empire; Weimar Republic; Nazi Germany
- Branch: (Kingdom of Bavaria) Bavarian Army; Imperial German Army; Reichsheer; German Army
- Service years: 1897–1943
- Rank: Generaloberst
- Conflicts: World War I World War II (inactive)

Wilhelm Adam (15 September 1877 – 8 April 1949) was a German general who served in the Bavarian Army, the Imperial German Army, the Reichswehr and the Wehrmacht.

== Life ==
Wilhelm Adam was the son of Protestant merchant Theodor Adam (d. 11 May 1883) and his wife Margarethe, née Engerer (d. 8 February 1906). His stepfather was wealthy merchant Paul Baumgart. He attended the Humanistic Gymnasium in Amberg and Ansbach, achieved his Abitur in June 1897 and entered the Royal Bavarian Army on 19 July 1897 as an officer candidate. He was assigned to the Royal Bavarian Railway Battalion. On 21 September 1902, he was transferred to the Royal Bavarian Telegraph Battalion. On 22 March 1906, he returned to the Royal Bavarian Railway Battalion.

On 1 October 1907, he was seconded to the Bavarian War Academy in Munich. On 9 March 1908, he was commanded to the Ingolstadt fortifications. On 20 September 1910, he was transferred to the Bavarian General Staff and served with the Central Office. On 1 October 1912, he was then transferred to the 3rd Royal Bavarian Pioneer Battalion and was appointed commander of the 3rd Company. On 8 August 1914, he was appointed commander of the 2nd Company/Bavarian Field Pioneer Battalion.

During World War I, Adam fought with his Bavarian pioneer company, but only for a short period. On 7 September 1914, Adam became a General Staff Officer on the Staff of the Army Detachment Falkenhausen. On 24 June 1918, Major Adam was appointed battalion commander with the 17th Royal Bavarian Pioneer Battalion, subordinated to the 1st (Royal Bavarian) Reserve Division. With the end of the war, Adam served in various posts within the Reichswehr, from posts such as a liaison officer to the Bavarian Military Ministry and being an infantry battalion commander of the 3rd Battalion/20th (Bavarian) Infantry Regiment from 1 April 1923 to 30 September 1924.

From 1 October 1930 to 30 September 1933, Adam was Chief of the Troop Office. On 1 October 1933, he was appointed commander of the 7th Division in Munich and was also at the same time commanding Military District VII. On 16 May 1935, he was appointed commanding general of the 7th Army Corps (München). On 1 October 1935, he was appointed commander of the new Wehrmachtsakademie. On 15 November 1938, he was placed at disposal of the Oberkommando des Heeres.

Adam retired on 31 December 1938 with the statutory pension and the right to wear the uniform of Mountain Infantry (Gebirgsjäger) Regiment 98 (stationed at the time in Mittenwald and Garmisch-Partenkirchen, as he was already regarded—during his time in the Reichswehr—as a proponent of the mountain troops), but he was recalled for service on 26 August 1939 (placed at disposal of the Heer), without receiving a command throughout the war. On 31 May 1943, his mobilization order was rescinded.

== Marriage ==
On 29 September 1906, 1st Lieutenant Adam married his Catholic fiancée Isabella "Ella" Buchner (1885–1970), daughter of the pharmacy owner Heinrich Buchner. They would have two sons:

- Hermann Willi (born 13 September 1911 in Munich), Lieutenant Colonel and general staff officer of the Wehrmacht (promoted 1 June 1944), killed in action on 26 August 1944 between Gura Galbenei and Caracui in Bessarabia
- Werner (born 14 October 1918 in Munich), 2nd Lieutenant with the Reconnaissance Battalion 3, killed in action on 2 September 1939 in Poledno

== Memoir ==
Adam's unpublished memoir was preserved for many years after the war in a Bavarian monastery. It is now in the Institute of Contemporary History archives in Munich as file ED109/2.

== Bundeswehr ==
His widow did not consent to the naming of a barracks in Garmisch-Partenkirchen after him—a proposal planned and put forward by the Bundeswehr in the 1950s.

== Promotions ==
- 19 July 1897 Fahnenjunker (Officer Candidate)
- 25 January 1898 Fahnrich (Officer Cadet)
- 10 March 1899 Leutnant (2nd Lieutenant)
- 28 October 1905 Oberleutnant (1st Lieutenant)
- 1 October 1911 Hauptmann (Captain) without Patent
  - 31 March 1916 received Patent from 25 October 1913
- 14 December 1917 Major without Patent
  - 26 September 1919 received Patent from 18 August 1918
  - 1 February 1922 received Rank Seniority (RDA) from 18 August 1917
- 1 February 1923 Oberstleutnant (Lieutenant Colonel)
  - 17 March 1924 received new and improved Rank Seniority (RDA) from 15 November 1922
- 1 February 1927 Oberst (Colonel)
- 1 February 1930 Generalmajor (Major General)
- 1 December 1931 Generalleutnant (Lieutenant General)
- 20 April 1935 General der Infanterie (General of the Infantry) with effect and Rank Seniority (RDA) from 1 April 1935
- 31 December 1938 Charakter als Generaloberst (Honorary Colonel General) with effect from 30 November 1938
- 26 August 1939 Charakter als Generaloberst zur Verfügung (Brevet Colonel General at disposal) with Rank Seniority (RDA) from 1 January 1939

== Awards and decorations ==
- Prince Regent Luitpold Jubilee Medal (Jubiläumsmedaille für die bayerische Armee) on 22 March 1905
- Iron Cross (1914), 2nd and 1st Class
  - 2nd Class on 22 September 1914
  - 1st Class on 18 May 1915
- Military Merit Order (Bavaria), 4th Class with Crown and Swords (BMV4aX/BM4XKr) on 11 November 1914
- Saxon Albert Order, Knight's Cross 1st Class with Swords (SA3aX) on 29 May 1916
- Military Merit Order (Bavaria), 1st Class with Swords (BMV3bX/BM3X)
- Bavarian Long Service Cross, II. Class for 24 years (BDK2/BD2)
- Honour Cross of the World War 1914/1918 with Swords
- Wehrmacht Long Service Award, 4th to 1st Class on 2 October 1936
- Order of Merit (Chile), Grand Officer in 1938
- Hungarian Order of Merit, Grand Cross

== Sources ==
- German Federal Archives: BArch PERS 6/67 and PERS 6/299305

== Literature ==
- Hackl, Othmar: Die Bayerische Kriegsakademie (1867–1914). C.H. Beck´sche Verlagsbuchhandlung, München 1989, ISBN 3-406-10490-8, p. 393.
- Heuer, Gerd F.: Die Generalobersten des Heeres. Inhaber höchster deutscher Kommandostellen. Moewig, Rastatt 1988, ISBN 3-8118-1049-9, p. 1–8.
- Siegler, Fritz von (1953). "Adam, Wilhelm". Neue Deutsche Biographie (in German). Vol. 1. Berlin: Duncker & Humblot. pp. 53–54. (full text online).
- Solomon, Robert (2002). Who's Who in Nazi Germany. Psychology Press. ISBN 9780415260381.
- Stahl, Friedrich-Christian: Generaloberst Wilhelm Adam. In: Gerd R. Ueberschär (Hrsg.): Hitlers militärische Elite. 68 Lebensläufe. Wissenschaftliche Buchgesellschaft, Darmstadt 2011, ISBN 978-3-534-23980-1, p. 1–8.
