= Junker (Prussia) =

Member of the landed nobility

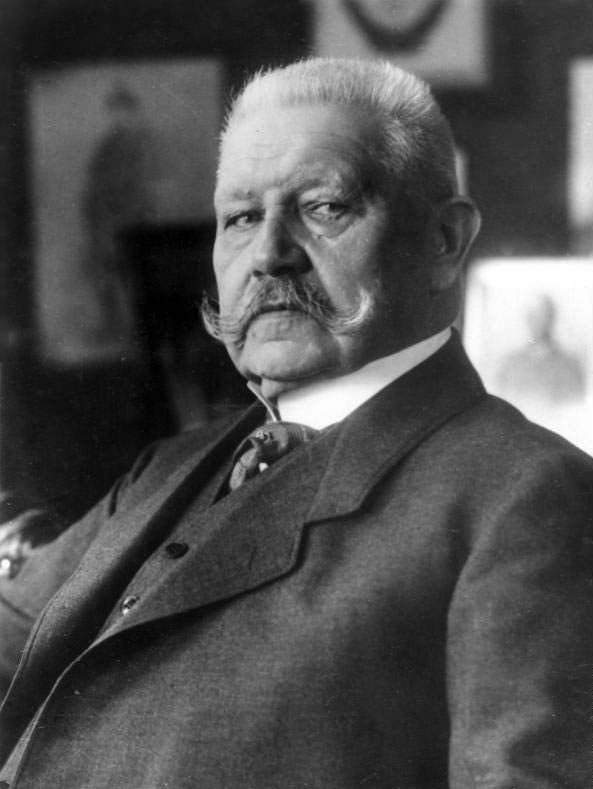
Paul von Hindenburg, a major military and political figure who was born into a wealthy Junker family

Prussian Junkers (/ˈjʊŋkər/; German: [ˈjʊŋkɐ]) were members of the landed nobility in the eastern part of Prussia from the late Middle Ages until the end of World War II. The large manorial estates over which Junkers had special rights of legal jurisdiction and law enforcement were initially worked by serfs in inherited servitude. Over time, the manors moved towards market agriculture and serfdom was abolished in 1807, but semi-feudal elements that contrasted sharply with agricultural practices in the rest of Germany remained on the large-scale Junker estates.

In the early eighteenth century, Junkers solidified a prominent role in the Prussian government and military. They filled many high-ranking positions in the administration of the state and provided the majority of the army's officers. When Prussia obtained a constitution mid-century, Junkers came to dominate both houses of the parliament, giving them an all but certain veto power over legislation. Under the German Empire (1871–1918), the Junkers' economic situation worsened and many estates fell into debt, but their political position remained strong, and their values of military honour, duty and loyalty were emulated by Prussia's upper classes.

During the Weimar Republic era (1918–1933), Junkers lost much of their power in the military and politics, although they retained enough influence to obtain significant subsidies for their indebted estates through the Eastern Aid program. Although many Junkers held important military positions under the Nazi government (1933–1945), there were others who were involved in the resistance against Adolf Hitler. At the end of World War II, the Russians drove Junkers from their estates and destroyed their manors. A large percentage of former Junker land was in the region from which Germans were expelled after it was ceded to Poland or the USSR. In what became East Germany, all landholdings over 100 acres were expropriated. Junkers as a class ceased to exist in 1945.

== History ==
=== Origins ===
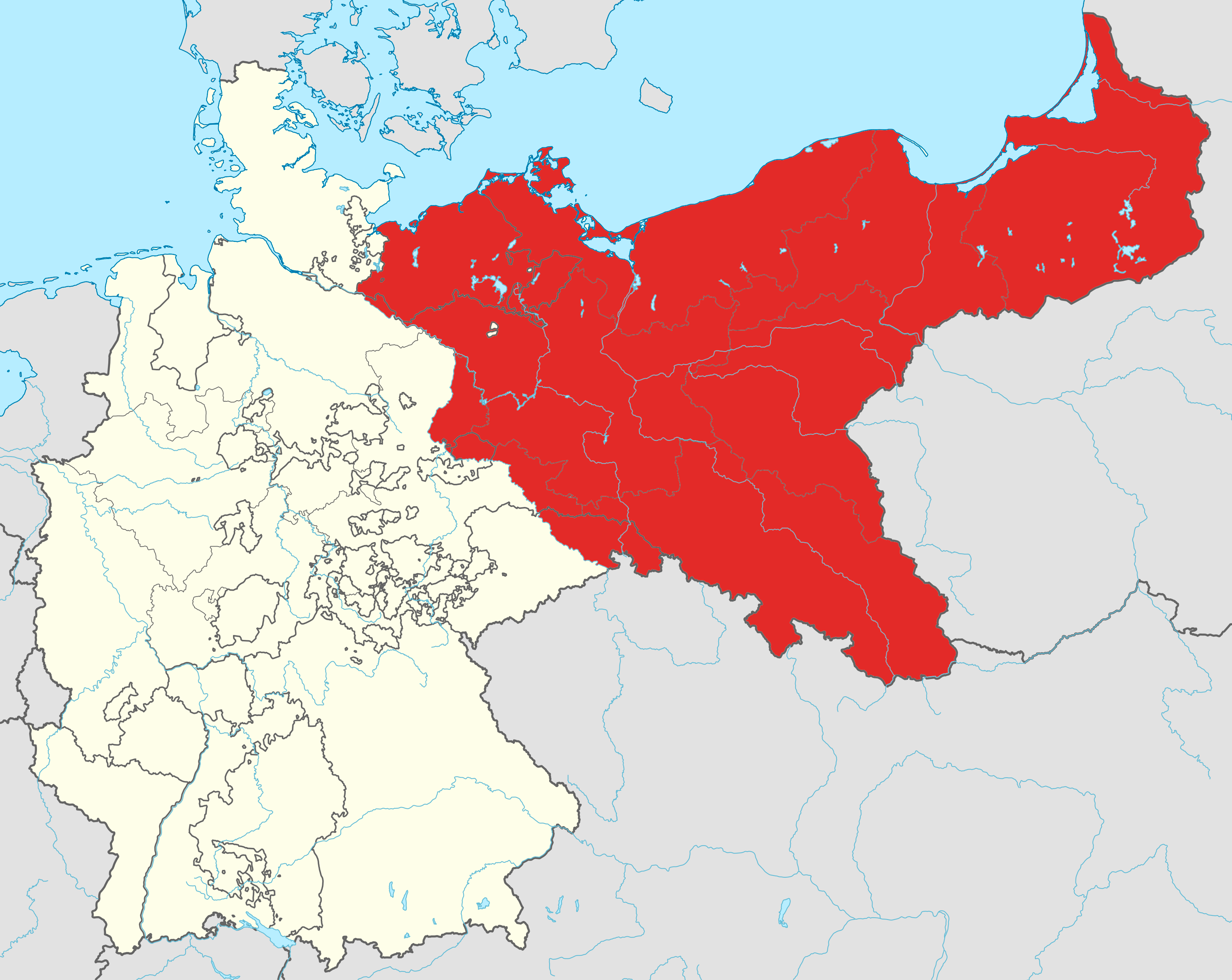
East Elbia (in red), the home of the Junkers, as part of the German Empire. It included the Prussian provinces of Brandenburg, Pomerania, Silesia, East Prussia, West Prussia, Posen, and the eastern parts of Saxony and the Kingdom of Saxony, plus the states of Mecklenburg-Schwerin and Mecklenburg-Strelitz.

Prussian Junkers were descendants of the knights who took part in the Germanic settlement of the Slavic regions east of the Elbe river (East Elbia) during the early Middle Ages. The class grew out of the feudal nobility that developed under the manorial system of the late Middle Ages. The Junkers' land was worked by a once-free peasantry that paid rents in cash or labour under a type of serfdom known as inherited servitude (Erbuntertänigkeit). By the end of the Thirty Years' War in 1648, almost all peasants in the region were no longer free. They were subject to compulsory labour (corvée), could be forbidden to move away from the manor and forced to return if they did. Penalties for misbehaviour went as far as flogging and imprisonment. The Junkers were able to impose the system because over time they had wrested significant legal powers from their territorial lords. Their rights of jurisdiction and law enforcement on their manors made them self-contained political entities over which the Junkers were the sovereign authority. As the manors became demesne farms that produced grain, wool and livestock for the market, Junkers used pressure tactics to evict peasants from the land in order to increase the acreage they could cultivate. The change also took the grain trade away from the cities and permanently weakened the region's middle class. The still feudal situation in the east contrasted sharply with the western parts of Prussia and Germany where a mercantile middle class was forming.

=== Pre-imperial period ===
Under the Hohenzollern dynasty, which ruled both Brandenburg and Prussia from 1618, the crown and the Junkers were in a relationship of mutual dependence whose balance varied significantly over time. Junkers received positions of honour and economic benefit from the state, which in turn received administrative and military service from the Junkers. The Thirty Years' War left the Junkers as a class in significant financial difficulty. Frederick William, from 1640 to 1688 the Duke of Prussia and Elector of Brandenburg (called the "Great Elector"), instituted reforms after the war which left few Junkers in his administration. In Brandenburg between 1640 and 1740, only 10% of the top positions in the court, diplomatic corps and military were filled by its landed nobility. In addition, the Junkers' special judicial powers came increasingly under the legal system and as a result were less arbitrary. Frederick William I, King in Prussia from 1688 to 1740 and known as the "Soldier King", divided Prussia into cantons and structured the army based on them, with officers coming from the Junker class and soldiers from the peasantry. In recompense for the peasants' service, the King barred landowners from taking peasant land.

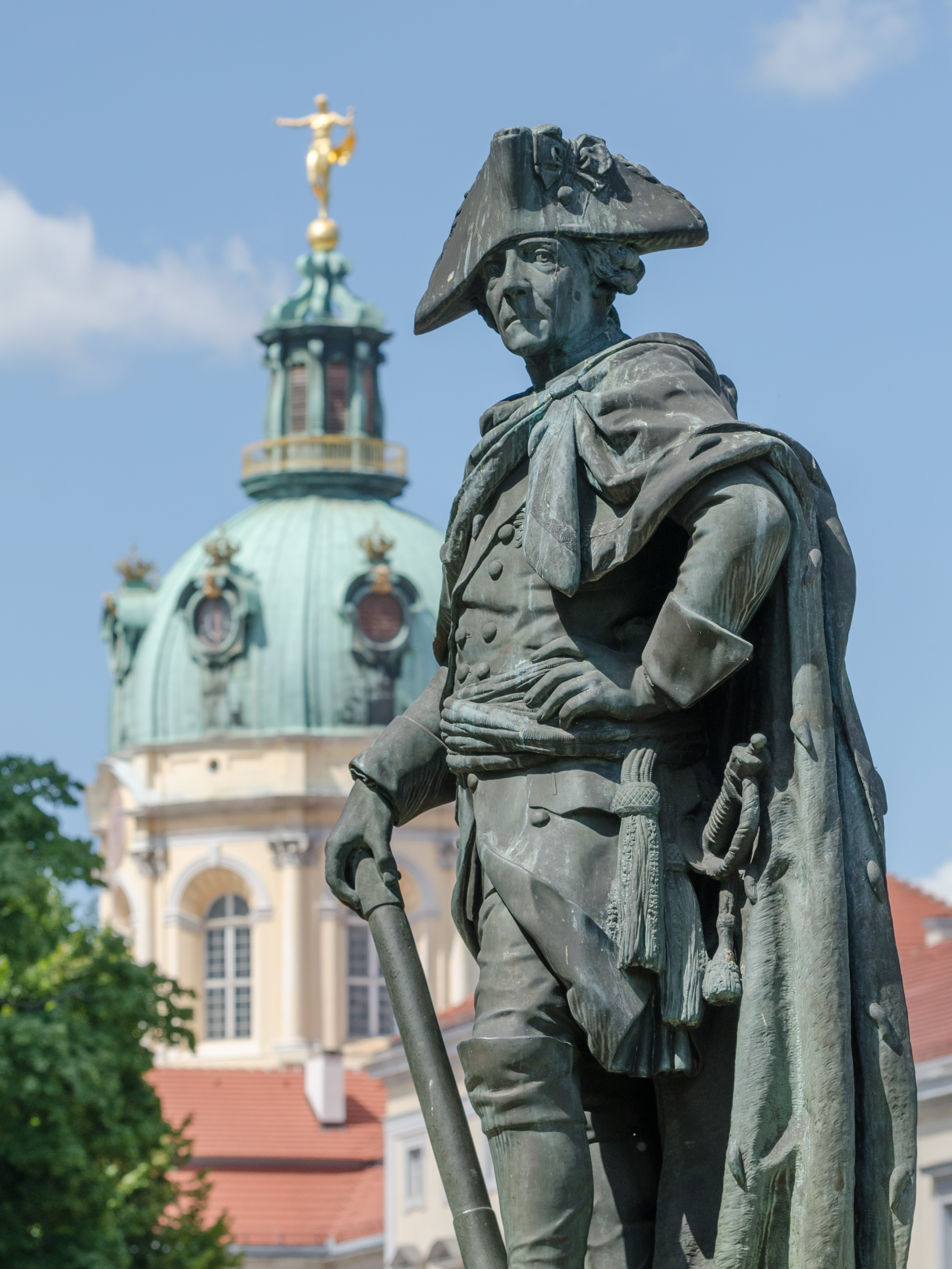
Statue of Frederick the Great in front of the Charlottenburg Palace, Berlin. He restored Junker power and status in the 18th century.

Frederick William's son and successor, Frederick II (Frederick the Great, ruled 1740–1788), gave the Junkers both monetary and political aid through loans and legal changes which amounted to a "re-feudalization of Prussia". They retained their status on the manors, including dispensing patrimonial justice, and were put at the forefront of access to positions with the state. The Prussian Legal Code of 1794, which Frederick had initiated, defined the Junkers as a separate estate with its own privileges and limits. Junkers could not engage in bourgeois activities, sell their estates to anyone not in the nobility or marry contrary to their station. The code also gave civil servants the legal status of a corporate body separate from the bourgeois and aristocratic estates, essentially making them "the first citizens of the state". Under Frederick, Junkers dominated their local districts as heads of the manor and as Landräte, the administrative officers who represented local interests and served as officials of the state. As military officers, Junkers controlled the cantons and garrisons. Their positions in politics and the military put them at the top of the social sphere as well.

Prussia undertook significant reforms to its government and military after its defeats during the Napoleonic Wars (1803–1815). Although they were intended to bring Prussia more in line with the Enlightenment ideals that had reshaped other European countries, Junkers emerged from the reforms stronger than before. In the agricultural sector, the reforms abolished serfdom, allowed non-nobles to buy land and paved the way for the introduction of agrarian capitalism. The resulting land cessions that released peasants from the services they owed to the manorial lords were used by many Junkers as an opportunity to buy the land and expand their estates. By blocking other reforms they were able to retain their time-honoured privileges: patrimonial jurisdiction on the manors was not lost until the revolutions of 1848, manorial exemption from property taxes remained in effect until 1861 – although even then it was generally a local official close to the lord of the manor who set the rate – and police jurisdiction, which was briefly rescinded during the 1848 revolutions, lasted until 1872.

In the decades after the 1848 revolution, many younger Junker sons were sent to universities as a way to help preserve their status and improve their financial outlooks. Graduates went on to high positions in the bureaucracy and officer corps. By 1859 three out of four senior officers in the German army were nobles, as were nine out of ten generals.

King Frederick William IV unilaterally enacted a constitution for Prussia in 1848 which included an elected upper house (Herrenhaus), although by 1853 the constitution had been amended so that all members were appointed by the king. As a result of pressure exerted by the nobility, the life-members included 90 who were proposed (Präsentationsrecht) by the "old and established" estates and who were primarily Junkers. Since legislation required the support of the king and both houses of the Prussian parliament, the 90 Junkers obtained, according to historian Hans-Ulrich Wehler, "an insurmountable veto power in the legislative process" that lasted until 1918.

=== German Empire ===
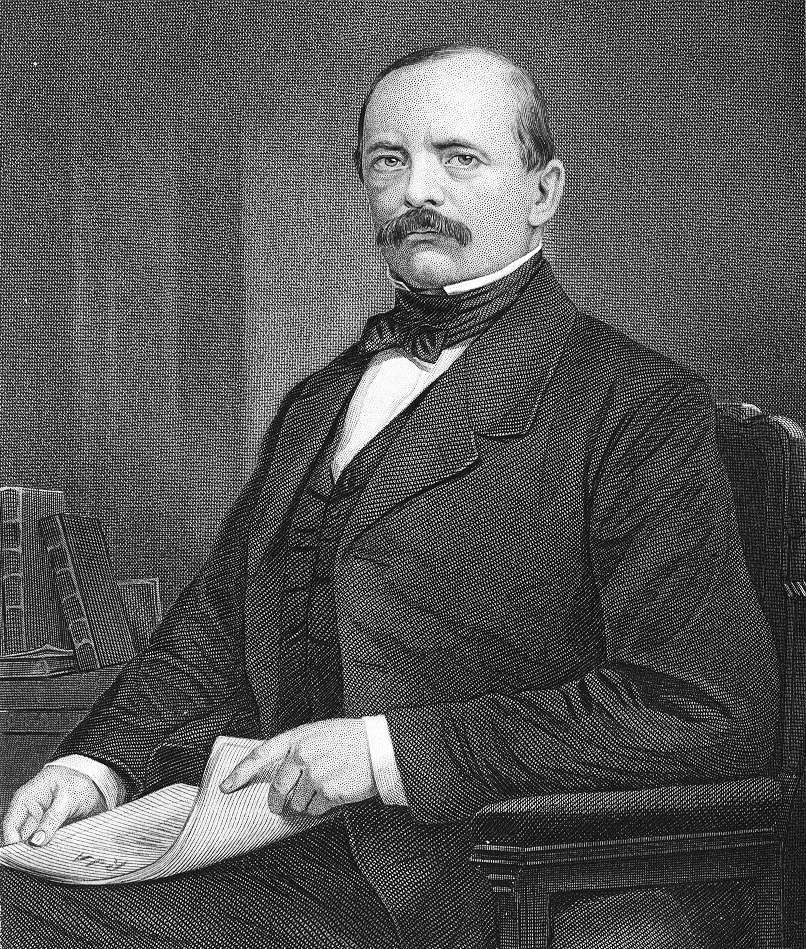
Otto von Bismarck in 1873. Although from a Junker family, his policies did not always align with their interests.

Otto von Bismarck, Germany's first chancellor, came from an old Junker family, but in many ways he was not typical of the class. He rejected corporatism – a system in which political representation is through economic or professional groups such as large landholders – and resisted the Junker class solidarity that sometimes stood in the way of what he saw as Germany's best interests. Conservatives as a result never fully trusted him any more than did the liberals who had championed the German unification that he was instrumental in bringing about in 1871.

The creation of the German Empire in 1871 after France's defeat in the Franco-Prussian War increased the respect that the middle class had for the state and its institutions, especially the Junker-dominated military. The Junkers nevertheless lost some of their former local authority under the 1872 law that took away the feudal police and judicial powers that they had long had on their manors, and again as a result of the 1892 reform that put the districts that had been controlled by one landowner on the same legal footing as municipalities. In spite of the new laws, Junkers were able to maintain much of their former dominance on their estates, thanks in large part to their overall political strength in the Empire. They continued to hold many local Landrat positions, the Prussian House of Lords remained under their control, and the Prussian three-class franchise, which weighted votes based on the amount of taxes paid, gave them a position of dominance in the Prussian House of Representatives as well.

Two years of rapid economic expansion followed the foundation of the Empire (the Gründerzeit), but the Panic of 1873 ushered in a period of falling prices and deflation that lasted until the mid-1890s and which hit agriculture and the Junkers particularly hard. Junkers were able to use their strength at court and in the government to lobby successfully for the introduction of protective agricultural tariffs in 1879. Bismarck, whose main political base had been with the free-trade National Liberals, broke with them and from that point on allied with the German Conservative Party. It had been founded in 1876 to represent agricultural interests, with most of its membership coming from the eastern provinces of Prussia. In 1893, the Junkers were among those who organized the German Agrarian League in response to Chancellor Leo von Caprivi's (1890–1894) reversal of Bismarck's high-tariff policies. The League, whose leadership came primarily from the Junkers, served as agriculture's chief pressure group and was notably antisemitic. It was instrumental in having tariffs raised again in 1902.

Junker influence on politics and the military in imperial Germany was strengthened by the fact that many in the upper classes and bureaucracy aspired to and emulated Junker values. Their "loyalty, piety, duty, devotion to family, ... reverence for tradition and the established order [and] an acute sense of honour" together with their upbringing to be "physically tough, uncomplaining, brave, loyal, and honourable" were part of a strict code of service that made them appear morally certain and above corruption. In Wilhelmine society, military uniforms meant prestige, and the reserve officer had an elevated status. As landowners, Junkers were admired as a class that was holding on to an older way of life and that could be proud even in poverty. They were "communitarian, averse to the bourgeois work ethic although obedient to their own demands of duty". At a time when there was growing scorn for newly rich merchants and industrialists and nostalgia for rootedness in the soil, Junkers were looked on as pre-capitalist and anti-bourgeois. Historian Heinrich August Winkler wrote that "there was a plethora of evidence to support the thesis of the Verjunkerung or ‘feudalization’ of the upper German bourgeoisie", quoting statements from sociologist Max Weber (1864–1920), who saw in their "desire to acquire noble titles and landed estates, imitate a seigneurial lifestyle, achieve the status of reserve officer, cultivate duelling...[that]...the entrepreneurial class of the German bourgeoisie had gone far in adapting itself to aristocratic values". There remained, however, significant differences between eastern Prussia and the more politically progressive and industrialized west of Germany which kept the Empire from developing a unified elite class.

Summarizing the problematic aspects of Junker influence during the period, historian Volker Ullrich wrote:

Certainly, the Prussian Junkers were not the only social group in the German Empire that held antidemocratic and militaristic convictions, nor were they the most staunch advocates of [expansionist] German global policy. Nevertheless, as Dominic Lieven has emphasized, ... they “undoubtedly made a significant contribution to preventing liberal democratization and to fostering a climate of opinion that made it easier for the leadership of the German Empire to decide to go to war in 1914.”

=== Weimar Republic ===
The Junkers were appalled when the German revolution of 1918–1919 overthrew the German monarchy at the end of World War I. Their belief system had always told them that their existence was inextricably tied to the monarchy. The Junker Elard von Oldenburg-Januschau stated that "I felt a world was collapsing and burying under its ruins everything that had been the content of my life". The social power of the Junkers nevertheless remained largely intact during the Weimar Republic. The nobility of East Elbia was able to infiltrate local revolutionary groups and convince their members not to make radical changes to existing laws and institutions. While openly communist workers in Germany's industrial sector fought for public ownership of factories and mines, Eastern agricultural workers and farmers did not seek expropriation of the large Junker estates. The socialist leaders in Berlin were content to leave them untouched as well, since they feared making the already critical food-supply situation worse. The manorial districts that were a key administrative basis for Junker strength also remained in place until 1927, when they were finally abolished.

Junker hold on political offices in the new and democratic Free State of Prussia, however, weakened significantly under its consistently socialist-led governments, which systematically worked to purge anti-republicans from important positions. In a study of five eastern Prussian provinces, the number of Junkers in key offices fell from 203 in 1914 to 35 in 1931, and the percentage of Junkers in Landrat positions dropped from 46.4 to 7.3.

In 1918, the German Conservative Party, which had worked to defend the interests of big agriculture during the Empire, merged into the new German National People's Party (DNVP), which was not dominated by Junkers. They worked instead with the right-wing organizations Stahlhelm and Pan-German League as their political protectors in the new republic. The Junkers threw their weight behind the unsuccessful Kapp Putsch in 1920, and in 1921 two Junker-dominated lobbying groups united to form the Reichslandbund ("Agricultural League"). It fought against tariffs and any other policies that threatened owners of large agricultural estates.

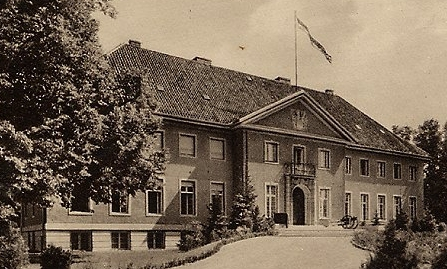
Neudeck manor, then in East Prussia (today Ogrodzieniec, Poland). It was presented to German President Paul von Hindenburg in 1928. The advancing Red Army looted and burned it in 1945.

As the 1920s progressed, the economic position and indebtedness of the Junkers worsened despite high tariffs on rye and wheat. A policy known as Osthilfe ("Eastern Aid"), which lasted from 1926 to 1937, paid out a total of 2.5 billion Reichsmarks in agricultural subsidies in East Elbia, the majority to large landowners. Of the 849 million Reichsmarks given out in 1931 through 1933, for example, 803 million went to estate owners and only 46 million to smaller farms. The imbalance in payments was so large in part because Junkers controlled most of the local government offices that distributed the aid. They also had considerable influence with their fellow Junker, President Paul von Hindenburg (in office 1925 to 1934), and they used it most forcefully in trying to improve their economic situation. Together with the Reichslandbund, the nationalists and the military, the Junkers were able to bring about the fall of Chancellor Heinrich Brüning in 1932, in large part because they disliked his agricultural policies. Their political power was nevertheless further undermined by both the Great Depression, which drove many peasants and agricultural labourers into Nazi ranks, and by Nazi infiltration of the Agricultural League.

Junkers were not a significant force behind the Nazi Party during the Weimar Republic's final years. They were divided, with some repulsed by Nazi use of violence and unwilling to support Adolf Hitler when he came to power, while others were attracted by the Nazis' anti-republicanism, nationalism and militarism.

=== Nazi era ===
There was little change in the number of Junkers in high administrative positions in Prussia between 1933 and 1939 in spite of the Nazis' general distrust of the aristocracy. The Junkers were allowed to keep their land in East Elbia, but they lost their political power as the Nazis took total control of the state.

Many Junkers were field marshals during World War II, most notably Gerd von Rundstedt, Fedor von Bock and Erich von Manstein. Some Junkers used forced labourers from occupied Poland and the Soviet Union on their estates. Although there was no common Junker front against the Nazis, a number of individuals joined the resistance. Helmuth James Graf von Moltke formed the Kreisau Circle as part of the resistance to Nazi rule, and as World War II turned against Germany, several senior Junkers in the Wehrmacht participated in the 20 July plot against Hitler. When the plot failed, 58 of them were either executed, including Erwin von Witzleben and Heinrich Graf von Lehndorff-Steinort, or committed suicide like Henning von Tresckow.

During and after the advance of the Red Army in the closing months of the war, most Germans, including Junkers, fled from the eastern territories that were later turned over to the re-established Republic of Poland – or in the case of northern East Prussia to the USSR – under the terms of the Potsdam Agreement.

=== Post World War II ===
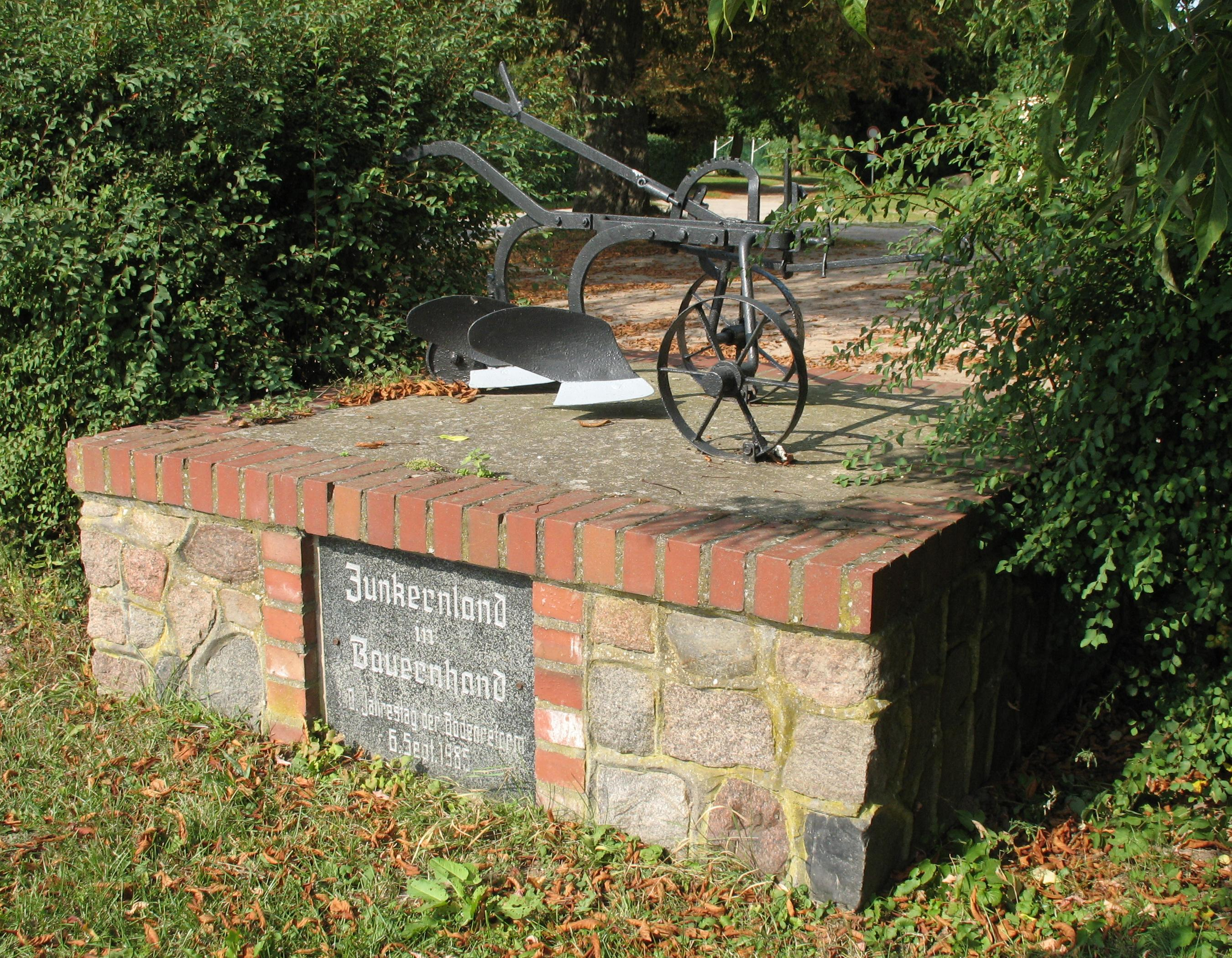
40-year land reform memorial from 1985 in Brandenburg with the "Junkerland in Bauernhand" slogan

After World War II, during the communist land reform of September 1945 in the Soviet Occupation Zone, later East Germany, all private property exceeding 100 hectares (250 acres) was expropriated and then allocated to farmers on the condition that they continue farming. As most of the large estates, especially in Brandenburg and Western Pomerania, had belonged to Junkers, the Socialist Unity Party of Germany (SED) promoted their plans with East German President Wilhelm Pieck's slogan Junkerland in Bauernhand! (Junker land into farmers' hands!). The former owners were accused of war crimes and involvement in the Nazi regime by the Soviet Military Administration and the SED, with many of them being arrested, brutally beaten and interned in NKVD special camps, while their property was plundered and the manor houses demolished. Some were executed.

After German reunification in 1989, some Junkers tried to regain their former estates through civil lawsuits, but German courts upheld the land reforms and rebuffed claims to full compensation, confirming the legal validity of the terms of the Treaty on the Final Settlement with Respect to Germany (Two Plus Four Agreement), by which expropriations of land under Soviet occupation were irreversible. The last decisive case was the unsuccessful lawsuit of Prince Ernst August of Hanover in September 2006, when the Federal Administrative Court decided that the prince had no right to compensation for the seized estates of the House of Hanover around Blankenburg Castle in Saxony-Anhalt. Other families, however, have quietly purchased or leased back their ancestral homes from the current owners (often the German federal government in its role as trustee). A petition for official rehabilitation of the ousted landowners was rejected by the German Bundestag in 2008.

== Use of the term ==
"Junker" acquired its current and often pejorative sense during the 19th century disputes over the domestic policies of the German Empire. The term was used by sociologists such as Max Weber and was adopted by members of the landed class themselves. Chancellor Otto von Bismarck was a noted Junker, although his family hailed from the Altmark region west of the Elbe. The term was also applied to President Paul von Hindenburg, who was gifted Neudeck manor in East Prussia, and to the camarilla around him that urged the appointment of Adolf Hitler as chancellor of Germany. They were personified by men like Hindenburg's son Oskar and Elard von Oldenburg-Januschau, who played central roles in the Eastern Aid scandal of 1932/33.

== Notable Junkers ==
- Otto von Bismarck
- Gebhard Leberecht von Blücher
- Manfred von Richthofen
- Paul von Hindenburg
- Friedrich Wilhelm von Steuben
- Christoph II von Dohna
- Friedrich Wilhelm von Seydlitz
- Alfred von Waldersee
- Alfred von Schlieffen
- Werner von Siemens
- Leonhard Graf von Blumenthal
- Josias von Heeringen
- Heinrich von Kleist
- Joseph von Eichendorff
- Ferdinand von Schill
- Hans Joachim von Zieten
- Ludwig Yorck von Wartenburg
- Heinrich Friedrich Karl vom und zum Stein
- Helmuth von Moltke the Elder
- Helmuth von Moltke the Younger
- Gustav von Wangenheim
- Alexander von Linsingen
- Franz von Hipper
- Karl-Jesko von Puttkamer
- Kurt Freiherr von Hammerstein-Equord
- Claus von Stauffenberg
- Heinrich Graf von Einsiedel
- Günther von Reibnitz
- Alfred von Tirpitz
- Erich von Falkenhayn
- August von Mackensen
- Henning von Tresckow
- Walter von Brauchitsch
- Fedor von Bock
- Oskar von Hindenburg
- Wilhelm von Leeb
- Erich von Manstein
- Hans-Jürgen von Arnim
- Hermann von Eichhorn
- Otto Liman von Sanders
- Helmuth James Graf von Moltke
- Wolfram von Richthofen
- Peter Yorck von Wartenburg
- Marion von Dönhoff
- Elard von Oldenburg-Januschau
- Veruschka von Lehndorff
- Paul Emil von Lettow-Vorbeck
- Kurt von Schleicher
- Hans von Seeckt
- Bernhard von Bülow
- Alexander von Kluck
- Werner von Blomberg
- Lutz Graf Schwerin von Krosigk
- Eberhard von Mackensen
- Wernher von Braun
- Walther von Reichenau
- Walther von Seydlitz-Kurzbach
- Gerhard von Scharnhorst
- August von Gneisenau
- Carl von Clausewitz
- Albrecht von Roon
- Karl vom Stein zum Altenstein
- Eugen Anton Theophil von Podbielski
- Adolf Wild von Hohenborn
- Erwin von Witzleben
- Job von Witzleben (historian)
- Ludwig Freiherr von und zu der Tann-Rathsamhausen
- Hyazinth Graf Strachwitz von Groß-Zauche und Camminetz
- Gottfried Graf von Bismarck-Schönhausen
- Wessel Freytag von Loringhoven
- Günther von Kluge
- Ernst von Weizsäcker
- Ulrich von Hassell
- Heinrich Graf von Lehndorff-Steinort
- Georg von Derfflinger
- Erich von Drygalski
- Ludwig von Wolzogen
- Rudolf von Bennigsen
- Heinrich Freiherr von Lüttwitz
- Remus von Woyrsch
- Gerd von Rundstedt
- Lothar von Richthofen
- Paul Ludwig Ewald von Kleist
- Alfried Krupp von Bohlen und Halbach
- Ferdinand von Sammern-Frankenegg
- Erich von dem Bach-Zelewski
- Franz von Papen
- Joachim von Ribbentrop
- Franz Pfeffer von Salomon
- Werner von Fritsch
- Baldur von Schirach
- Claus von Bülow
- Friedrich Werner von der Schulenburg
- Gustav Krupp von Bohlen und Halbach
- Konstantin von Neurath
- Richard von Weizsacker
- Maximilian von Weichs
- Friedrich Wilhelm von Lindeiner-Wildau
- Chlodwig zu Hohenlohe-Schillingsfürst
- Georg von Hertling
- Ferdinand von Zeppelin
- Hans-Georg von Friedeburg
- Robert Ritter von Greim
- Adolf von Baeyer

== See also ==
- German nobility
- East Elbia
- Jonkheer, the Dutch cognate and rough equivalent
- Junker Party, 19th-century Swedish political movement
