= Oskar von Hindenburg =

German politician and general

- Oskar von Hindenburg, February 1934
- Born: Oskar Wilhelm Robert Paul Ludwig Hellmuth von Beneckendorff und von Hindenburg; 31 January 1883; Königsberg, East Prussia
- Died: 12 February 1960 (aged 77); Bad Harzburg, West Germany
- Burial place: Medingen
- Military career
- Allegiance: German Empire (1903–1918); Weimar Republic (1918–1933); Nazi Germany (1933–1934, 1939–1945)
- Branch: Prussian Army; Reichsheer; German Army
- Service years: 1903–1934, 1939–1945
- Rank: Generalleutnant
- Conflicts: World War I World War II

Oskar Wilhelm Robert Paul Ludwig Hellmuth von Beneckendorff und von Hindenburg (31 January 1883 – 12 February 1960) was a German Generalleutnant. The son and aide-de-camp to Generalfeldmarschall and President Paul von Hindenburg had considerable influence on the appointment of Adolf Hitler as German chancellor in January 1933.

== Early life ==
Oskar von Hindenburg was born in Königsberg, East Prussia (present-day Kaliningrad, Russia), the only son of Paul von Hindenburg (1847–1934) and his wife Gertrud Wilhelmine (1860–1921). He had two sisters, Irmengard Pauline (1880–1948) and Annemarie (1891–1978). In 1921, he married Margarete von Marenholtz (1897–1988); the couple had four children.

== Military career ==
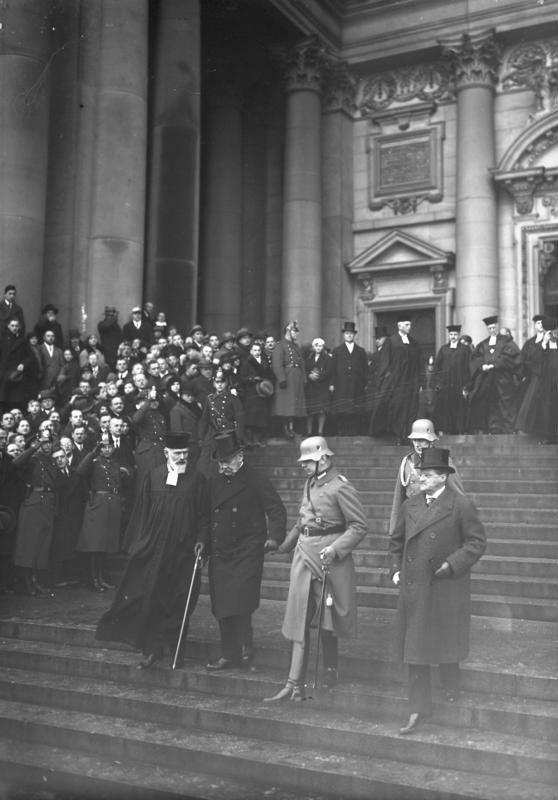
The Reich President leaving Berlin Cathedral with his son and aide-de-camp Oskar von Hindenburg, January 1931

He followed his father into the Prussian Army and joined the 3rd Foot Guards regiment in 1903, where he befriended Kurt von Schleicher. Initially, his career did not prosper, as Hindenburg's superiors considered him to be of low intelligence. Nevertheless, after his father became a German World War I hero upon the battle of Tannenberg, Oskar von Hindenburg's career started to advance thanks to his surname. A General Staff officer at the Armeeoberkommando during the war, he achieved the rank of Hauptmann (Captain) in the 20th Division.

After the war, he continued his career within the newly established German Reichswehr, where he was promoted to major and acted as his father's liaison officer. After his father became the Reich President of Germany in 1925, Major von Hindenburg acted as his father's aide-de-camp. As his father's closest friend and advisor, he exercised considerable power behind the scenes as he largely controlled access to the President. It was in large part due to his friendship with the younger von Hindenburg that von Schleicher became chancellor and one of the elder von Hindenburg's closest advisors.

== Hitler's appointment ==
In a meeting with the "camarilla" around Franz von Papen and State Secretary Otto Meissner on 22 January 1933, Oskar von Hindenburg, who like his father had long been opposed to making Hitler chancellor, was persuaded to support the plan to have Hitler appointed but having von Papen control him from behind the scenes as Vice-Chancellor. At the same time, Oskar was stuck in the major Eastern Aid (Osthilfe) scandal, concerning a Weimar Republic programme for developing the agrarian economy in eastern Germany. Moreover, he was under pressure due to his manor in Neudeck, which the German government, with large contributions from German industrialists on the initiative of Elard von Oldenburg-Januschau, gave to President Hindenburg on the occasion of his 80th birthday on 2 October 1927. The president had titled the deed in the name of his son Oskar, according to his political opponents, ostensibly to avoid payment of inheritance taxes. Shortly after Hitler's appointment, Hindenburg and his descendants were officially exempt from taxes by law.

== World War II ==
Discharged from active military service in the rank of major general in 1934, Oskar von Hindenburg had retired to Neudeck Manor. During World War II, Oskar von Hindenburg was again appointed general commanding in East Prussia, where he supervised several prisoner of war camps. Promoted to Generalleutnant in 1942, he finally requested permission to resign because he considered the position to be a demotion when compared to his previous military and government positions. As a member of the Führerreserve, he lived in Neudeck until the advance of Red Army troops late in the war forced him to flee to his brother-in-law in Medingen. Previously, he had supervised the dismantling of the Tannenberg Memorial honouring his father's 1914 victory over the Russians. He also had his parents' remains moved west. In the 1950s, Polish authorities razed the site, leaving few traces.

== Later life ==
In the Nuremberg trials in January 1947, Oskar von Hindenburg was a witness against Franz von Papen. In 1949, he was on trial on four charges.

In 1956, he won a lawsuit against Süddeutscher Verlag, which in 1954 posthumously published the book by Baron Erwein von Aretin, Crown and Chains. Memories of a Bavarian Nobleman, alleging that in 1930, Oskar von Hindenburg had obtained illegal funding from the Eastern Aid programme. Oskar von Hindenburg lived in Medingen, West Germany after the war. Having suffered a heart attack in early 1960, he travelled to a spa in Bad Harzburg, where he died on 12 February 1960. He was buried at Waldfriedhof Medingen.

== Assessment ==
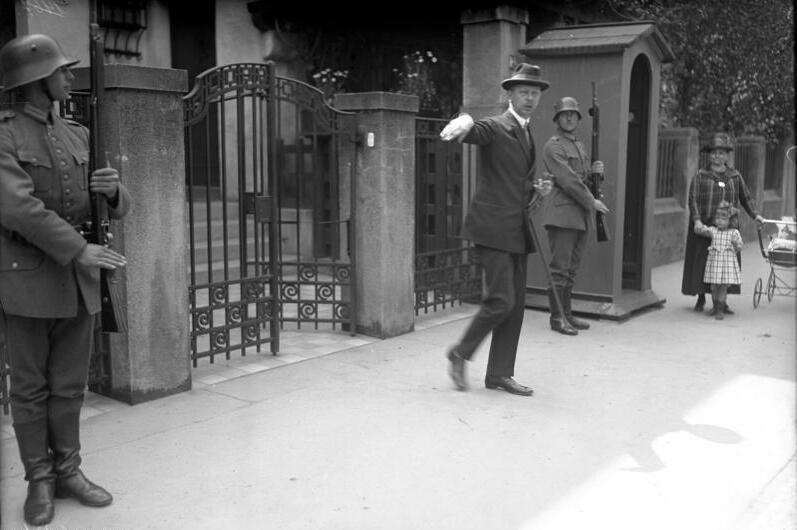
Oskar von Hindenburg in plain clothes fending off photographers, July 1932

Allegations that President Hindenburg appointed Hitler as chancellor because of pressure from Oskar have never been conclusively established. Nevertheless, Franz von Papen, who had served as chancellor until he was supplanted by Schleicher in December 1932, was negotiating behind Hitler's back to become chancellor again of a presidential government, which would rule by decree under Article 48 of the Weimar Constitution. He almost certainly would have succeeded except for the influence of Oskar on his father. Other factors are important, but, in the view of Klaus Fischer, without Oskar and State Secretary Meissner's behind-the-scenes influence, Papen would have had a much tougher time convincing President Hindenburg to invite "that Bohemian corporal" and the Nazi Party to form a government at all.

The journalist William Shirer, in his 1960 book The Rise and Fall of the Third Reich, stated that Oskar von Hindenburg was promoted to major general after the plebiscite unifying the offices of President and Reich Chancellor and that he remained a loyal Nazi. He faded from the history of the Third Reich after the plebiscite, but Shirer argued that the final act in Hitler's consolidation of power was vital, and without Oskar von Hindenburg's earlier influence with his father on behalf of Hitler's bid to be invited to form a government after the fall of Chancellor von Schleicher on 28 January 1933, Hitler might not have ascended to power at all.

The other obvious influence in Hitler's favour was the likelihood of a coalition government with the conservative German National People's Party (DNVP). That almost fell apart at the last minute as well, since the coalition partners were so intent on arguing over prospective cabinet appointments (the Nazis were ultimately outnumbered in the Cabinet 8–3) that they left President Hindenburg waiting well past the appointed time for the meeting at which Hitler was named chancellor. The president almost cancelled the meeting in exasperation. Hitler's being named chancellor was not certain until it was announced, and it was Oskar von Hindenburg and his work with his father that, in Shirer's view, tipped the balance in Hitler's favour. Shirer also claimed that Oskar received 5,000 additional acres to his estates at Neudeck in addition to rapid advancement in the German Armed Forces.

According to Günther von Tschirschky und Bögendorff, an interwar German diplomat and associate of the elder Hindenburg who later defected to the United Kingdom, President Paul von Hindenburg's last will and testament had criticised the Nazis and supported democracy. Oskar von Hindenburg, as a Nazi supporter, was alleged to have handed this document over on Hitler's request. The defector said in 1947 that “Hitler would never have come into power, and there would have been no war, if the wishes of Hindenburg had been known to the German people.”

By contrast, Wolfram Pyta argues that Oskar's influence on his father has been overemphasised, that the selection of Hitler as chancellor was not a matter on which the President would have allowed himself to be led by his son, and that there is no evidence that Oskar played any role in Hitler's appointment.

== Bibliography ==
- Klaus Fischer. Nazi Germany: A New History. New York: Continuum, 1995.
- O.C. Hiss, Hindenburg: Eine Kleine Streitschrift, Potsdam: Sans Souci Press, 1931.
- Wolfram Pyta, Hindenburg, Herrschaft zwischen Hohenzollern und Hitler, Munich: Siedler, 2007, ISBN 978-3-88680-865-6.
- William Shirer, The Rise and Fall of the Third Reich.
- Snyder, Louis Leo The Encyclopedia of the Third Reich, New York: McGraw-Hill, 1976.
- Henry Ashby Turner Hitler's Thirty Days to Power: January 1933, Reading, Massachusetts: Addison-Wesley, 1996.
