= Bezledy =

- Village
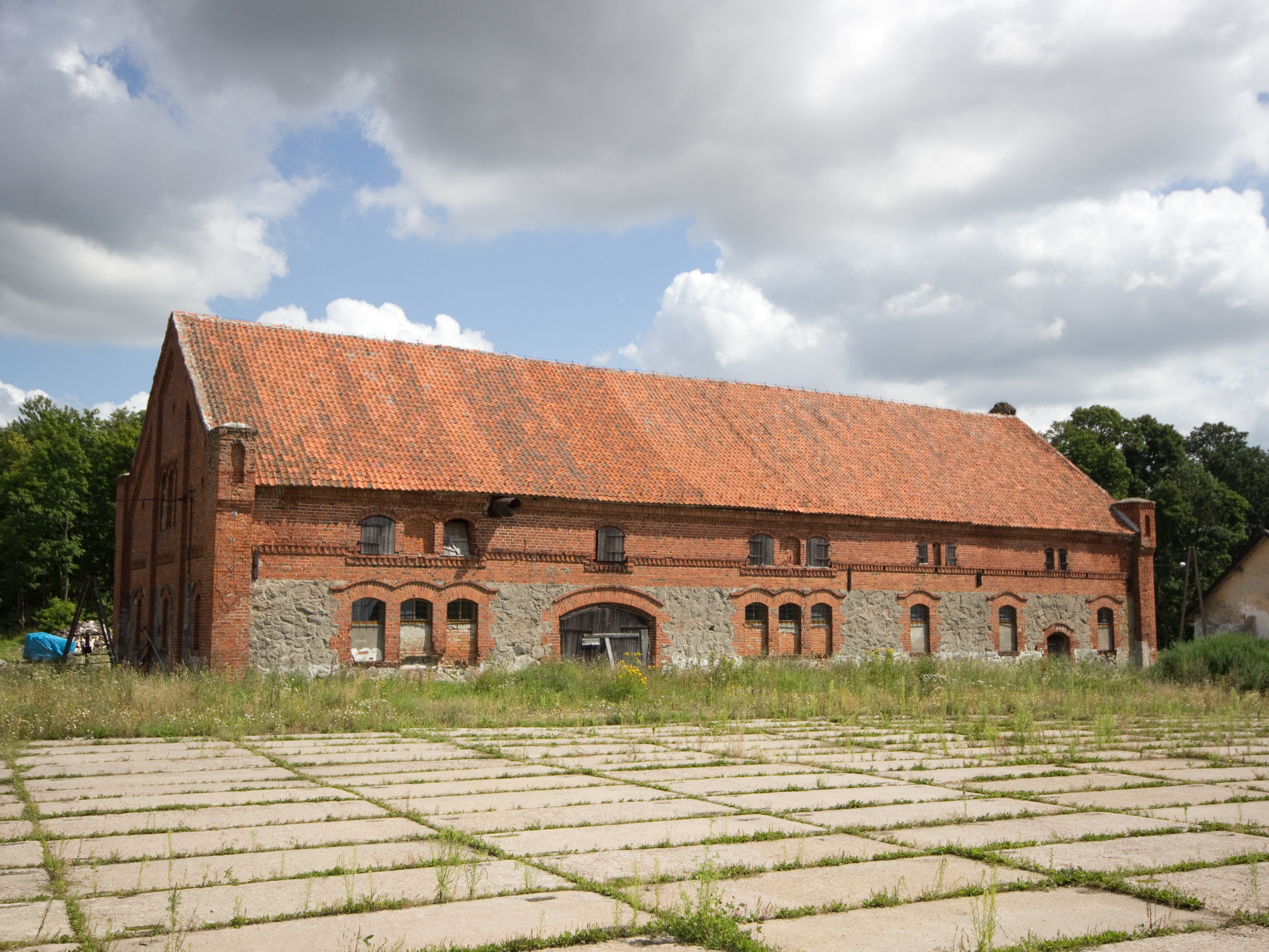
- Old farm building

- Location within Poland
- Coordinates: 54°19′21″N 20°43′41″E
- Country: Poland
- Voivodeship: Warmian-Masurian
- County: Bartoszyce
- Gmina: Bartoszyce

Population
  - Total: 470
- Time zone: UTC+1 (CET)
  - Summer (DST): UTC+2 (CEST)
- Vehicle registration: NBA

Bezledy [bɛˈzlɛdɨ] (German: Beisleiden) is a village in the administrative district of Gmina Bartoszyce, within Bartoszyce County, Warmian-Masurian Voivodeship, in northern Poland, close to the border with the Kaliningrad Oblast of Russia.

The village is the main border crossing point between Russia and Poland (Bezledy/Bagrationovsk).

== History ==
An Old Prussian castle named Beselede, property of the Natangian nobleman Posdraupote, was first mentioned in a chronicle of the Teutonic Order in 1274, when the castle had been besieged by Sudovians. The village was mentioned as an Old Prussian settlement in 1338 and in 1400 as the property of Philipp von Beisleiden with a size of 20 "Hufen", a square measure of the Teutonic Knights. Throughout the Polish-Teutonic Hunger War of 1414 the settlement was destroyed by Polish troops, who killed 3 men and caused a damage of 300 Mark. In 1440, Philipp von Beisleiden, owner of the village, joined the Prussian Confederation, opposing the rule of the Teutonic Knights. In 1454, King Casimir IV Jagiellon incorporated the region to the Kingdom of Poland upon the request of the Prussian Confederation. After the subsequent Thirteen Years' War (1454–1466), the village became a part of Poland as a fief held by Teutonic Order. In 1484 the von Prömock family, a noble family of Old Prussian origin, was mentioned as owner of the village, which lasted until 1671.

From the 18th century, the village formed part of the Kingdom of Prussia, and from 1871 it was also part of Germany, within which it was administratively located in the province of East Prussia. After a time of constantly changing landlords the village was bought by Ludwig von Oldenburg in 1801, whose family owned the manor until 1945. The manor house was completely destroyed in 1945.

From 1945 to 1958 the village was administratively located in the Iławka County in the Masurian District and Olsztyn Voivodeship. From 1959 to 1961 it was administratively located in the Górowo County in the Olsztyn Voivodeship.

== Notable residents ==
- Elard von Oldenburg-Januschau (1855–1937), politician
