= Ogrodzieniec, Warmian-Masurian Voivodeship =

Ogrodzieniec
- Village
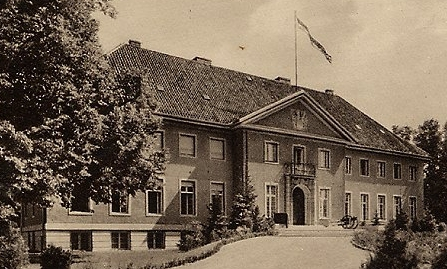
- Neudeck manor house in 1928

- Location within Poland
- Coordinates: 53°36′N 19°19′E
- Country: Poland
- Voivodeship: Warmian-Masurian
- County: Iława
- Gmina: Kisielice
- Time zone: UTC+1 (CET)
  - Summer (DST): UTC+2 (CEST)
- Vehicle registration: NIL

Ogrodzieniec [ɔɡrɔˈd͡ʑɛɲɛt͡s] (German: Neudeck) is a village in the administrative district of Gmina Kisielice, within Iława County, Warmian-Masurian Voivodeship, in northern Poland. It is located in the region of Powiśle.

It was the country residence of German President Paul von Hindenburg, who died there in 1934.

== History ==
The German name of the village, Neudeck, is probably derived from Old Prussian Najdekai. The area settled by Pomesanian tribes was conquered by the Teutonic Knights from 1234 onwards. Neudeck was founded about 1320 by a Teutonic lokator; it was devastated in the Polish–Teutonic Hunger War of 1414. In 1454, upon the request of the anti-Teutonic Prussian Confederation, the region was incorporated into the Kingdom of Poland by King Casimir IV Jagiellon. The village was devastated again during the subsequent Thirteen Years' War (1454–66) (the longest of all Polish–Teutonic wars). After the Second Peace of Thorn (1466), it became part of Poland as a fief held by the Order's State. It was part of the Duchy of Prussia, a vassal duchy of Poland, from 1525. A 1543 deed mentions only two extant farmsteads.

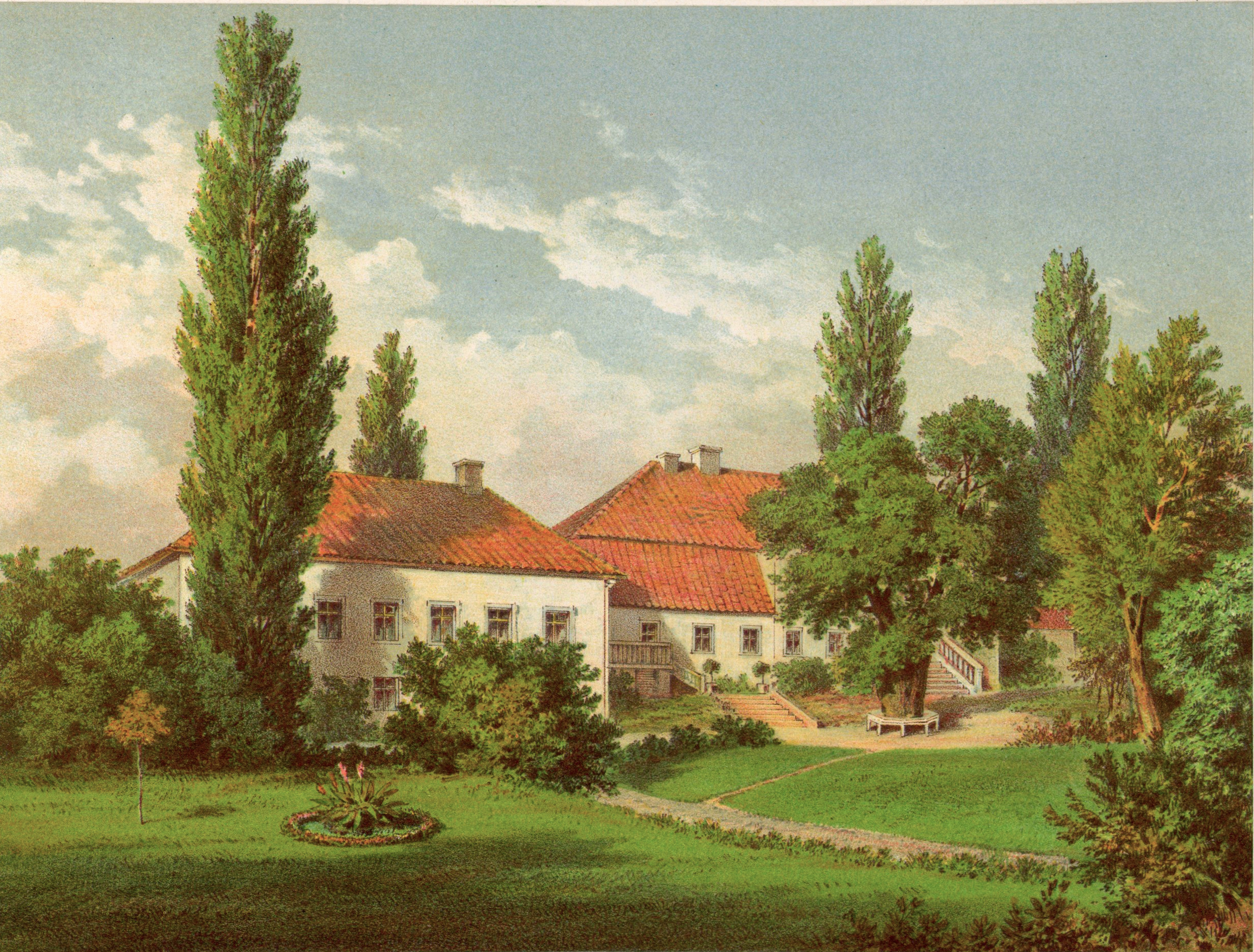
Neudeck manor in 1860, lithograph by Alexander Duncker

In the 18th century the village became part of the Kingdom of Prussia. The local manor became the ancestral country estate of the Hindenburg noble family, originally descending from Farther Pomerania, when it was purchased by the Prussian colonel Otto Friedrich von Hindenburg in 1755. After his death, it was inherited by his nephew Otto Gottfried von Beneckendorff (1747–1827), Lord of Keimkallen near Heiligenbeil, who from 1789 continued the name von Beneckendorff und von Hindenburg with the consent from King Frederick William II of Prussia. The village was incorporated into the Province of West Prussia from 1773 until 1922 when, under the border readjustment following World War I and the Treaty of Versailles, the German remnants of West Prussia were absorbed by East Prussia.

Paul von Beneckendorff und von Hindenburg, great-grandson of Otto Gottfried, spent the summers at Neudeck as a child. His parents family moved into the manor house in 1863. In 1926 the estate, held by Paul's cousin Lina, had gone into debt and was in need of major investment. On the occasion of Hindenburg's 80th birthday on 2 October 1927, the German government and contributions from German industrialists on initiative of Elard von Oldenburg-Januschau gave the hero of Tannenberg and current Reich President clear title to Neudeck. Hindenburg had the manor house rebuilt and titled the deed to Neudeck in the name of his son, Oskar von Hindenburg. According to his political enemies, this was ostensibly done to avoid payment of inheritance taxes. Hindenburg and his descendants were officially exempt from taxes by law enacted by Hitler's government in 1933. After the president's death on 2 August 1934, his mortal remains were solemnly transferred from Neudeck to the Tannenberg Memorial.

Oskar von Hindenburg and his wife lived at Neudeck until the end of World War II, when they fled to Medingen in present-day Lower Saxony during the Evacuation of East Prussia in January 1945, shortly before their house was looted by Red Army soldiers and set on fire. Neudeck became part of the People's Republic of Poland according to the Potsdam Agreement of the same year. The rest of the German population who were not evacuated or fled, were expelled to Germany also in accordance to the Potsdam Agreement. The ruins of the manor house were demolished in 1950.
