= Eastern Aid =

Weimar Republic economic program and scandal

Eastern Aid (German: Osthilfe) was a program of the government of the Weimar Republic beginning in 1926 to give financial support to agriculture in Germany's easternmost regions, primarily the eastern provinces of Prussia. The intention was that the agricultural estates there, which were suffering financially for a number of reasons, would be able to restructure and reduce their heavy debt loads. The political power of the large estate owners (Junkers) led to them reaping the greatest benefits from the program.

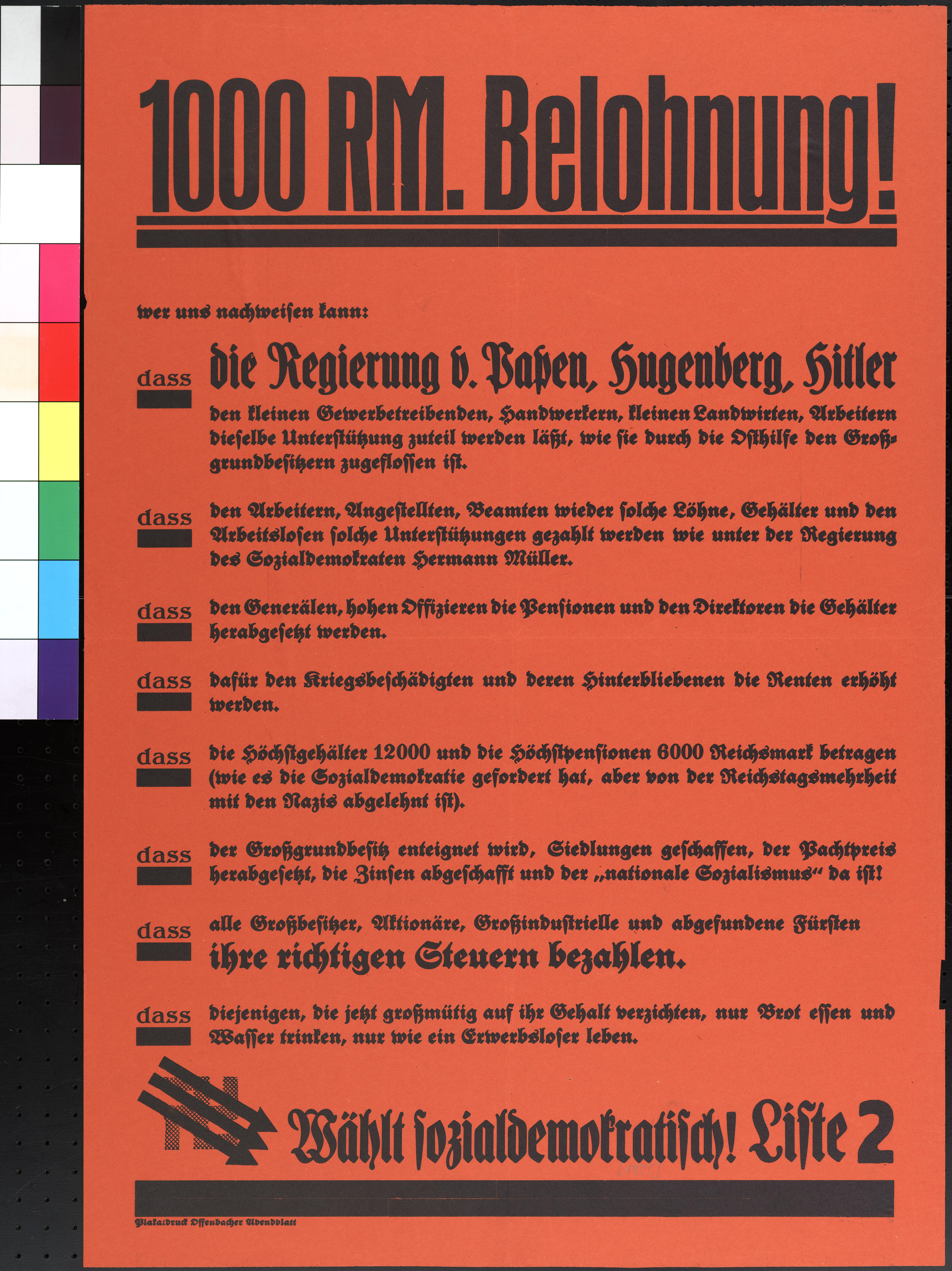
SPD poster for the 1933 German election attacking the Osthilfe program

This policy produced a major scandal in Germany in December 1932 and January 1933, the Osthilfeskandal. A considerable number of Junkers were found out to have wasted the money on what were considered to be luxury items, such as cars and vacations. The ensuing investigations into the scandal also implicated the President of the Republic, General Paul von Hindenburg. It came to light that the Hindenburg family's highly indebted estate in East Prussia at Neudeck (owned by the president's brother) had been clandestinely bought in 1927 by a number of industrialists and given to the president as a gift, seemingly in exchange for political influence, and that the property had been registered in Hindenburg's son's name, apparently to evade estate taxes. The recipients of the aid, including some of Hindenburg's close friends, were upset by the government's failure to cover up the scandal, as was Hindenburg himself, so that Chancellor Kurt von Schleicher lost influence on Hindenburg as a result.

After the donation of a further 5,000 acres (20 km^{2}) to this property, and after the Nazis came to power, the matter ceased to command attention in the censored press of the Third Reich.
