= Johannes Schmidt (SS-member) =

German SS member, murderer of Kurt von Schleicher (1908-1976)

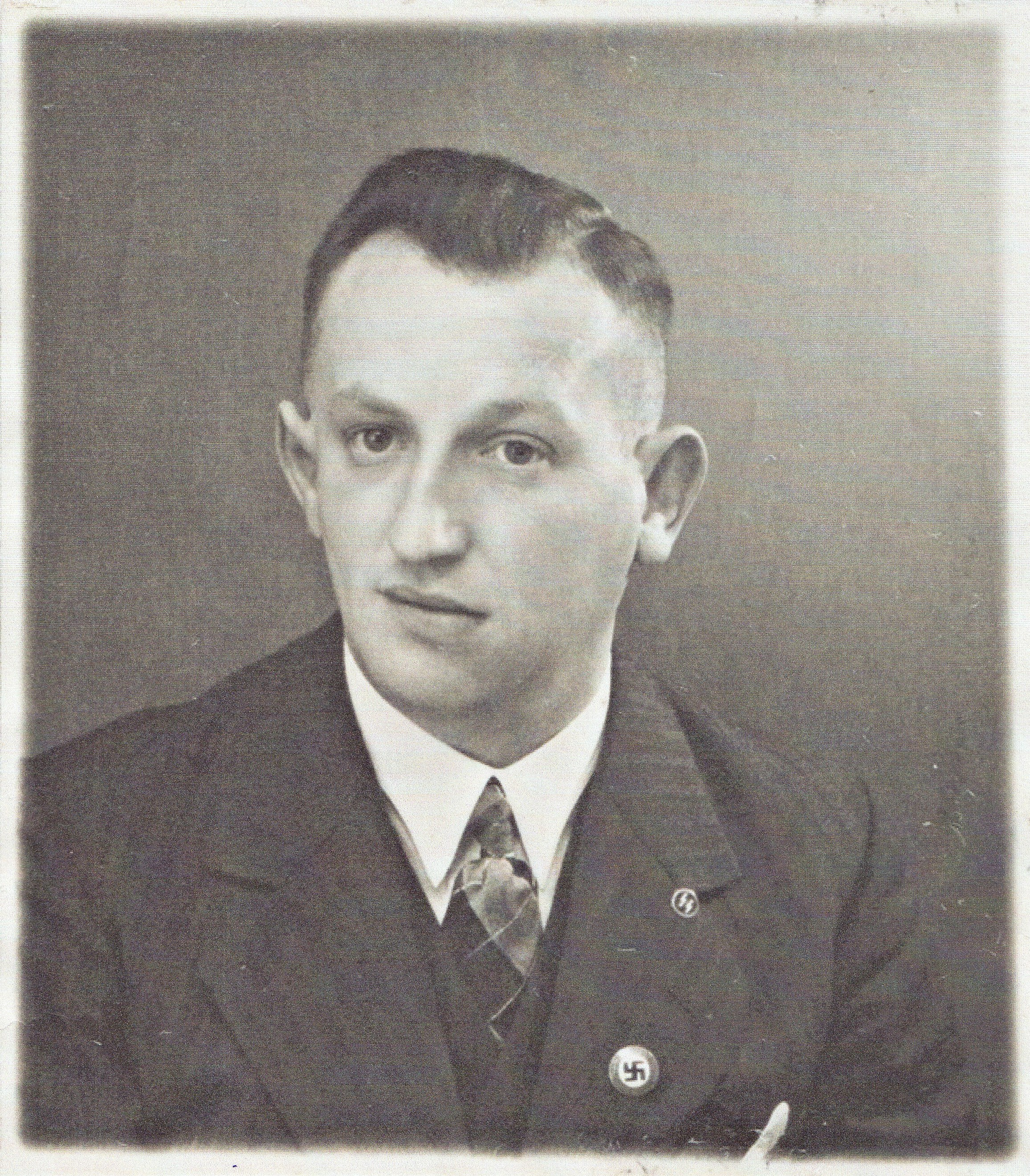
Johannes Schmidt

Johannes Schmidt (11 March 1908 in Gotha – 23 December 1976 in Offenbach am Main) was a member of the Sicherheitsdienst (SD), the intelligence agency of the Schutzstaffel (SS).

== Early life ==
Schmidt was the son of coal merchant Johannes Schmidt and his wife Olga. Through his mother, he was a grandson of organ builder Wilhelm Heerwagen. Schmidt had a younger brother, Herbert Heinrich Ernst Schmidt (born 1915), who went missing in World War II.

Schmidt suffered a physical injury at birth; his right ear was replaced with an artificial one.

== Education ==
He attended the Arnoldi School in Gotha, where he passed his Abitur (university entrance examination) in 1927. He then studied law at the University of Jena (1927/28) and at the University of Heidelberg (1928/29), and again in Jena. There, he received his doctorate in law (Dr. jur.) in 1933 under Hellmuth von Weber for his dissertation on the concept of violence. After passing the bar exam in 1931, he entered the legal traineeship and worked at various courts. He passed the second state examination in 1935.

== Nazi party ==
As a teenager, Schmidt was a member of the far-right German National Youth League. In 1923, he disrupted a commemoration of the founding of the Weimar Republic on November 9, 1918, at his school. In Heidelberg, he belonged to a student fraternity.

In the summer of 1929, he joined the National Socialist German Students' League where he became Gau student leader in Thuringia, and on December 1, 1929, he joined the Nazi Party (membership number 178,151). He was not publicly active in the Nazi Party.

As a law student, Schmidt could not afford to openly profess his allegiance to the party without jeopardizing his studies and his desired government employment.

From 1931, he built up an intelligence service in the territory of SS-Standarte XIV. On June 30, 1933, Schmidt joined the SS (SS number 36,232) and became an SS-Sturmführer in 1933, an SS-Obersturmführer in 1934, an SS-Hauptsturmführer in 1937, and an SS-Sturmbannführer in 1939.

=== Work for the security service ===
In 1933, Schmidt was assigned to the Security Service of the Reichsführer-SS. He began his training in Munich and lived there until 1934.

Afterwards, he and his friend Hermann Behrends were transferred to Berlin, where he took over a department of the SD Upper Section East, which was headed by Behrends.

From February to August 1934, Schmidt was head of Abteilung I (Information). In both Munich and Berlin, Schmidt lived in the SD building. At that time, the SD had a strength of approximately 200 men throughout the Reich. The group in the SD Upper Section East responsible for Berlin, which was based in the villa on Eichenallee, consisted of about 30 people.

In 1934, Himmler took over the Secret State Police; Behrends and Schmidt assumed positions there. Schmidt was assigned to Main Department III (Espionage and Counter-Espionage) as head of the Economic Espionage Sub-Department.

== Murder of Schleicher ==
On 30 June 1934, Schmidt shot Hitler's predecessor as Reichschancellor, Kurt von Schleicher on behalf of Reinhard Heydrich, during the political purge of the Nazi Government known as the Night of the Long Knives.

The murders of Schleicher and his wife on June 30, 1934, were carried out by SD officers in civilian clothes. Historians and scholars considered it possible that Schmidt had murdered Schleicher. This assessment was based, among other things, on the contents of Heinrich Orb's (Heinrich Pfeifer) book: National Socialism: 13 Years of Power Frenzy, 1945 (Die 13 Jahre des Rausch und der Macht).

In his 1945 book, Pfeifer/Orb identified Schmidt as Schleicher's murderer. This theory could never be proven, as those suspected of murder were able to cover their tracks after the killings. Hitler assigned Behrends a secret office in the Prussian House of Representatives, from which he was able to carry out his cover-up activities for the murders. Orth, incidentally, considers the murder to be more likely an accidental killing, as the perpetrators were allegedly overwhelmed.

According to accounts, five of the following men from SD Section East and SD Section III were considered to have accompanied Schmidt during the murder: SS-Obertruppführer Kurt Brunow, SS-Obersturmführer Werner Göttsch, SS-Untersturmführer Kurt Graaf, SS-Untersturmführer Richard Gutkaes, SS-Oberscharführer Alfred Naujocks, SS-Mann Josef Pospischil, SS-Obersturmführer Richard Pruchtnow and the following members of SD Section III: SS-Obersturmführer Willy Falkenberg, SS-Untersturmführer Heinz Schildt, V-Mann Ernst Werner, and SS-Obersturmbannführer Walter Sohst.

== Work ==
In the autumn of 1934, Schmidt came to Thuringia, where he initially held the post of a judge in Gotha. From 1936, he became head of the office of State Secretary Walter Ortlepp in the Thuringian Ministry of the Interior.

In April 1938, he became an advisor for the political police in the local police department, which he soon took over as head. Schmidt ultimately held the rank of senior government official.

== Arrest ==
On 28 April 1945, Schmidt was arrested by U.S. military occupation authorities. He spent three years in internment camps, and was released from custody in 1948. Schmidt was questioned, but never charged, over the killing of Schleicher.

== Personal life ==
Schmidt married Gerda Küttner in 1937; they had five children. After his first marriage ended in divorce, he married Elli Oetzel in an internment camp in 1948; they had one daughter.

== In the media ==
- Rainer Orth: Der SD-Mann Johannes Schmidt. Der Mörder des Reichskanzlers Kurt von Schleicher? Tectum, Marburg 2012, ISBN 978-3-8288-2872-8. (Magisterarbeit Humboldt-Universität Berlin).

== Sources ==
- Dederichs, M. (2009) Heydrich. The Face of Evil.
