= Januszewo, Iława County =

Januszewo
- Village
- Location within Poland
- Coordinates: 53°43′N 19°29′E
- Country: Poland
- Voivodeship: Warmian-Masurian
- County: Iława
- Gmina: Susz
- Population: 300
- Time zone: UTC+1 (CET)
  - Summer (DST): UTC+2 (CEST)

Januszewo ([januˈʂɛvɔ]; German: Januschau) is a village in the administrative district of Gmina Susz, within Iława County, Warmian-Masurian Voivodeship, in northern Poland.

== Notable residents ==
- Elard von Oldenburg-Januschau (1855–1937), German politician.
