= Sans Souci Press =

Sans Souci Press began as a reactionary underground printing house in Potsdam, Germany, in the late nineteenth century. Named for the Sanssouci Palace, the press produced pamphlets decrying the supposed liberalism of Wilhelm II's reign, and particularly his ties to the English.

The Press is not to be confused with the later Wellesley Hills, Massachusetts firm of the same name.

== Authors ==
Its inventory was relatively obscure, limited as it was to those who knew of the press's existence and who met its rather stringent ideological qualifications for publishing. It published works by such little-known authors as soldier and politician Karl Groener, historian and sociologist Otto C. Hiss, and general Karl von Bülow. Von Bülow's anonymous pamphlet criticizing the Schlieffen Plan to invade France caused a minor stir when it garnered the attention of Kaiser Wilhelm II's inner circle. There is little evidence that it was much noticed or influential elsewhere. Several small booklets of the poetry of Ernst Moritz Arndt, dating from the early 1890s, have surfaced in recent years. Contemporary sources link the press to bawdy songs about Albert I, King of the Belgians; none of these has come to light.

For many years it relied on reprints of 18th-century polemical pamphlets produced during the reign of Frederick the Great, whose relationship to contemporary political questions was not always immediately clear. This continued through World War One.

== Decline ==
By the time of World War I, the press had devolved into a vanity press that continued to operate, off and on, until Otto Dietrich, Hitler's Reich Chief of the Press, shut it down in 1937. Despite the political conservatism of the press, its backers—by then in their second generation—were to the end loyal if occasionally critical supporters of the Hohenzollern monarchy and could not abide the rise of the low-born Adolf Hitler. The press's location was discovered when correspondence between Hiss and the deposed Kaiser Wilhelm was intercepted by German officials, monitoring all mail destined for the Kaiser's place of exile in Doorn, the Netherlands. Hiss, for his part, escaped to the Netherlands and ultimately England; the identities of others directly involved in the press remain a mystery.

== Sources ==
- Barbara Tuchman, The Guns of August, New York, 1972
- O.C. Hiss, Kleine Geschichte der geheimen Presse, Vanitas Presse: Berlin, 1946
- General Erich Ludendorff, My War Memoirs, 1914-1918. 2v. ("Meine Kriegserinnerungen 1914-1918", written in Sweden, 1919).
- John Lee, The Warlords: Hindenburg And Ludendorff (Great Commanders S.)
