= Kurt von Schleicher =

Chancellor of Germany from 1932 to 1933

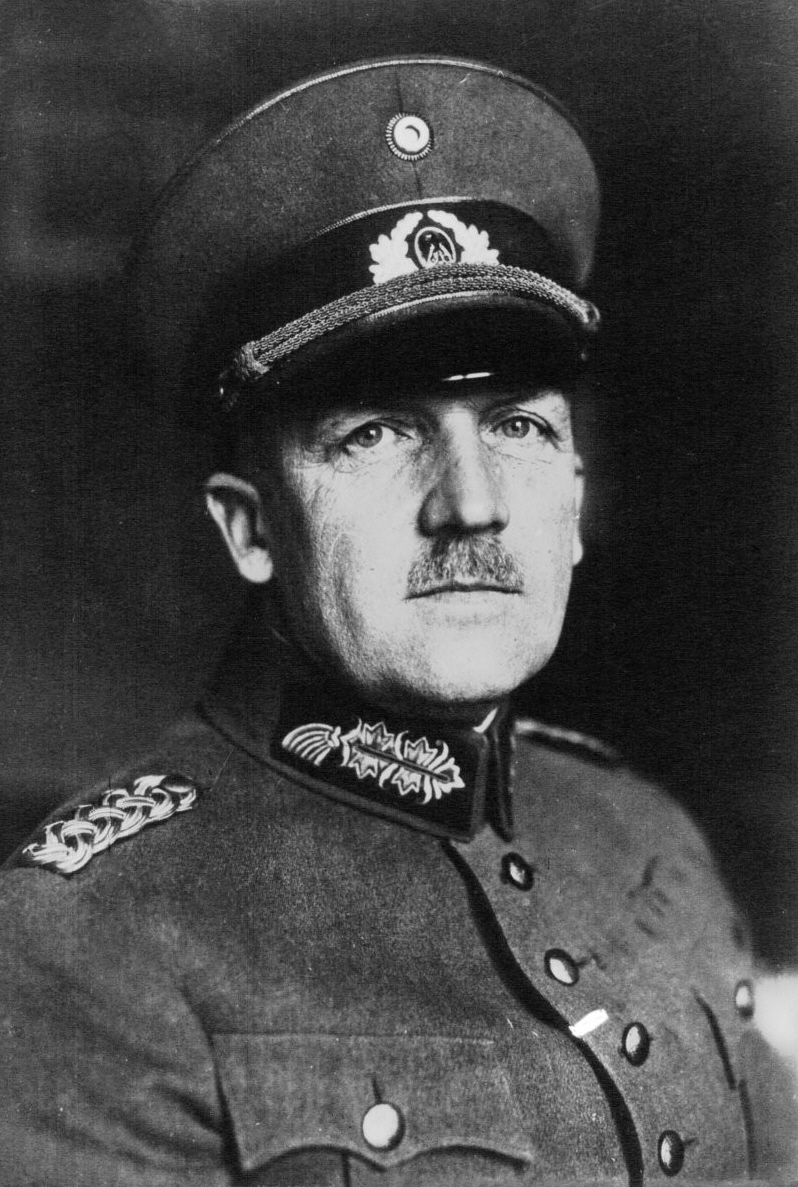
- Schleicher in 1932

Chancellor of Germany Weimar Republic
- In office 3 December 1932 – 30 January 1933
- President: Paul von Hindenburg
- Preceded by: Franz von Papen
- Succeeded by: Adolf Hitler

Reichskommissar of Prussia
- In office 3 December 1932 – 30 January 1933
- Preceded by: Franz von Papen
- Succeeded by: Franz von Papen

Minister of defense
- In office 1 June 1932 – 30 January 1933
- Chancellor: Franz von Papen; Himself
- Preceded by: Wilhelm Groener
- Succeeded by: Werner von Blomberg

Personal details
- Born: Kurt Ferdinand Friedrich Hermann von Schleicher; 7 April 1882 Brandenburg an der Havel, Brandenburg Province, Kingdom of Prussia, German Empire
- Died: 30 June 1934 (aged 52) Potsdam-Babelsberg, Nazi Germany
- Cause of death: Assassination by gunshot
- Resting place: Parkfriedhof Lichterfelde, Berlin, Germany
- Spouse: Elisabeth von Schleicher (m. 1931)
- Education: Prussian Military Academy

Military service
- Allegiance: German Empire; Weimar Republic
- Branch/service: Imperial German Army; Reichsheer
- Years of service: 1900–1932
- Rank: General der Infanterie
- Battles/wars: World War I; Eastern Front; Kerensky Offensive

Kurt Ferdinand Friedrich Hermann von Schleicher (German: [ˈkʊʁt fɔn ˈʃlaɪçɐ]; 7 April 1882 – 30 June 1934) was a German military officer and the penultimate chancellor of Germany during the Weimar Republic. A rival for power with Adolf Hitler, Schleicher was assassinated by Hitler's Schutzstaffel (SS) during the Night of the Long Knives in 1934.

Schleicher was born into a military family in Brandenburg an der Havel. Entering the Prussian Army as a lieutenant in 1900, he rose to become a general staff officer in the Railway Department of the German General Staff and served in the General Staff of the Supreme Army Command during World War I. Schleicher served as liaison between the army and the new Weimar Republic during the German Revolution of 1918–1919. An important player in the Reichswehr's efforts to avoid the restrictions of the Treaty of Versailles, Schleicher rose to power as head of the Reichswehr's Armed Forces Department and was a close advisor to President Paul von Hindenburg from 1926 onward. Following the appointment of his mentor Wilhelm Groener as minister of defence in 1928, Schleicher became head of the defense Ministry's Office of Ministerial Affairs (Ministeramt) in 1929. In 1930, he was instrumental in the toppling of Hermann Müller's government and the appointment of Heinrich Brüning as chancellor. He enlisted the services of the Nazi Party's Sturmabteilung (SA) as an auxiliary force for the Reichswehr from 1931 onward.

Beginning in 1932, Schleicher served as minister of defence in the cabinet of Franz von Papen. Schleicher organised the downfall of Papen and succeeded him as Chancellor on 3 December. During his brief term, Schleicher negotiated with Gregor Strasser on a possible defection of the latter from the Nazi Party, but the plan was abandoned. Schleicher attempted to "tame" Hitler into cooperating with his government by threatening him with an anti-Nazi alliance of parties, the so-called Querfront ("cross-front"). Hitler refused to abandon his claim to the chancellorship and Schleicher's plan failed. Schleicher then proposed to Hindenburg that the latter disperse the Reichstag and rule as a de facto dictator, a course of action Hindenburg rejected.

On 28 January 1933, facing a political impasse and deteriorating health, Schleicher resigned and recommended the appointment of Hitler in his stead. Schleicher sought to return to politics by exploiting the divisions between Ernst Röhm and Hitler, but on 30 June 1934, he and his wife Elisabeth were murdered on the orders of Hitler during the Night of the Long Knives.

== Early life and family ==
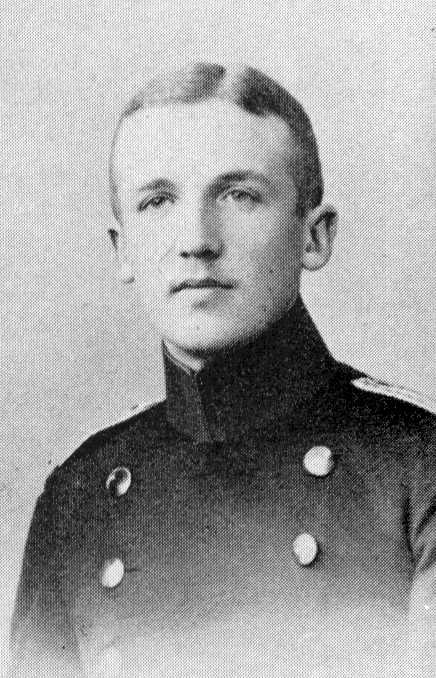
Leutnant von Schleicher in 1900

Kurt Ferdinand Friedrich Hermann von Schleicher was born on 7 April 1882, in Brandenburg an der Havel, the son of Prussian officer and noble Hermann Friedrich Ferdinand von Schleicher (1853–1906) and a wealthy East Prussian shipowner's daughter, Magdalena Heyn (1857–1939). He had an older sister, Thusnelda Luise Amalie Magdalene (1879–1955), and a younger brother, Ludwig-Ferdinand Friedrich (1884–1923). On 28 July 1931, Schleicher married Elisabeth von Schleicher, daughter of the Prussian general Victor von Hennigs. She had previously been married to Schleicher's cousin, Bogislav von Schleicher, whom she had divorced on 4 May 1931.

He studied at the Hauptkadettenanstalt in Lichterfelde from 1896 to 1900. He was promoted to Leutnant on 22 March 1900 and was assigned to the 3rd Foot Guards, where he befriended fellow junior officers Oskar von Hindenburg, Kurt von Hammerstein-Equord and Erich von Manstein. From 1 November 1906 to 31 October 1909, he served as adjutant of the Fusilier battalion of his regiment.

After his promotion to Oberleutnant on 18 October 1909, he was assigned to the Prussian Military Academy, where he met Franz von Papen. Upon graduation on 24 September 1913, he was assigned to the German General Staff where he joined the Railway Department at his own request. He soon became a protégé of his immediate superior, Lieutenant Colonel Wilhelm Groener. Schleicher was promoted to captain on 18 December 1913.

== First World War ==
After the outbreak of World War I, Schleicher was assigned to the General Staff at the Supreme Army Command. During the Battle of Verdun, he wrote a manuscript criticising war profiteering in certain industrial sectors, causing a sensation and earning him the approval of the Social Democratic Party of Germany (SPD) chairman Friedrich Ebert and a reputation as a liberal. From November 1916 to May 1917, Schleicher served in the Kriegsamt (War Office), an agency tasked with administering the war economy led by Groener.

Schleicher's only front-line mission was as Chief of Staff of the 237th Division on the Eastern Front from 23 May 1917 to mid-August 1917 during the Kerensky Offensive. He served the rest of the war at the Supreme Army Command. He was promoted to Major on 15 July 1918. Following the collapse of the German war effort from August 1918 onward, Schleicher's patron Groener was appointed Erster Generalquartiermeister and assumed de facto command of the German Army on 29 October 1918. As Groener's trusted assistant, Schleicher became a crucial liaison between the civil and military authorities.

== Army service after the First World War ==
=== German Revolution ===
After the November Revolution of 1918, the situation of the German military was precarious. In December 1918, Schleicher delivered an ultimatum to Friedrich Ebert on behalf of Paul von Hindenburg demanding that the German provisional government either allow the Army to crush the Spartacus League or the Army would do that task itself.

During the ensuing talks with the German cabinet, Schleicher was able to get permission to allow the Army to return to Berlin. On 23 December 1918, the provisional government under Ebert came under attack from the radical left-wing Volksmarinedivision. Schleicher played a key role in negotiating the Ebert–Groener pact. In exchange for agreeing to send help to the government, Schleicher was able to secure Ebert's assent to the Army being allowed to maintain its political autonomy as a "state within the state".

To crush the left-wing rebels, Schleicher helped to found the Freikorps in early January 1919. Schleicher's role for the rest of the Weimar Republic was to serve as the Reichswehr's political fixer, who would ensure that the military's interests would be secured.

=== 1920s ===
==== Contacts with the Soviet Union ====
In the early 1920s, Schleicher emerged as a leading protégé of General Hans von Seeckt, who often gave Schleicher sensitive assignments. In the spring of 1921, Seeckt created a secret group within the Reichswehr known as Sondergruppe R, whose task was to work with the Red Army in their common struggle against the international system established by the Treaty of Versailles. Schleicher worked out the arrangements with Leonid Krasin for German aid to the Soviet arms industry. German financial and technological aid in building the industry was exchanged for Soviet support in helping Germany circumvent the disarmament clauses of the Treaty of Versailles. Schleicher created several dummy corporations, most notably the GEFU (Gesellschaft zur Förderung gewerblicher Unternehmungen, "Company for the Promotion of Industrial Enterprise"), which funnelled 75 million Reichsmarks, some $18 million (equivalent to $340 million in 2025), into the Soviet arms industry by the end of 1923.

==== Black Reichswehr ====
At the same time, a team led by Fedor von Bock and comprising Schleicher, Eugen Ott and Kurt von Hammerstein-Equord established what came to be known as the Black Reichswehr. Major Bruno Ernst Buchrucker was tasked with building up the Arbeitskommandos (Work Commandos), officially a labor group intended to assist with civilian projects but in reality a force of soldiers. This fiction allowed Germany to exceed the limits on troop strength set by the Versailles Treaty. The Black Reichswehr became infamous for its practice of using Feme murders to punish "traitors" who, for example, revealed the locations of weapons' stockpiles or names of members. During the trials of some of those charged with the murders, prosecutors alleged that the killings were ordered by the officers from Bock's group.

Schleicher denied in court that the Reichswehr ministry had had any knowledge of the "Black Reichswehr" or the murders they had committed. In a secret letter sent to the president of the German Supreme Court, which was trying a member of the Black Reichswehr for murder, Seeckt admitted that the Black Reichswehr was controlled by the Reichswehr, and claimed that the murders were justified by the struggle against Versailles; the court should therefore acquit the defendant. Although Seeckt disliked Schleicher, he appreciated his political finesse and came increasingly to assign Schleicher tasks dealing with politicians.

==== Military-political role in the Weimar Republic ====
Despite Hans von Seeckt's patronage, it was Schleicher who brought about the former's downfall in 1926 by leaking the fact that Seeckt had invited Prince Wilhelm of Prussia, the former Crown Prince's eldest son, to attend military manoeuvres. After Seeckt's fall Schleicher became, in the words of Andreas Hillgruber, "in fact, if not in name [the] military-political head of the Reichswehr". Schleicher's triumph was also the triumph of the "modern" faction within the Reichswehr, which favored a total war ideology and wanted Germany to become a dictatorship that would wage total war upon the other nations of Europe.

During the 1920s, Schleicher moved up steadily in the Reichswehr, becoming the primary liaison between the army and civilian government officials. He was promoted to Lieutenant Colonel on 1 January 1924, and Colonel in 1926. On 29 January 1929, he became Generalmajor. Schleicher generally preferred to operate behind the scenes, planting stories in friendly newspapers and relying on a casual network of informers to find out what other government departments were planning. Following the hyperinflation of 1923, the Reichswehr took over much of the administration of the country between September 1923 and February 1924, a task in which Schleicher played a prominent role.

The appointment of Groener as defence minister in January 1928 did much to advance Schleicher's career. Groener, who regarded Schleicher as his "adopted son", created the Ministeramt (Office of the Ministerial Affairs) for Schleicher in 1928. The new office officially dealt with all matters relating to joint concerns of the Army and Navy, and was tasked with liaising between the military and other departments, and between the military and politicians. Because Schleicher interpreted that mandate very broadly, the Ministeramt quickly became the means by which the Reichswehr interfered in politics. The creation of the Ministeramt formalised Schleicher's position as the chief political fixer for the Reichswehr, a role which had existed informally since 1918. He became Chef des Ministeramtes on 1 February 1929.

Like his patron Groener, Schleicher was alarmed by the results of the Reichstag election of 1928, in which the Social Democrats (SPD) won the largest share of the vote on a platform of scrapping the building of Panzerkreuzer A, the intended lead ship of the proposed Deutschland class of "pocket battleships" together with the entire "pocket battleship" building programme. Schleicher opposed the prospect of a "grand coalition" headed by the SPD's Hermann Müller, and made it clear that he preferred that the SPD be excluded from power on the grounds that their anti-militarism disqualified them from office. Both Groener and Schleicher had decided in the aftermath of the 1928 elections to put an end to democracy as the Social Democrats could not be trusted with power. Groener depended on Schleicher to get favorable military budgets passed. Schleicher justified Groener's confidence by getting the naval budget for 1928 passed despite the opposition of the Social Democrats. Schleicher prepared Groener's statements to the Cabinet and attended Cabinet meetings on a regular basis. Above all, Schleicher won the right to brief President Hindenburg on both political and military matters.

In 1929, Schleicher came into conflict with Werner von Blomberg, the chief of the Truppenamt (the disguised General Staff). That year, Schleicher had started a policy of "frontier defense" (Grenzschutz), under which the Reichswehr would stockpile arms in secret depots and start training volunteers, in excess of the limits imposed by Versailles, in the eastern parts of Germany facing Poland. Blomberg wished to extend the system to the French border. Schleicher disagreed, wanting to give the French no excuse to delay their 1930 withdrawal from the Rhineland. Blomberg lost the struggle and was demoted from command of the Truppenamt and sent to command a division in East Prussia.

== Presidential government ==
In late 1926 or early 1927, Schleicher told Hindenburg that if it were impossible to form a government headed by the German National People's Party alone, then Hindenburg should "appoint a government in which he had confidence, without consulting the parties or paying attention to their wishes", and with "the order for dissolution ready to hand, give the government every constitutional opportunity to get a majority in Parliament." Together with Hindenburg's son, Major Oskar von Hindenburg, Otto Meißner, and General Wilhelm Groener, Schleicher was a leading member of the Kamarilla that surrounded President von Hindenburg. It was Schleicher who came up with the idea of a presidential government based on the so-called "25/48/53 formula", which referred to the three articles of the Weimar Constitution that could make a presidential government possible:

- Article 25 allowed the president to dissolve the Reichstag;
- Article 48 allowed the president to sign into law emergency bills without the consent of the Reichstag. However, the Reichstag could cancel any law passed by Article 48 by a simple majority within sixty days of its passage;
- Article 53 allowed the president to appoint the chancellor.

Schleicher's idea was to have Hindenburg use his powers under Article 53 to appoint a man of Schleicher's choosing as chancellor, who would rule under the provisions of Article 48. Should the Reichstag threaten to annul any laws so passed, Hindenburg could counter with the threat of dissolution. Hindenburg was unenthusiastic about these plans, but was pressured into going along with them by his son, Meißner, Groener, and Schleicher.

Schleicher was well known for his sense of humor, his lively conversational skills, his sharp wit, and his habit of abandoning his upper class aristocratic accent to speak his German with a salty working class Berlin accent, full of risqué phrases that many found either charming or vulgar.

During the course of the winter of 1929–1930, Schleicher undermined the "Grand Coalition" government of Hermann Müller by means of various intrigues, with the support of Groener and Hindenburg. In January 1930, after receiving Zentrum party leader Heinrich Brüning's assent to heading a presidential government, Schleicher had told Brüning that the "Hindenburg government" was to be "anti-Marxist" and "anti-parliamentarian", and under no conditions were the Social Democrats to be allowed to serve in office, even though the SPD was the largest party in the Reichstag. In March 1930, Müller's government fell, and the first presidential government headed by Brüning came into office. The German historian Eberhard Kolb described the presidential governments that began in March 1930 as a sort of 'creeping' coup d'état, by which the government gradually became more and more authoritarian and less and less democratic, a process that culminated with the Nazi regime in 1933. The British historian Edgar Feuchtwanger called the Brüning government Schleicher's "brainchild".

=== Social function of the Army ===
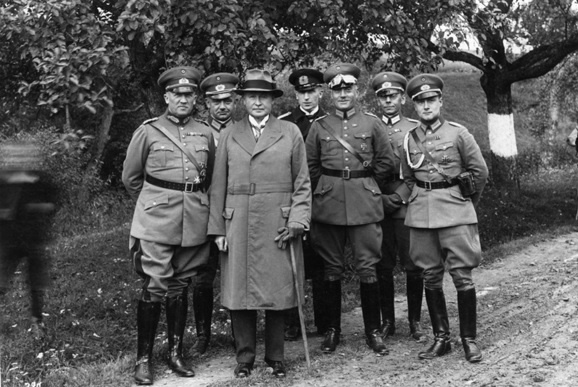
Schleicher (left) with Groener and other officers in 1930

Although essentially a Prussian authoritarian, Schleicher also believed that the Army had a social function as an institution unifying the diverse elements in society. He was also opposed to policies such as Eastern Aid (Osthilfe) for the bankrupt East Elbian estates of his fellow Junkers.

To bypass Part V of the Treaty of Versailles, which had forbidden conscription, Schleicher engaged the services of the SA and other paramilitaries as the best substitute for conscription. From December 1930 onwards, Schleicher was in regular secret contact with Ernst Röhm, the leader of the SA, who soon became one of his best friends. On 2 January 1931, Schleicher changed the Defense Ministry's rules to allow Nazis to serve in military depots and arsenals, though not as officers, combat troops or sailors. Before 1931, members of the military had been strictly forbidden to join any political parties, because the Reichswehr was supposed to be non-political. It was only Nazis who were allowed to join the Reichswehr in Schleicher's changing of the rules; if a member of the Reichswehr joined any other political party, he would be dishonourably discharged. In March 1931, without the knowledge of either Groener or Adolf Hitler, Schleicher and Röhm reached a secret arrangement that in the event of a war with Poland or a Communist putsch, or both, the SA would mobilise and come under the command of Reichswehr officers in order to deal with the national emergency. The close friendship between Schleicher and Röhm was later, in 1934, to provide a seemingly factual basis to Hitler's claim that Schleicher and Röhm had been plotting to overthrow him, thus justifying the assassination of both.

Like the rest of the Reichswehr leadership, Schleicher saw democracy as an impediment to military power, and was convinced that only a dictatorship could make Germany a great military power again. It was Schleicher's dream to create a Wehrstaat (Military State), in which the military would reorganize German society as part of the preparations for the total war that the Reichswehr wished to wage. From the second half of 1931 onwards, Schleicher was the leading advocate within the German government of the Zähmungskonzept (taming concept) where the Nazis were to be "tamed" by being brought into the government. Schleicher, a militarist to the core, greatly admired the militarism of the Nazis; and the fact that Grenzschutz was working well, especially in East Prussia where the SA was serving as an unofficial militia backing up the Reichswehr was seen as a model for future Army-Nazi co-operation.

Schleicher became a major figure behind the scenes in the presidential cabinet government of Heinrich Brüning between 1930 and 1932, serving as an aide to General Groener, the minister of defense. Eventually, Schleicher, who established a close relationship with Reichspräsident (Reich President) Paul von Hindenburg, came into conflict with Brüning and Groener and his intrigues were largely responsible for their fall in May 1932.

=== Presidential election of 1932 ===
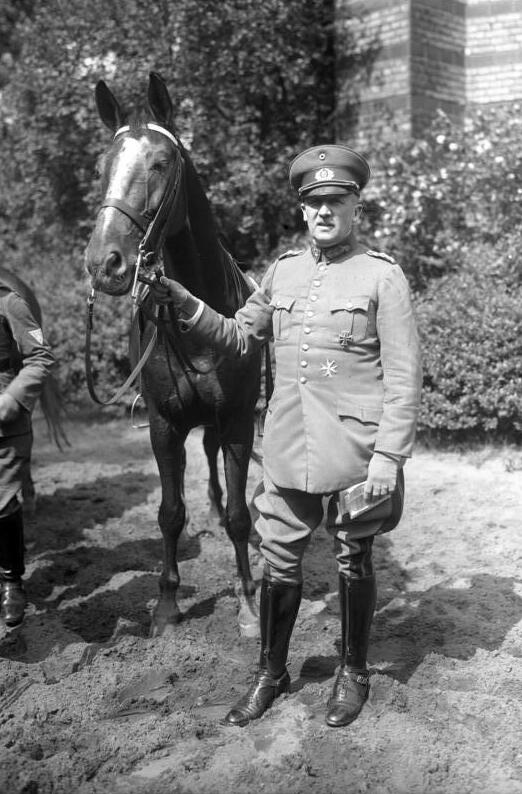
Schleicher before his daily morning ride in the Tiergarten, June 1932

One of Schleicher's aides later recalled that Schleicher viewed the Nazis as "an essentially healthy reaction of the Volkskörper" and praised the Nazis as "the only party that could attract voters away from the radical left and had already done so." In March 1932, he wrote in a letter to Groener about the Nazis: "If they weren't there, one would have to invent them."

Schleicher planned to secure Nazi support for a new right-wing presidential government of his creation, thereby destroying German democracy. Schleicher would then crush the Nazis by exploiting feuds between various Nazi leaders and by incorporating the SA into the Reichswehr. During this period, Schleicher became increasingly convinced that the solution to all of Germany's problems was a "strong man" and that he was that strong man.

Schleicher told Hindenburg that his gruelling re-election campaign was the fault of Brüning. Schleicher claimed that Brüning could have had Hindenburg's term extended by the Reichstag, but that he chose not to in order to humiliate Hindenburg by making him appear on the same stage as Social Democratic leaders. Brüning banned the Sturmabteilung (SA) and the Schutzstaffel (SS) on 13 April 1932 on the grounds that they were chiefly responsible for the wave of political violence afflicting Germany. The banning of the SA and SS saw an immediate and huge drop in the amount of political violence in Germany, but threatened to destroy Schleicher's policy of reaching out to the Nazis, and as a result, Schleicher decided that both Brüning and Groener had to go.

On 16 April, Groener received an angry letter from Hindenburg demanding to know why the Reichsbanner, the paramilitary wing of the Social Democrats, had not also been banned. This was especially the case as Hindenburg said he had solid evidence that the Reichsbanner was planning a coup. The same letter from the president was leaked and appeared that day in all the right-wing German newspapers. Groener discovered that Eugen Ott, a close protégé of Schleicher, had made the Social Democratic putsch allegations to Hindenburg and leaked the president's letter. British historian John Wheeler-Bennett wrote that the evidence for an intended SPD putsch was "flimsy" at best, and this was just Schleicher's way of discrediting Groener in Hindenburg's eyes. Groener's friends told him that it was impossible that Ott would fabricate allegations of that sort or leak the president's letter on his own, and that he should sack Schleicher at once. Groener refused to believe that his old friend had turned on him and refused to fire Schleicher.

At the same time, Schleicher started rumors that General Groener was a secret Social Democrat, and argued that because Groener's daughter was born less than nine months after his marriage, Groener was unfit to hold office. On 8 May 1932, in exchange for promising to dissolve the Reichstag and lift the ban on the SA and the SS, Schleicher received a promise from Hitler to support a new government. After Groener had been savaged in a Reichstag debate with the Nazis over the alleged Social Democratic putsch and Groener's lack of belief in it, Schleicher told his mentor that "he no longer enjoyed the confidence of the Army" and must resign at once, echoing Groener's words to the Kaiser in 1918. When Groener appealed to Hindenburg, the president sided with Schleicher and told Groener to resign. With that, Groener resigned as Defense and Interior Minister.

=== The Papen government ===
On 30 May 1932, Schleicher's intrigues bore fruit when Hindenburg dismissed Brüning as Chancellor and appointed Franz von Papen as his successor. Feuchtwanger called Schleicher the "principal wire-puller" behind Brüning's fall.

Schleicher had chosen Papen, who was unknown to the German public, as the new chancellor because he believed he could control Papen from behind the scenes. Kolb wrote of Schleicher's "key role" in the downfall of not only Brüning, but also the Weimar Republic, for, by bringing down Brüning, Schleicher unintentionally set off a series of events that would lead directly to the Third Reich.

Schleicher's example in bringing down the Brüning government led to a more overt politicization of the Reichswehr. From the spring of 1932, officers such as Werner von Blomberg and Walther von Reichenau had started talks on their own with the NSDAP. Schleicher's example actually served to undermine his own power, since, in part, his power had always rested on the fact that he was the only general who was allowed to talk to the politicians.

=== Minister of defense ===
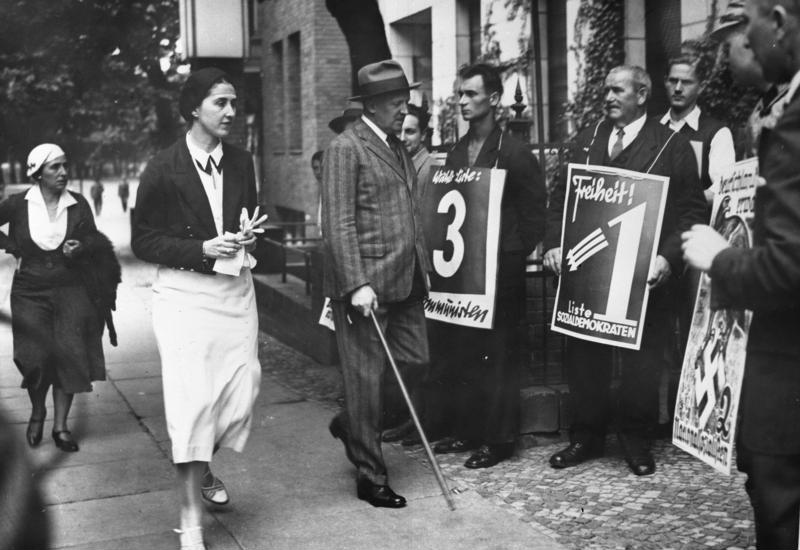
Schleicher with his wife Elisabeth during the Reichstag election of 31 July 1932

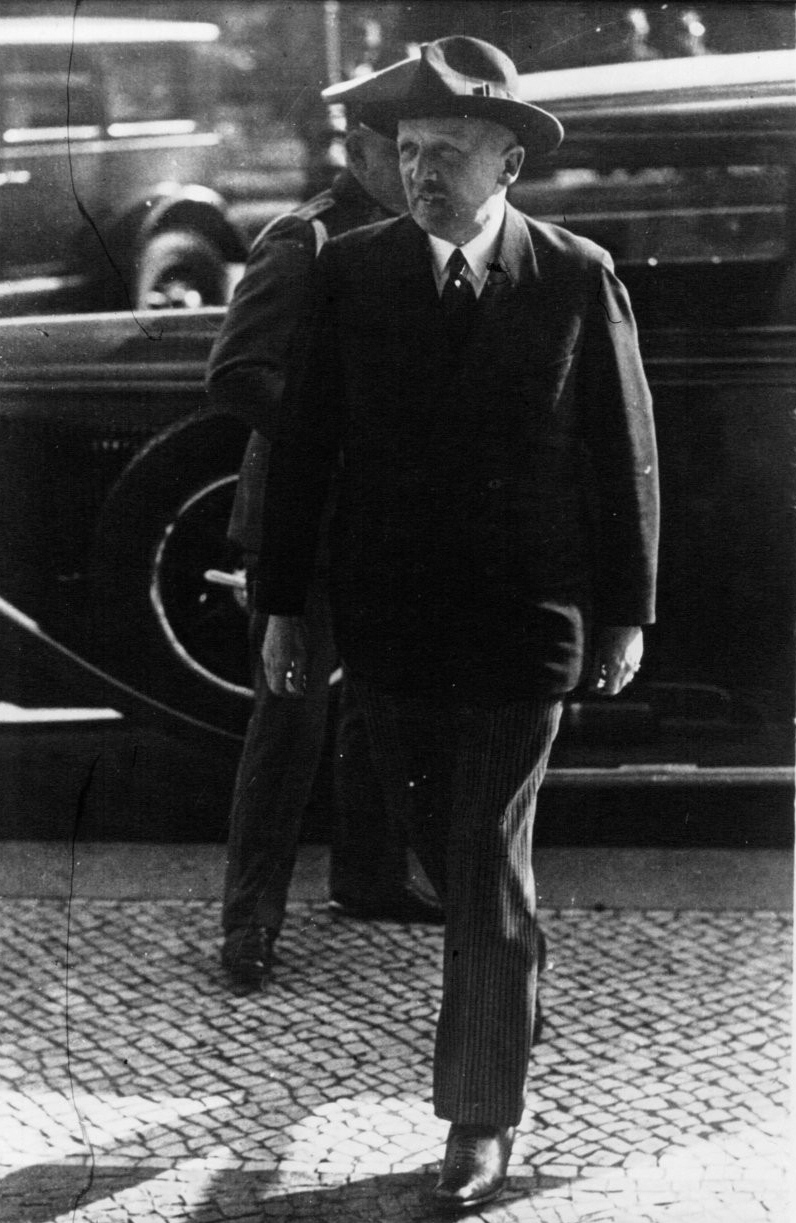
defense Minister Schleicher arriving for the Reichstag session of 12 September 1932

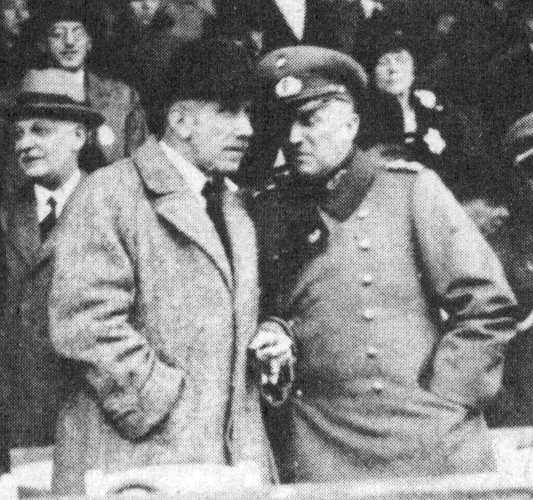
Schleicher (right) with Papen

The new chancellor, Papen, in return appointed Schleicher as minister of defense, who now became General der Infanterie. Schleicher had selected the entire cabinet himself before he even approached Papen with the offer to be Chancellor. The first act of the new government was to dissolve the Reichstag in accordance with Schleicher's "gentlemen's agreement" with Hitler on 4 June 1932. On 15 June 1932, the new government lifted the ban on the SA and the SS, who were secretly encouraged to indulge in as much violence as possible, both to discredit democracy and to provide a pretext for the new authoritarian regime Schleicher was working to create.

Besides ordering new Reichstag elections, Schleicher and Papen worked together to undermine the Social Democratic government of Prussia headed by Otto Braun. Schleicher fabricated evidence that the Prussian police under Braun's orders were favoring the Communist Rotfrontkämpferbund in street clashes with the SA, which he used to get an emergency decree from Hindenburg imposing Reich control on Prussia. To facilitate his plans for a coup against the Prussian government and to avert the danger of a general strike which had defeated the Kapp Putsch of 1920, Schleicher had a series of secret meetings with trade union leaders, during which he promised them a leading role in the new authoritarian political system he was building, in return for which he received a promise that there would be no general strike in support of Braun.

In the "Rape of Prussia" on 20 July 1932, Schleicher had martial law proclaimed and called out the Reichswehr under Gerd von Rundstedt to oust the elected Prussian government, which was accomplished without a shot being fired. Using Article 48, Hindenburg named Papen the Reich Commissioner of Prussia. To help with advice for the new regime that he was planning to create, in the summer of 1932 Schleicher engaged the services of a group of right-wing intellectuals known as the Tatkreis, and through them got to know Gregor Strasser.

In the Reichstag election of 31 July 1932, the NSDAP became the largest party as expected. In August 1932, Hitler reneged on the "gentlemen's agreement" he made with Schleicher that May, and instead of supporting the Papen government, demanded the chancellorship for himself. Schleicher was willing to accept Hitler's demand, but Hindenburg refused, preventing Hitler from receiving the chancellorship in August 1932. Schleicher's influence with Hindenburg started to decline. Papen himself was most offended at the way Schleicher was prepared to forsake him casually.

On 12 September 1932, Papen's government was defeated on a no-confidence motion in the Reichstag, at which point the Reichstag was again dissolved. In the election of 6 November 1932, the NSDAP lost seats, but still remained the largest party. By the beginning of November, Papen had shown himself to be more assertive than Schleicher had expected; this led to a growing rift between the two. Schleicher brought down Papen's government on 3 December 1932, when Papen told the Cabinet that he wished to declare martial law rather than lose face after another motion of no-confidence. Schleicher released the results of a war game which showed that if martial law was declared, the Reichswehr would not be able to defeat the various paramilitary groups. With the martial law option now off the table, Papen was forced to resign and Schleicher became chancellor. This war games study, which was done by and presented to the Cabinet by one of Schleicher's close aides, General Eugen Ott, was rigged with the aim of forcing Papen to resign. Papen became consumed with hatred against his former friend who had forced him from office.

=== Chancellorship ===
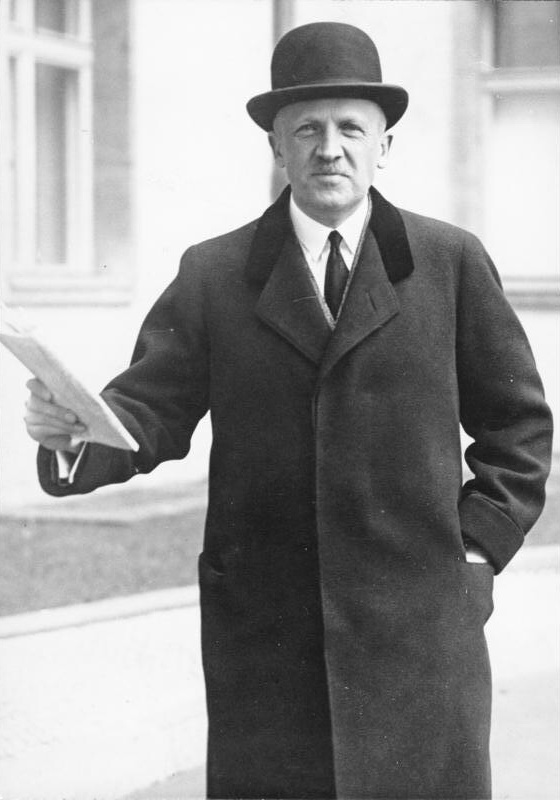
Schleicher on 3 December 1932, just after his appointment as Chancellor by Hindenburg

Schleicher hoped to attain a majority in the Reichstag by gaining the support of the Nazis for his government. In mid-December 1932, Schleicher told a meeting of senior military leaders that the collapse of the Nazi movement was not in the best interests of the German state. By the end of 1932, the NSDAP was running out of money, increasingly prone to in-fighting and was discouraged by the Reichstag election of November 1932 where the party had lost votes. Schleicher took the view that the NSDAP would sooner or later have to support his government because only he could offer the Nazis power and otherwise the NSDAP would continue to disintegrate.

To gain Nazi support while keeping himself chancellor, Schleicher talked of forming a so-called Querfront ("cross-front"), whereby he would unify Germany's fractious special interests around a non-parliamentary, authoritarian, but participatory regime as a way of forcing the Nazis to support his government. It was hoped that, faced with the threat of the Querfront, Hitler would back down in his demand for the chancellorship and support Schleicher's government instead. Schleicher was never serious about creating a Querfront; he intended it to be a bluff to compel the NSDAP to support the new government. As part of his attempt to pressure Hitler into supporting his government, Schleicher went through the motions of attempting to found the Querfront by reaching out to the Social Democratic labor unions, the Christian labor unions, and the economically left-wing branch of the Nazi Party, led by Gregor Strasser.

On 4 December 1932, Schleicher met with Strasser and offered to restore the Prussian government from Reich control and make Strasser the new Minister-President of Prussia. Schleicher's hope was that the threat of a split within the Nazi Party, with Strasser leading his faction out of the party, would force Hitler to support the new government. Schleicher's policy failed as Hitler isolated Strasser in the party.

One of the main initiatives of the Schleicher government was a public works program intended to counter the effects of the Great Depression in Germany, which was shepherded by Günther Gereke, whom Schleicher had appointed special commissioner for employment. The various public works projects—which were to give 2 million unemployed Germans jobs by July 1933 and are often wrongly attributed to Hitler — were the work of the Schleicher government, which had passed the necessary legislation in January.

Schleicher's relations with his Cabinet were poor because of Schleicher's secretive ways and open contempt for his ministers. With two exceptions, Schleicher retained all of Papen's cabinet, which meant that much of the unpopularity of the Papen government was inherited by Schleicher's government. Shortly after Schleicher became chancellor, he told a joke at the expense of Major Oskar von Hindenburg, which greatly offended the younger Hindenburg and reduced Schleicher's access to the president. Papen, by contrast, had been able to stay on excellent terms with both Hindenburgs.

Regarding tariffs, Schleicher refused to make a firm stand. Schleicher's non-policy on tariffs hurt his government very badly when, on 11 January 1933, the leaders of the Agricultural League launched a blistering attack on Schleicher in front of Hindenburg. The Agricultural League leaders attacked Schleicher for his failure to keep his promise to raise tariffs on food imports and for allowing a law from the Papen government that gave farmers a grace period from foreclosure if they defaulted on their debts. Hindenburg forced Schleicher to accede to all of the League's demands.

In foreign policy, Schleicher's main interest was in winning Gleichberechtigung ("equality of status") at the World Disarmament Conference, which would do away with Part V of the Treaty of Versailles that had disarmed Germany. Schleicher made a point of cultivating the French ambassador André François-Poncet and stressing his concern with improving Franco-German relations. This was in part because Schleicher wanted to ensure French acceptance of Gleichberechtigung in order to allow Germany to rearm without fear of a French "preventative war." He also believed that improving Berlin-Paris relations would lead the French to abrogate the Franco-Polish alliance of 1921, which would allow Germany to partition Poland with the Soviet Union without having to go to war with France. In a speech before a group of German journalists on 13 January 1933, Schleicher proclaimed that based on the acceptance "in principle" of Gleichberechtigung by the other powers at the World Disarmament Conference in December 1932, he planned to have by no later than the spring of 1934 a return to conscription and for Germany to have all the weapons forbidden by Versailles.

=== Political misstep ===
On 20 January 1933, Schleicher missed one of his best chances to save his government. Wilhelm Frick — who was in charge of the Nazi Reichstag delegation when Hermann Göring was not present — suggested to the Reichstag's agenda committee that the Reichstag go into recess until the next budget could be presented, which would have been some time in the spring. Had this happened, by the time the recess ended, Schleicher would have been reaping the benefits of the public works projects that his government had begun in January, and in-fighting within the NSDAP would have worsened. Schleicher had his Chief of Staff, Erwin Planck, tell the Reichstag that the government wanted the recess to be as short as possible, which led to the recess being extended only to 31 January as Schleicher believed mistakenly that the Reichstag would not dare bring a motion of no-confidence against him as that would mean another election.

The ousted Papen now had Hindenburg's ear, and used his position to advise the president to sack Schleicher at the first chance. Papen was urging the aged president to appoint Hitler as chancellor in a coalition with the Nationalist Deutschnationale Volkspartei (German National People's Party; DNVP), who, together with Papen, would supposedly work to rein in Hitler. Papen was holding secret meetings with both Hitler and Hindenburg, who then refused Schleicher's request for emergency powers and another dissolution of the Reichstag. Schleicher for a long time refused to take seriously the possibility that Papen was working to bring him down.

The consequence of promoting the idea of presidential government where everything depended upon President Hindenburg's whims, with the Reichstag weakened, meant that when Hindenburg decided against Schleicher, the latter was in an extremely weak political position. By January 1933, Schleicher's reputation as the destroyer of governments, as a man who was just as happy intriguing against his friends as his enemies, and as a man who had betrayed all who had trusted him, meant he was universally distrusted and disliked by all factions, which further weakened his attempts to stay in power.

On 28 January 1933, Schleicher told his Cabinet that he needed a decree from the president to dissolve the Reichstag, or otherwise his government was likely to be defeated on a no-confidence vote when the Reichstag reconvened on 31 January. Schleicher then went to see Hindenburg to ask for the dissolution decree and was refused. Upon his return to meet with the Cabinet, Schleicher announced his intention to resign and signed a decree allowing for 500 million Reichsmarks to be spent on public works projects. Schleicher thought his successor was going to be Papen, and as such, it was towards blocking that event that Schleicher devoted his energy.

On 29 January, Werner von Blomberg was sworn in by Hindenburg as defense minister promptly and in an illegal manner because in late January 1933 there were wild and untrue rumors circulating in Berlin that Schleicher was planning on staging a putsch.

The military, which until that moment had been Schleicher's strongest bastion of support, now suddenly withdrew its support, seeing the Nazis and not Schleicher as the only ones who could mobilise popular support for a Wehrstaat (Defense State). By late January 1933, most senior officers in the Army were advising Hindenburg that Schleicher needed to go.

=== Support for Hitler's chancellorship ===
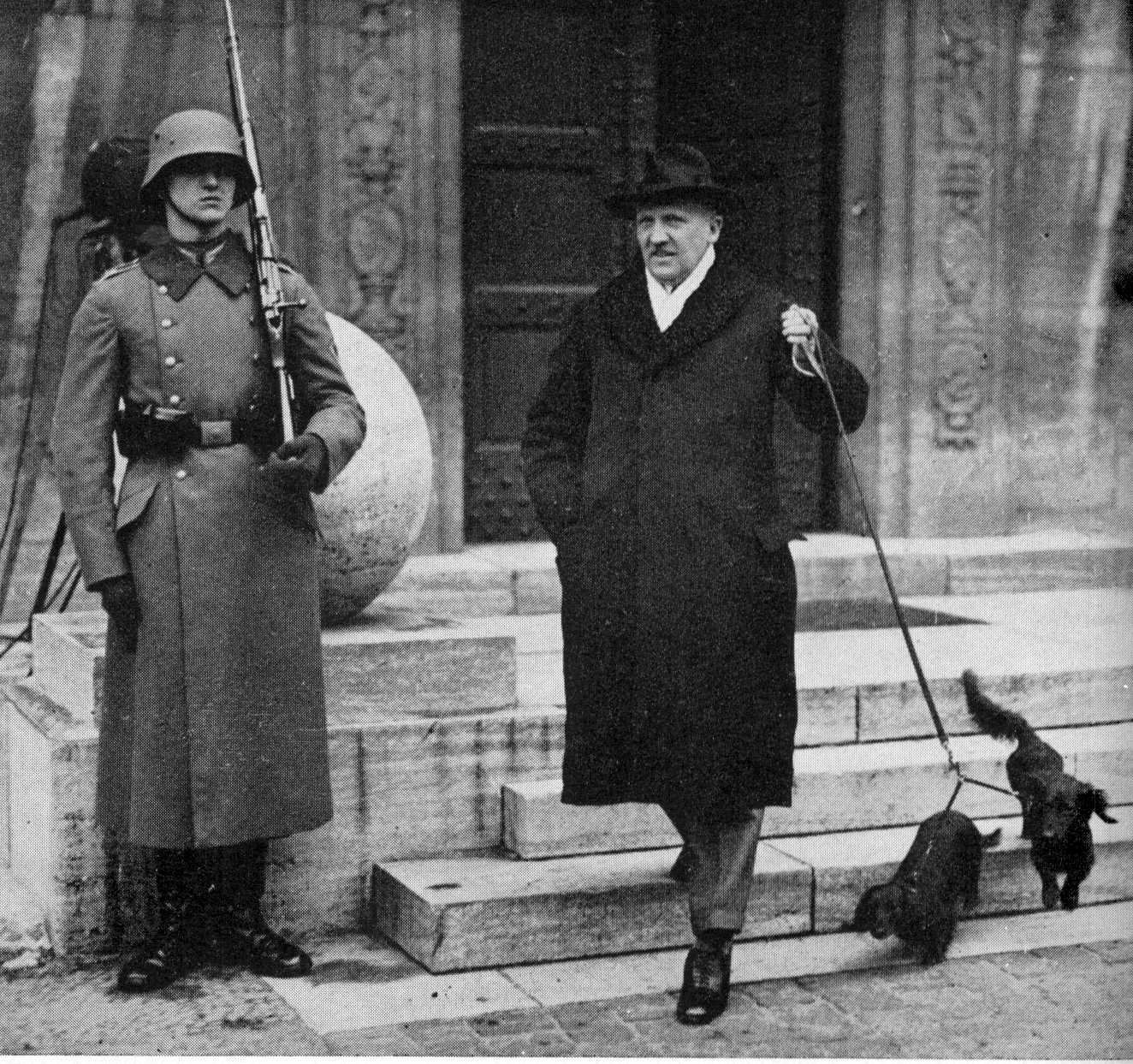
Schleicher in February 1933

That same day, Schleicher, learning that his government was about to fall, and fearing that his rival Papen would get the chancellorship, began to favor a Hitler chancellorship. Knowing of Papen's by now boundless hatred for him, Schleicher knew he had no chance of becoming defense minister in a new Papen government, but he felt his chances of becoming the defense minister in a Hitler government were very good.

Hitler was initially willing to support Schleicher as defense minister, but a meeting with Schleicher's associate Werner von Alvensleben convinced Hitler that Schleicher was about to launch a putsch to keep him out of power. In a climate of crisis, with wild rumors running rampant that Schleicher was moving troops into Berlin to depose Hindenburg, Papen convinced the president to appoint Hitler chancellor the next day. The president dismissed Schleicher, calling Hitler into power on 30 January 1933. In the following months, the Nazis issued the Reichstag Fire Decree and the Enabling Act, transforming Germany into a dictatorship.

== Assassination ==
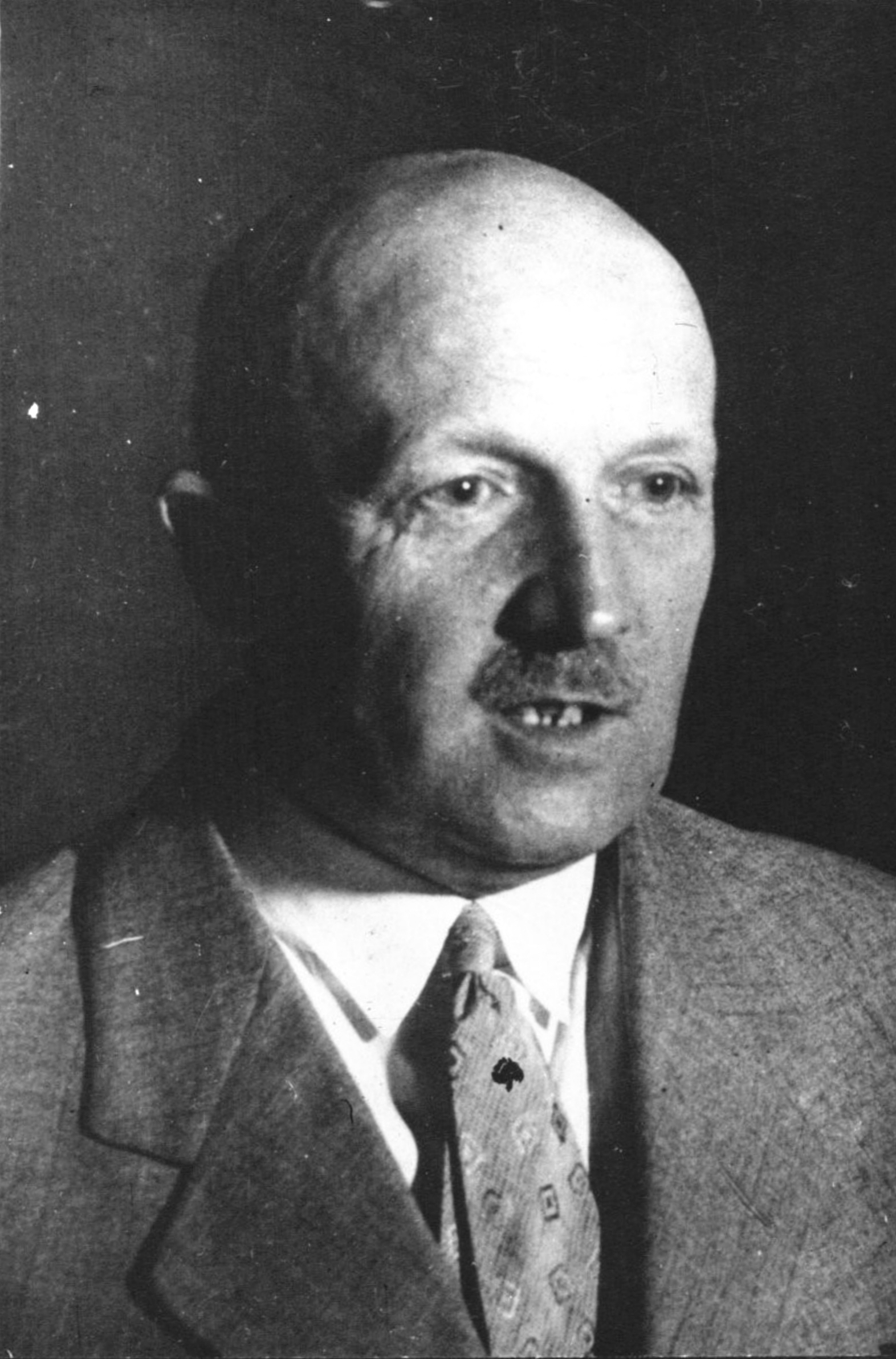
Schleicher in 1933

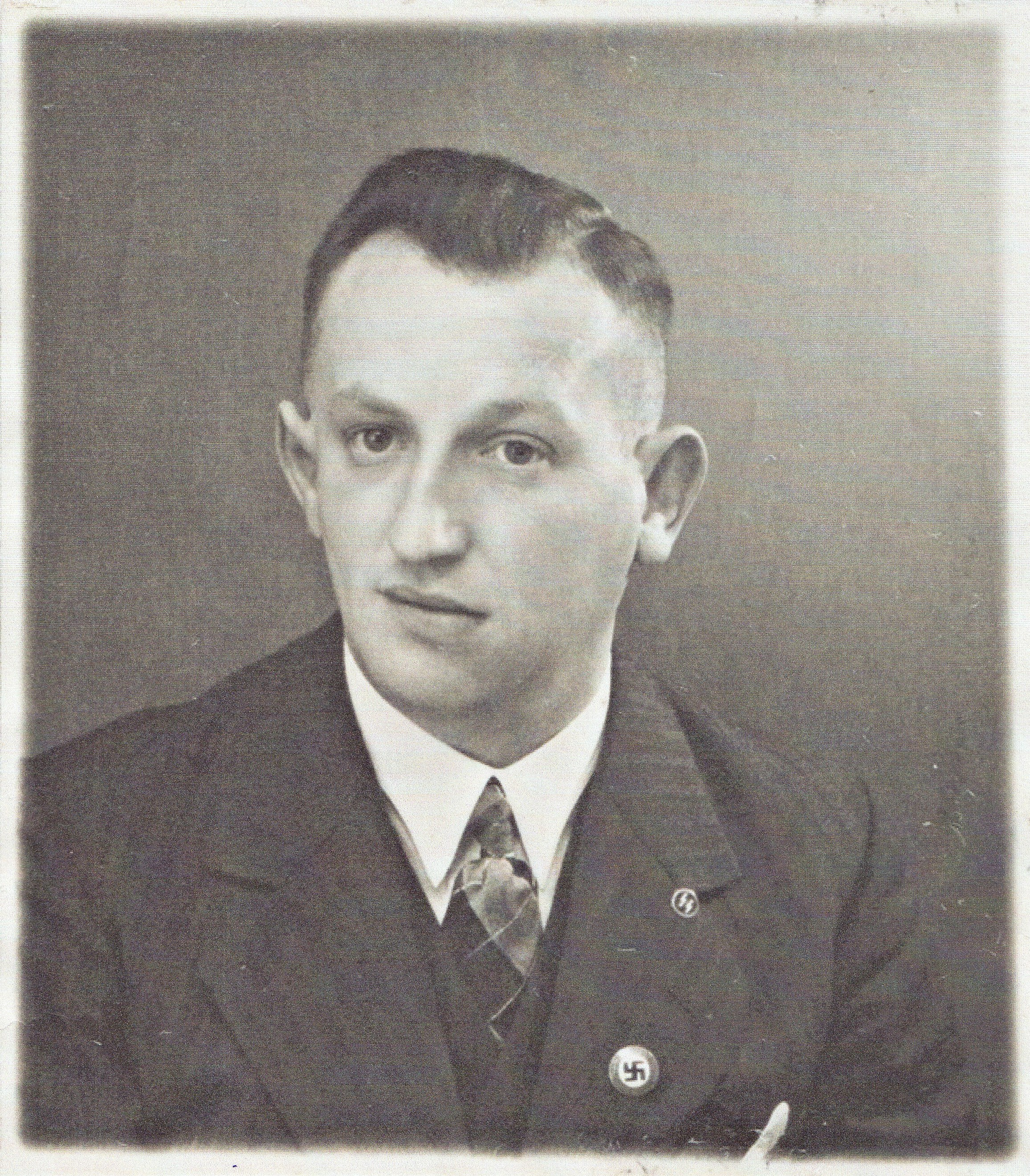
Johannes Schmidt, who is regarded as the man who carried out the killing of Schleicher

Schleicher's successor as defense minister was his arch-enemy, Werner von Blomberg. One of Blomberg's first acts as defense minister was to carry out a purge of the officers associated with Schleicher. Blomberg sacked Ferdinand von Bredow as chief of the Ministeramt and replaced him with General Walter von Reichenau, Eugen Ott was dismissed as chief of the Wehramt (the German armed forces, soon to be renamed to Wehrmacht) and exiled to Japan as military attaché, and General Wilhelm Adam was fired as chief of the Truppenamt (the disguised General Staff) and replaced with Ludwig Beck. The Army Commander-in-Chief and close associate of Schleicher's, General Kurt von Hammerstein-Equord, resigned in despair in February 1934 as his powers had become more nominal than real. With Hammerstein's resignation, the entire Schleicher faction, which dominated the Army since 1926, had all been removed from their positions within the High Command, and thus destroyed any remaining source of power for Schleicher.

In the spring of 1934, hearing of the growing rift between Ernst Röhm and Hitler over the role of the SA in the Nazi state, Schleicher began playing politics again. Schleicher criticised the current Hitler cabinet, while some of Schleicher's followers — such as General Ferdinand von Bredow and Werner von Alvensleben — started passing along lists of a new Hitler Cabinet in which Schleicher would become vice-chancellor, Röhm minister of defense, Brüning foreign minister and Strasser minister of national economy. Schleicher believed that as a Reichswehr general and as a close friend of Röhm, he could successfully mediate the dispute between Röhm and the military over Röhm's demands that the SA absorb the Reichswehr, and that as such Hitler would fire Blomberg and give him back his old job as defense minister.

Hitler had considered Schleicher a target for assassination for some time. When the Night of the Long Knives occurred from 30 June to 2 July 1934, Schleicher was one of the chief victims. At about 10:30 am on 30 June 1934, a group of men wearing trench coats and fedoras emerged from a car parked on the street outside Schleicher's villa (Griebnitzstrasse 4, Neubabelsberg near Potsdam) and walked up to Schleicher's home. While Schleicher was talking on the phone, he heard somebody knocking at his door, and he put the phone down. Schleicher's last words, heard by his friend on the phone, were "Jawohl, ich bin General von Schleicher" ("Yes, I am General von Schleicher"), followed by two shots. Upon hearing the shots, his wife Elisabeth von Schleicher ran into the front lobby, where she was shot as well. Schleicher died at the scene and his wife succumbed to her injuries en route to the hospital; she never regained consciousness. It is likely that her murder was collateral, as Goebbels noted in his diary for the day: "In Berlin everything according to plan, besides that little hitch about Elisabeth von Schleicher dying too. Pity, but it couldn't be helped."

=== Funeral ===
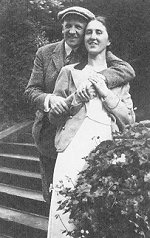
Schleicher with his wife Elisabeth in 1931

At his funeral, Schleicher's friend von Hammerstein was offended when the SS refused to allow him to attend the service and confiscated wreaths that the mourners had brought. Hammerstein and Generalfeldmarschall August von Mackensen began trying to have Schleicher rehabilitated. The army somehow obtained Schleicher's file from the SS. Mackensen led a meeting of 400 officers that drank a toast to Schleicher and entered his and Bredow's names into the regimental honor roll.

In his speech to the Reichstag on 13 July, justifying his actions, Hitler denounced Schleicher for conspiring with Röhm to overthrow the government. Hitler alleged that both Schleicher and Röhm were traitors working on the pay of France. As Schleicher had been a good friend of André François-Poncet, and because of his reputation for intrigue, the claim that Schleicher was working for France had enough surface plausibility for most Germans to accept it, although it was not true. The falsity of Hitler's claims could be seen in that François-Poncet was not declared persona non grata as normally would happen if an ambassador was caught being involved in a coup plot against his host government. François-Poncet stayed on as French ambassador in Berlin until October 1938, which is incompatible with Hitler's claim that the Frenchman had been involved in a plot to overthrow him.

The army's support for clearing Schleicher's reputation was effective. In late 1934 – early 1935, Werner von Fritsch and Werner von Blomberg, whom Hammerstein had shamed into joining his campaign, pressured Hitler into rehabilitating General von Schleicher, claiming that as officers they could not stand the press attacks on Schleicher, which portrayed him as a traitor working for France. In a speech given on 3 January 1935 at the Berlin State Opera, Hitler stated that Schleicher had been shot "in error", that his murder had been ordered on the basis of false information and that Schleicher's name was to be restored to the honor roll of his regiment.

The remarks rehabilitating Schleicher were not published in the German press, although Generalfeldmarschall von Mackensen announced Schleicher's rehabilitation at a public gathering of General Staff officers on 28 February 1935. As far as the Army was concerned, the matter of Schleicher's murder was settled. The Nazis continued in private to accuse Schleicher of high treason. Hermann Göring told Jan Szembek during a visit to Warsaw in January 1935 that Schleicher had urged Hitler in January 1933 to reach an understanding with France and the Soviet Union, and partition Poland with the latter, which was why Hitler had Schleicher assassinated. Hitler told the Polish Ambassador Józef Lipski on 22 May 1935 that Schleicher was "rightfully murdered, if only because he had sought to maintain the Rapallo Treaty". On hearing of the assassination, former German emperor Wilhelm II, living in exile in the Netherlands, commented, "We have ceased to live under the rule of law and everyone must be prepared for the possibility that the Nazis will push their way in and put them up against the wall!"

Political offices
Preceded by Wilhelm Groener	Minister of defense 1932	Succeeded by Werner von Blomberg
Preceded by Franz von Papen	Chancellor of Germany; 1932 – 1933	Succeeded by Adolf Hitler
Preceded by Franz von Papen	Minister President of Prussia; 1932 – 1933	Succeeded by Franz von Papen
