= 1933 German election =

1933 German election may refer to:

- March 1933 German federal election
- November 1933 German parliamentary election
