= Elard von Oldenburg-Januschau =

German politician (1855–1937)

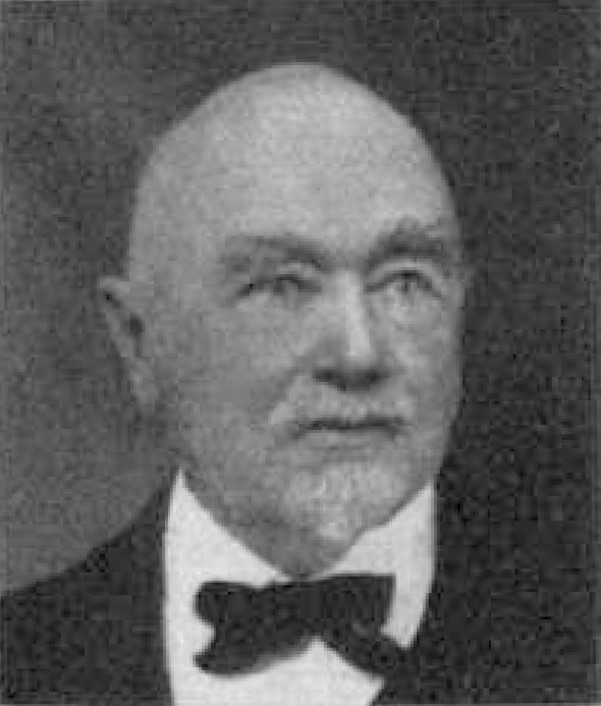
- Born: 20 March 1855; Beisleiden, East Prussia, Kingdom of Prussia
- Died: 16 August 1937 (aged 82); Marienwerder, Germany
- Occupation: Politician
- Political party: Conservatives; DNVP
- Spouse: Agnes von Kanitz (m. 1884–1937)

Elard Kurt Maria Fürchtegott von Oldenburg-Januschau (20 March 1855 – 16 August 1937) was a German Junker (a member of the Prussian nobility prior to the abolition of the monarchy) and conservative politician.

He embodied the prototype of the arch-conservative, militaristic and anti-democratic East Elbian Junkers both in the German Empire and in the Weimar Republic.

== Biography ==
Oldenburg was born at his family's manor of Beisleiden, Kreis Pr. Eylau, East Prussia (today Bezledy, Poland), to Botho von Oldenburg and Maria née von Arnim. He served in the 2. Garde-Ulanen-Regiment of the Prussian Army in Berlin and Potsdam for eight years and came into contact with Kaiser William I, Otto von Bismarck, Helmuth von Moltke and Albrecht von Roon. After the death of his brother Botho in 1882 he returned to his manor at Januschau and after his father died in 1885 Oldenburg also took over the ownership of Beisleiden.

In 1884 Oldenburg married Agnes Gräfin von Kanitz, they had three daughters.

In 1901 Oldenburg became a member of the Prussian Landtag (until 1910) and in 1902 of the Reichstag (until 1912) for German Conservative Party. He was an exponent of the antidemocratic conservatives and became well known for his dictum: "The King of Prussia and German Emperor must always be able say to a lieutenant: take ten men and lock up the Reichstag".

Oldenburg was the only member of the Reichstag to defend Kaiser William II throughout the Daily Telegraph Affair and called the Social Democrats, who disturbed his speech, a "mob of pigs" (Schweinebande).

Oldenburg was again elected as a member of the Reichstag for the conservative DNVP in 1930 until 1932. In January 1933, Oldenburg-Januschau played an important role in bringing Adolf Hitler to power by advising his friend President Paul von Hindenburg that he should appoint Hitler Chancellor.

Oldenburg died on 16 August 1937 in Marienwerder (today Kwidzyn).
