= Medingen (Bad Bevensen) =

Coordinates: 53.0915°N 10.56198°E

Medingen (German pronunciation: [ˈmeːdɪŋən]) is a village in the borough of Bad Bevensen in the German state of Lower Saxony. In the 14th century it was called Zellensen.

In the 17th century a monastic farm estate known as Klosterhof Medingen (Medingen Monastery Estate) where, 50 years ago, a Trakehner stud was established.

== Medingen Abbey ==
In 1228 the convent was founded as a branch of the Cistercian nunnery at Wolmirstedt (north of Magdeburg). In 1336 it was permanently established in Medingen. The monastery was originally built in the Brick Gothic style.

The majority of nuns were unmarried daughters of Lüneburg patrician families who joined the convent with large household staff and so increased the numbers living at the convent. Over the course of time the monastery was given rights to the Lüneburg Saltworks, to taxes, mills and shipping on the River Ilmenau.

In the early 16th century, in its heyday, the monastery was home to over 100 nuns.

In 1524, in the wake of the Reformation, the lord over the area, Duke Ernest the Confessor of Brunswick-Lüneburg issued the decree to transform it into a Lutheran establishment. The convent opposed this for more than 30 years in the "Nun's War" (Nonnenkrieg); the abbess had publicly burned the Lutheran Bible. In 1539 seized the monastery's property and had part of it torn down. In 1555, after the Lutheran creed was accepted the monastery was given some of its property back. In 1559 it was converted into a Lutheran women's convent.

In 1781 the buildings of the old monastery burnt down, apart from the brewery (Brauhaus). By 1787 it had been rebuilt, mainly in late baroque, but partly neoclassical style. There are two long convent wings with the church in the centre.

The convent has been run by abbesses right up to the present day. Medingen Abbey is one of the Lüneklöster that is managed by the monastic chamber in Hanover under the legal supervision of the lady president.
