= Gerd von Rundstedt =

German field marshal (1875–1953)

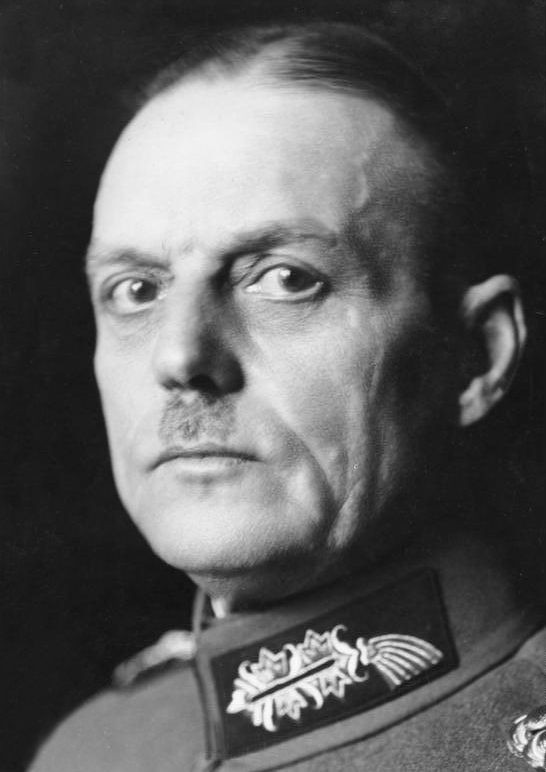
- Rundstedt in 1932
- Born: Karl Rudolf Gerd von Rundstedt; 12 December 1875; Aschersleben, Saxony, Prussia, Germany
- Died: 24 February 1953 (aged 77); Hanover, Lower Saxony, West Germany
- Burial place: Stöckener Cemetery
- Spouse: Luise "Bila" Agathe Marie von Götz (m. 1902)
- Children: 1
- Relatives: Georg Heinrici (cousin); Gotthard Heinrici (cousin); Rudolf Graf von Schmettow (nephew)
- Military career
- Allegiance: Prussia; Germany
- Branch: Imperial German Army; Prussian Army; Reichswehr; German Army
- Service years: 1892–1945
- Rank: Generalfeldmarschall
- Commands: Imperial German Army: 171th Infantry Regiment; Reichswehr: 18th Infantry Regiment; 2nd Cavalry Division; Wehrmacht: Gruppenkommando I Berlin; Armeeoberkommando 12; Army Group South; Army Group A; OB West
- Conflicts: See battles: World War I; Western Front; First Battle of the Marne (1914); World War II; Invasion of Poland; Battle of the Bzura (1939); Western Front; Battle of Belgium; Battle of France; Battle of Sedan (1940); Battle of Dunkirk (1940); Dieppe Raid (1942); Battle of Normandy (1944); Siegfried Line Campaign (1944); Operation Market Garden (1944); Operation Queen (1944); Battle of the Bulge (1944–1945); Western Allied invasion of Germany (1945); Eastern Front; Operation Barbarossa (1941); Battle of Uman (1941); First Battle of Kiev (1941); Battle of the Sea of Azov (1941); First Battle of Rostov (1941)
- Awards: Knight's Cross of the Iron Cross with Oak Leaves and Swords

Karl Rudolf Gerd von Rundstedt (12 December 1875 – 24 February 1953) was a German Generalfeldmarschall (Field Marshal) in the Heer (Army) of Nazi Germany and Oberbefehlshaber West (Commander-in-Chief in the West) during World War II. At the end of the war, aged 69, with over 52 years of service, he was the Army's most senior officer.

Born into a Prussian family with a long military tradition, Gerd von Rundstedt entered the Prussian Army in 1892. During World War I, he served mainly as a staff officer. In the interwar period, he continued his military career, reaching the rank of Generaloberst (Colonel General) before retiring in 1938.

At the beginning of World War II in 1939, Rundstedt was recalled to military service to take part in Germany's successful invasion of Poland. Thereafter, in 1940, he commanded Army Group A during the Battle of France and was subsequently promoted to the rank of Field Marshal for his actions during the campaign. On 22 June 1941, Rundstedt led Army Group South during Germany's invasion of the Soviet Union. In this role, he oversaw the largest encirclement in military history at the Battle of Kiev in September 1941. Later in December, Adolf Hitler relieved Rundstedt of his command when he authorized the withdrawal of German forces from Rostov to avoid destruction by a Soviet counteroffensive. However, in 1942, he was recalled and named Commander-in-Chief in the West.

After his defeat by the Western Allies at Normandy in July 1944, Field Marshal Rundstedt was dismissed from his command before once again being recalled as Commander-in-Chief in the West in September 1944. He subsequently held this post until Hitler dismissed him for the last time in March 1945. Though aware of various plots to depose Hitler, Rundstedt neither supported nor reported them. He also served as chairman of the Ehrenhof, a military committee discharging 20 July plotters from the Wehrmacht, so that they could be tried and murdered by the Volksgerichtshof, a show trial. Upon the war's end, Rundstedt was charged with war crimes, but did not face trial due to his age and poor health. He was released in 1949 and died in 1953.

== Early life ==
Gerd von Rundstedt was born in Aschersleben, north of Halle in Prussian Saxony (now in Saxony-Anhalt). He was the eldest son of Gerd Arnold Konrad von Rundstedt, a cavalry officer who served in the Franco-Prussian War. The Rundstedts are an old Junker family that traced its origins to the 12th century and were classed as members of the Uradel, or old nobility, although they held no titles and were not wealthy. Virtually all the Rundstedt men since the time of Frederick the Great had served in the Prussian Army. Rundstedt's mother, Adelheid Fischer, was of Huguenot (French Protestant) descent. He was the eldest of four brothers, all of whom became Army officers. Rundstedt's education followed the path ordained for Prussian military families: the junior cadet college at Diez, near Koblenz, then the military academy at Lichterfelde in Berlin.

Unable to meet the cost of joining a cavalry regiment, Rundstedt joined the 83rd Infantry Regiment in March 1892 as a cadet officer (Portepee Fähnrich). The regiment was based at Kassel in Hesse-Kassel, which he came to regard as his home town and where he maintained a home until 1945. He undertook further training at the military college (Kriegsschule) at Hannover, before being commissioned as a lieutenant in June 1893. He made a good impression on his superiors. In 1896, he was made regimental adjutant, and in 1903, he was sent to the prestigious War Academy (Kriegsakademie) in Berlin for a three-year staff officer training course. At the end of his course, Rundstedt was described by his final report as "an outstandingly able officer [...] well suited for the General Staff." He married Luise "Bila" von Goetz in January 1902 and their only child, Hans Gerd von Rundstedt, was born in January 1903.

Rundstedt joined the General Staff of the German Army in April 1907, serving there until July 1914, when he was appointed chief of operations to the 22nd Reserve Infantry Division. This division was part of XI Corps, which in turn was part of General Alexander von Kluck's First Army. In 1914, this Army was deployed along the Belgian border, in preparation for the invasion of Belgium and France, in accordance with the German plan for victory in the west known as the Schlieffen Plan.

== World War I ==
Rundstedt served as the 22nd Division's chief of staff during the invasion of Belgium, but he saw no action since his Division was held in reserve during the initial advance. In December 1914, suffering from a lung ailment, he was promoted to major and transferred to the military government of Antwerp. In April 1915, his health recovered, and he was posted as chief of staff to the 86th Infantry Division, which was serving as part of General Max von Gallwitz's forces on the Eastern Front. In September, he was once again given an administrative post, as part of the military government of German-occupied Poland, based in Warsaw. He stayed in this post until November 1916, when he was promoted by being made chief of staff to an Army Corps, XXV Reserve Corps, which was fighting in the Carpathians. Here he saw much action against the Russians. In October 1917, he was appointed chief of staff to LIII Corps, in northern Poland. The following month, however, the October Revolution led to the collapse of the Russian armies and the end of the war on the eastern front. In August 1918, Rundstedt was transferred to the west, as chief of staff to XV Corps in Alsace, under General Felix Graf von Bothmer. Here he remained until the end of the war in November. Bothmer described him as "a wholly excellent staff officer and amiable comrade." He was awarded the Iron Cross, first class, and was recommended for the Pour le Mérite, but did not receive it. He thus ended World War I, although still a major, with a high reputation as a staff officer.

== Weimar Republic ==
Rundstedt's Corps disintegrated in the wake of defeat and the German Revolution, but while most officers were demobilised, he remained in the Army, apparently at the request of General Wilhelm Groener, who assumed leadership of the shattered Army. He briefly rejoined the General Staff, but this was abolished under the terms of the Treaty of Versailles, signed in June 1919. In October, Rundstedt was posted to the staff of Military District (Wehrkreis) V, based in Stuttgart, under General Walter von Bergmann. He was there when the attempted military coup known as the Kapp Putsch took place in March 1920. Bergmann and Rundstedt, like most of the Army leadership, refused to support the coup attempt: Rundstedt later described it as "a failure and a very stupid one at that." This was not an indication of any fondness for the Weimar Republic on Rundstedt's part – he remained a monarchist. It was a reflection of his view that Army officers should not interfere in politics, and should support the government of the day, whatever its nature: a view he was to hold firmly throughout his career. He testified at the Nuremberg trials in 1946: "We generals did not concern ourselves with politics. We did not take part in any political discussions, and we did not hold any political discussions among ourselves".

Rundstedt rose steadily in the small 100,000-man army (the Reichswehr) allowed to Germany by the Versailles Treaty. In May 1920, he was made chief of staff to the 3rd Cavalry Division, based in Weimar, thus achieving his early ambition of being a cavalry commander. He was promoted to lieutenant-colonel (Oberstleutnant) in 1920, and to full colonel in 1923, when he was transferred to Wehrkreis II, based in Stettin. In 1926, he was made chief of staff to Group Command (Gruppenkommando) 2, which covered the whole of western Germany and was based in Kassel, and promoted to major general (Generalmajor). In 1928, Rundstedt finally left staff positions behind him and was made commander of the 2nd Cavalry Division, based in Breslau. This was considered a front-line posting, given Germany's tense relations with Poland and the fact that Poland at this time had a much bigger army than Germany.

In January 1932, Rundstedt was appointed commander of Wehrkreis III, based in Berlin, and also given command of the 3rd Infantry Division. This brought him, at 57, into the highest ranks of the German Army, reflected in his promotion to Lieutenant General (Generalleutnant). It also inevitably brought him into close contact with the political world, which was in a disturbed state due to the Great Depression and subsequent rise of Hitler's Nazi Party. The defence minister, General Kurt von Schleicher, was scheming to bring the Nazis into the government, and the chancellor, Franz von Papen, was planning to overthrow the Social Democrat government of Prussia, Germany's largest state. Despite his dislike of politics, Rundstedt could not remain uninvolved in these matters. In July 1932, Papen used his emergency powers to dismiss the Prussian Government. Martial law was briefly declared in Berlin and Rundstedt was made martial law plenipotentiary. He protested to Papen about this and martial law was lifted after a few days. In October, Rundstedt was promoted to full General and given command of Gruppenkommando 1, covering the whole of eastern Germany.

== Serving the Nazi regime ==
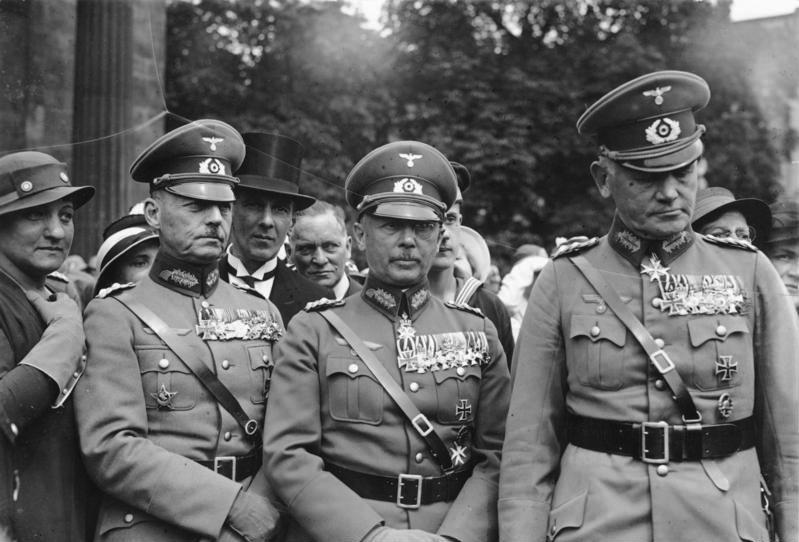
Rundstedt, Werner von Fritsch and Werner von Blomberg at a memorial service, Unter den Linden, Berlin 1934

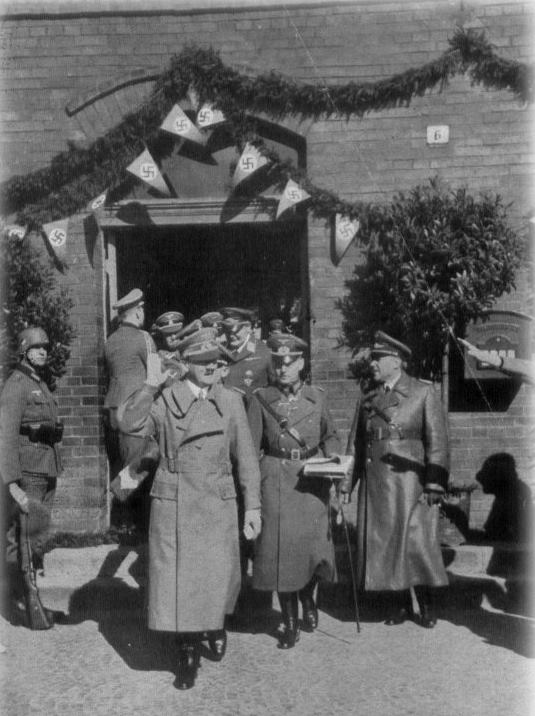
Rundstedt, Hitler, Göring, Himmler, Milch, Stumpff, Wagner and Körner in Neustadt in Oberschlesien, during their visitation of the Sudetenland in 1938

In January 1933, Hitler became chancellor, and within a few months, dictator. The defence minister, General Werner von Blomberg, ensured that the Army remained loyal to the new regime. In February, he arranged for Hitler to meet with senior generals, including Rundstedt. Hitler assured the generals that he favoured a strong Army and that there would be no interference with its internal affairs. Rundstedt was satisfied with this, but made it clear in private conversations that he did not like the Nazi regime. He also said, however, that he would do nothing to oppose it. In 1934, when General Kurt von Hammerstein-Equord resigned as chief of staff, Hitler wished to appoint General Walter von Reichenau to succeed him. Rundstedt led a group of senior officers in opposing the appointment, on the grounds that Reichenau was too openly a supporter of the regime. Hitler and Blomberg backed down and General Werner von Fritsch was appointed instead. When Fritsch was forced to resign in 1938, Rundstedt again blocked Reichenau's appointment, and the post went to General Walther von Brauchitsch.

Like most of the Army, Rundstedt feared the growing power of the Sturmabteilung (SA) and was relieved when it was purged, although he and many others were angered that two generals, Schleicher and Ferdinand von Bredow, were killed. He was among the senior officers who later persuaded Hitler to have these two officers posthumously (but secretly) rehabilitated. Some sources also claim he was among those senior officers who demanded courts-martial for those responsible for the murders, although Rundstedt didn't testify to that at Nuremberg. The Army was uncomfortable with the purge, but Rundstedt and the rest of the Army still took the personal oath of loyalty to Hitler that Blomberg introduced. Rundstedt also supported the regime's plans for rearmament, culminating in the denunciation of the Treaty of Versailles in 1935, which was followed by the reintroduction of conscription. By 1935, when he turned 60, Rundstedt was the senior officer of the German Army in terms of service, and second only to Blomberg in rank. Recognising his status, Hitler cultivated him, appointing him as Germany's representative at the funeral of King George V in January 1936.

Given his prestige, Rundstedt was a central figure in the Blomberg–Fritsch Affair which engulfed the German Army in early 1938. This was a political manoeuvre by senior Nazis Hermann Göring and Heinrich Himmler to strengthen their positions within the Nazi regime at the expense of the military leadership. Together, they forced the resignation of both Blomberg and Fritsch, the former under threat of blackmail because of his second wife's dubious past, and the latter on fabricated charges of homosexuality. On 31 January, Rundstedt and the Army Chief of Staff, General Ludwig Beck, representing the officer corps, had an angry meeting with Hitler. Rundstedt agreed that Blomberg had disgraced himself and demanded that he be court-martialled, which Hitler refused. On the other hand, he defended Fritsch, correctly accusing Himmler of having fabricated the allegations against him. He insisted that Fritsch have the right to defend himself before a Court of Honour, which Hitler reluctantly agreed to. Beck promoted Rundstedt as Fritsch's successor, but Rundstedt declined, and the post went to Brauchitsch. At Beck's urging, Fritsch challenged Himmler to a duel, but Rundstedt (as senior officer of the Army) declined to pass on Fritsch's letter. (Note: Fritsch was eventually exonerated by a Court of Honour, but was not re-instated.)

During 1938 and 1939, Beck and other senior officers were hatching plots to remove Hitler from power if he provoked a new war with Britain and France over Czechoslovakia or Poland, a war they were convinced Germany would lose. Rundstedt was aware of these plots, and Beck tried to recruit him to the plotters' ranks, knowing of his disdain for the Nazi regime. But Rundstedt stuck firmly to his position that officers should not be involved in politics, no matter how grave the issues at stake. On the other hand, he did not report these approaches to Hitler or the Gestapo, then or later. From a purely military point of view, Rundstedt was apprehensive about Hitler's plans to attack Czechoslovakia, since he believed that Britain and France would intervene and Germany would be defeated. Brauchitsch lacked the courage to oppose Hitler directly, but agreed to Beck's request for a meeting of senior commanders. At the meeting, widespread opposition to Hitler's plans to coerce Czechoslovakia over the Sudetenland issue was expressed. Beck urged the officers to oppose Hitler's plans openly, but Rundstedt, while agreeing about the dangers of war before Germany was fully re-armed, would not support him, but declared himself unwilling to provoke a new crisis between Hitler and the Army. He advised Brauchitsch not to confront Hitler, apparently afraid that Brauchitsch would be dismissed and replaced by Reichenau. When Hitler heard about the meeting, Beck was forced to resign. Even after this, two of Rundstedt's friends, Generals Erwin von Witzleben and Erich Hoepner, remained involved in anti-Hitler plots and continued to try to recruit him.

In November 1938, shortly after his division had taken part in the bloodless occupation of the Sudetenland, Rundstedt retired from the Army with the rank of colonel-general (Generaloberst), second only to the rank of field marshal. It was suggested that Hitler had forced him out, either because of his opposition to the plan to invade Czechoslovakia or because of his support for Fritsch, but this seems not to be the case: he had in fact asked permission to retire some time earlier. Just short of his 63rd birthday, he was not in good health and missed his family – he was now a grandfather. Moreover, despite their recent confrontations, he remained on good terms with Hitler, who made him honorary colonel (Chef) of his old regiment on his retirement. Rundstedt also agreed that in the event of war, he would return to active service.

== World War II ==
=== Invasion of Poland ===
Rundstedt's retirement did not last long. By early 1939, Hitler had decided to force a confrontation with Poland over the Polish Corridor, and planning for a war with Poland began. In May, Hitler approved Rundstedt's appointment as commander of Army Group South, to invade Poland from Silesia and Slovakia. His chief of staff was General Erich von Manstein, his chief of operations Colonel Günther Blumentritt. His principal field commanders would be (from west to east as they entered Poland) General Johannes Blaskowitz (8th Army), General Walther von Reichenau (10th Army), and General Wilhelm List (14th Army).

Rundstedt's armies advanced rapidly into southern Poland, capturing Kraków on 6 September, but Reichenau's over-ambitious attempt to take Warsaw by storm on 9 September was repelled. Soon after, Blaskowitz's exposed northern flank was attacked by the Polish Poznań Army, leading to the major engagement of the Polish campaign, the Battle of the Bzura. Rundstedt and Manstein travelled to Blaskowitz's headquarters to take charge, and by 11 September the Poles had been contained in a pocket around Kutno. By 18 September, the Poznan Army had been destroyed, and Warsaw was besieged. Reichenau's forces took Lublin on 11 September, while List's army was advancing to the east towards Lvov, where they eventually linked up with Soviet forces advancing from the east under the terms of the Molotov–Ribbentrop Pact. Warsaw surrendered on 28 September, and by 6 October, fighting in southern Poland had ceased.

From the first days of the invasion, there had been incidents of German troops shooting Polish soldiers after they had surrendered, and killing civilians, especially Polish Jews. Some of these incidents were the work of units of the SS-Verfügungstruppe (SS-VT), forerunner of the Waffen-SS, but some involved regular Army units. Rundstedt's biographer says: "There is certainly no evidence that Rundstedt ever condoned, let alone encouraged, these acts." Rundstedt told Reichenau that such actions did not have his authorisation. In fact, both Rundstedt and Blaskowitz complained to the chief of staff, General Franz Halder, about the Army Command's apparent tolerance of such incidents. Nevertheless, as commander of Army Group South, Rundstedt was legally responsible for the behaviour of his troops, and these incidents later formed part of the charges of war crimes against him.

Behind the Army came SS Einsatzgruppen (task forces) commanded by Theodor Eicke, who began systematically executing Jews and members of the Polish educated classes. One Einsatzgruppe commanded by Udo von Woyrsch operated in 14th Army's area. At Dynów, Woyrsch's men herded the town's Jews into the synagogue and then burned it down. By 20 September, over 500 Jews had been killed. In 1939, this was too much for most German Army officers to stand. After complaints from numerous officers, Rundstedt banned Woyrsch's units from the area, but after his departure, his order was rescinded. On 20 October, Rundstedt resigned his command and was transferred to the western front. (Note: Fest says that Rundstedt "left his post in horror after a short period," but does not cite a source for this observation.)

=== Invasion of France and the Low Countries ===
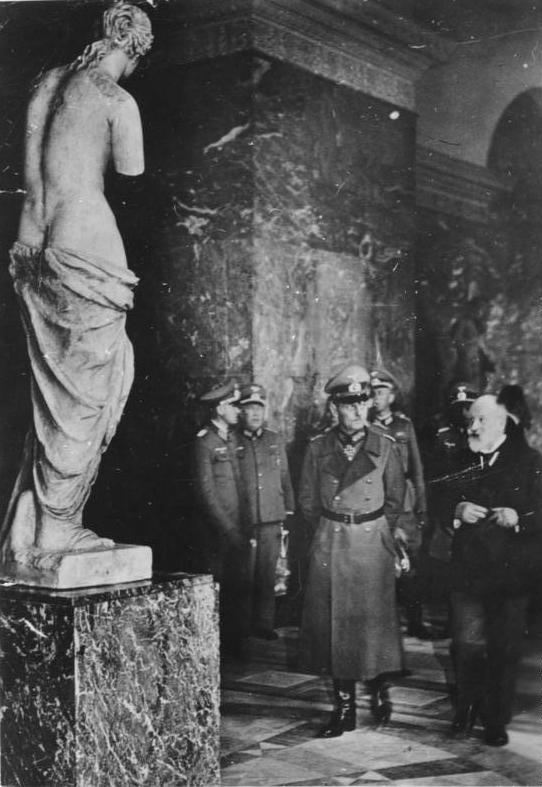
Rundstedt by Venus de Milo while touring The Louvre, occupied France, October 1940

On 25 October, Rundstedt took up his new post as commander of Army Group A, facing the French border in the Ardennes mountains sector, and based in Koblenz. To his north Army Group B under General Fedor von Bock faced the Dutch and Belgian borders, while to his south Army Group C under General Wilhelm Ritter von Leeb faced the French along the Maginot Line. Manstein was again his chief of staff and Blumentritt his chief of operations, although Manstein soon departed to command an infantry corps and was replaced by General Georg von Sodenstern. Rundstedt's main field commanders (from north to south) were Blaskowitz (9th Army), List (12th Army) and General Ernst Busch (16th Army).

Hitler's original plan was to attack in late November, before the French and British had time to fully deploy along their front. The plan, devised by Hitler, was essentially for a re-run of the invasion of 1914, with the main assault to come in the north, through Belgium and the Netherlands, then wheeling south to capture Paris, leaving the French Army anchored on the Maginot Line. Most senior officers were opposed to both the timing and the plan. Rundstedt, Manstein, Reichenau (commanding 6th Army in Army Group B), List and Brauchitsch remonstrated with Hitler in a series of meetings in October and November. They were opposed to an offensive so close to the onset of winter, and they were opposed to launching the main attack through Belgium, where the many rivers and canals would hamper armoured operations. Manstein, in particular, supported by Rundstedt, argued for an armoured assault by Army Group A across the Ardennes to the sea, cutting the British and French off in Belgium. This "Manstein Plan" was the genesis of the blitzkrieg of May 1940.

A combination of bad weather, the arguments of his generals, and a breach of security when the details of the original plan fell into Allied hands eventually led Hitler to agree to postpone the attack until early 1940, when it was again delayed by the invasion of Denmark and Norway. In February, Hitler finally accepted the Manstein Plan. General Günther von Kluge's 4th Army and General Maximilian Reichsfreiherr von Weichs's 2nd Army were transferred from Army Group B to Rundstedt's command. General Ewald von Kleist was now to command Panzer (Armoured) Group Kleist, consisting of three armoured corps, led by Heinz Guderian, Georg-Hans Reinhardt and Gustav Anton von Wietersheim. These armoured corps were to be the spearhead of the German thrust into France. Although Manstein is often credited for the change of plans, he himself acknowledged Rundstedt's decisive role. "I would stress that my commander, Colonel-General von Rundstedt, agreed with my view throughout, and backed our recommendations to the full. Without his sanction, we could never have kept up our attempts to change OKW's mind."

During this hiatus, the group of senior officers who were plotting against Hitler's war plans, led by Halder, renewed their efforts, convinced that an attack in the west would lead to a war which Germany would lose. Brauchitsch agreed with Halder's fears, but continued to vacillate about opposing Hitler – he asked Reichenau and Rundstedt to remonstrate with Hitler, but they refused. Witzleben suggested that Rundstedt, Leeb and Bock should jointly refuse to carry out Hitler's orders to carry out the attack. Two of the conspirators, Abwehr officers Hans Oster and Hans Bernd Gisevius, discussed this with Leeb, who turned them down but did not report them. On 13 March, Himmler came to Koblenz to give the generals, including Rundstedt, an ideological lecture, in the course of which he made it clear that the atrocities against civilians which some of them had witnessed in Poland had been carried out on his orders, and with the approval of Hitler. "I do nothing that the Führer does not know", he said.

The attack was finally launched on 10 May. By 14 May, armoured units under Hermann Hoth and Guderian had crossed the Meuse and had broken open the Allied front. As planned, the British and French had advanced into Belgium to meet Bock's offensive, and were in danger of being cut off there by a German thrust to the sea. Both Hitler and Rundstedt had doubts about the safety of allowing the armoured corps to get too far ahead of their infantry support, however. Hitler sent the chief of staff of the Armed Forces Supreme Command (Oberkommando der Wehrmacht, OKW), General Wilhelm Keitel, to Rundstedt's headquarters to urge caution. In Halder's words, Hitler was "frightened by his own success [...] afraid to take any chance." Guderian objected vehemently to being ordered to halt, and Rundstedt was forced to mediate between Hitler and his impetuous armoured commanders, who were backed by Halder. By 20 May, Guderian's tanks had reached the sea to the west of Abbeville and closed the trap on the British and French, who were already in retreat to the English Channel ports.

By this time, however, Kleist's armoured forces were thinly stretched and had suffered losses of up to 50% of their tanks. Kleist asked Rundstedt for a pause while the armoured units recovered and the infantry caught up, and Rundstedt agreed to this. At the same time, Göring attempted to persuade Hitler that the Luftwaffe could destroy the trapped Allied armies, freeing the German forces to turn south towards Paris. Hitler accepted this view, and on 24 May issued what became known as the Halt Order, preventing the German armour from rapidly capturing Calais and Dunkirk. The Luftwaffe were unable to destroy the Allied armies, however, and the halt allowed the British Expeditionary Force and many French troops to be evacuated from Dunkirk. This decision, for which Hitler, Rundstedt and Kleist shared responsibility, proved very costly to Germany's war effort in the long term. After the war, Rundstedt described the Halt Order as "an incredible blunder" and assigned full blame to Hitler. His biographer concedes that this "does not represent the whole truth", because the original impetus for a pause came from Kleist and Rundstedt himself.

Attention then turned to the attack on the French armies to the south. On 29 May, Hitler came to Rundstedt's headquarters at Charleville-Mézières to discuss the new offensive. Bock's Army Group B on the right was to advance on Paris, while Rundstedt's Army Group A, now consisting only of List's 12th Army, Weichs's 2nd Army and Busch's 16th Army, was to attack towards Soissons and Rheims. Rundstedt's attack began on 9 June and within a few days had broken the French resistance. By 12 June, his forces were across the Marne and advancing south-east towards Alsace. Dijon fell on 16 June and Lyon on 20 June. By this time, French resistance was crumbling and on 22 June, the French requested an armistice. In July, Hitler announced that Rundstedt and a number of other field commanders were to be promoted to the rank of Field Marshal (Generalfeldmarschall) during the 1940 Field Marshal Ceremony. Although Rundstedt wished to resume his retirement, he was persuaded by Hitler to stay in France and set up headquarters at Saint-Germain-en-Laye about 20 km (12 mi) outside Paris. There he oversaw the planning for the proposed invasion of Britain, Operation Sea Lion, but never took the prospects for this operation seriously, and was not surprised when Hitler called it off in September after the Luftwaffe's setback in the Battle of Britain. Even then, Rundstedt was not to be allowed to retire, when in October Hitler appointed him Commander-in-Chief West (Oberbefehlshaber West, or OB West).

=== Planning the war against the Soviet Union ===
By July 1940, Hitler was turning his mind to the invasion of the Soviet Union, commissioning General Erich Marcks to prepare preliminary plans. Although the Hitler-Stalin pact had served Germany's interests well, both strategically and economically, his whole career had been based on anti-communism and the belief that "Jewish Bolshevism" was the main threat to Germany and the Aryan race. In December, Hitler made a firm decision for an attack on the Soviets the following spring, codenamed Operation Barbarossa. At this point, Rundstedt learned that he was to give up his quiet life in occupied France and assume command of Army Group South, tasked with the conquest of Ukraine. Leeb would command in the north, heading for Leningrad, and Bock in the centre, charged with capturing Moscow. On the way, the three army groups were to encircle and destroy the Red Army before it could retreat into the Russian interior.

Rundstedt, like most German officers, had favoured the policy of good relations with the Soviets followed by the Reichswehr commander General Hans von Seekt during the Weimar Republic years, when the Soviet connection was seen as a counter to the threat from Poland. He was also apprehensive about launching a new war in the east while Britain was undefeated. If so, he did nothing to oppose them, and in this he was in company even with officers who disliked and opposed Hitler's regime, such as Halder, who threw themselves into planning the invasion, and believed it would succeed. Even the most experienced officers shared Hitler's contempt for the Soviet state and army. "You have only to kick in the door," Hitler told Rundstedt, "and the whole rotten structure will come crashing down."

In March, Rundstedt left Paris to set up Army Group South's headquarters in Breslau. On the way, he attended a conference in Berlin at which Hitler addressed senior officers. He made it clear that the ordinary rules of warfare would not apply to the Russian campaign. "This is a war of extermination", he told them. "We do not wage war to preserve the enemy." (Note: This quotation is a paraphrase of Hitler's actual words, as recorded in General Halder's diary.) This gave the generals a clear warning that they would be expected not to obstruct Hitler's wider war aims in the east – the extermination of the Jews and the reduction of the Slavic peoples to serfdom under a new Herrenvolk (Master race) of German settlers. As part of this strategy, the Commissar Order was issued, which stated that all Red Army commissars were to be executed when captured. Rundstedt testified at Nuremberg about the attitude of the Army to this Order: "Our attitude was unanimously and absolutely against it. Immediately after the conference, we approached Brauchitsch and told him that this was impossible [...] The order was simply not carried out." This latter statement was clearly untrue, as the Commissar Order was widely carried out. But whether Rundstedt knew this was another matter, and this question was later to figure prominently in the issue of whether to charge him with war crimes.

Barbarossa was initially scheduled for May, at the beginning of the Russian spring, but was postponed until June because unseasonably wet weather made the roads impassable for armour (not because of the German invasion of Yugoslavia and Greece in April, as is commonly supposed). Rundstedt moved his headquarters to Tarnów in south-eastern Poland. Since the dividing line between Army Group Centre and Army Group South was just south of Brest-Litovsk, he was in command of more than half of the total German-Soviet front. Sodenstern was again his chief of staff. Under his command were (from north to south) Reichenau (6th Army), Kleist (1st Panzer Army) and General Carl-Heinrich von Stülpnagel (17th Army). These three armies, bunched between Lublin and the Carpathians, were to thrust south-eastwards into Ukraine, aiming to capture Kiev and encircle and destroy the Soviet forces west of the Dnieper. In the south, General Eugen Ritter von Schobert (11th Army), supported by the Hungarian and Romanian armies, and also an Italian Army Corps, was to advance into Bessarabia (now Moldova) and southern Ukraine. It's unlikely that Rundstedt thought a decisive victory was possible at this point; while saying farewell to the commander of Army Group North in early May, he remarked: "See you again in Siberia."

=== Operation Barbarossa ===
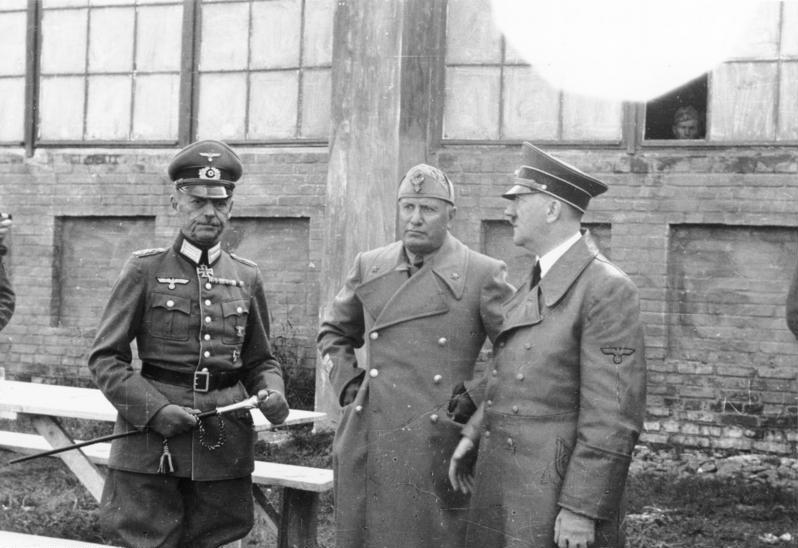
Rundstedt, Benito Mussolini, and Adolf Hitler, Russia, 1941

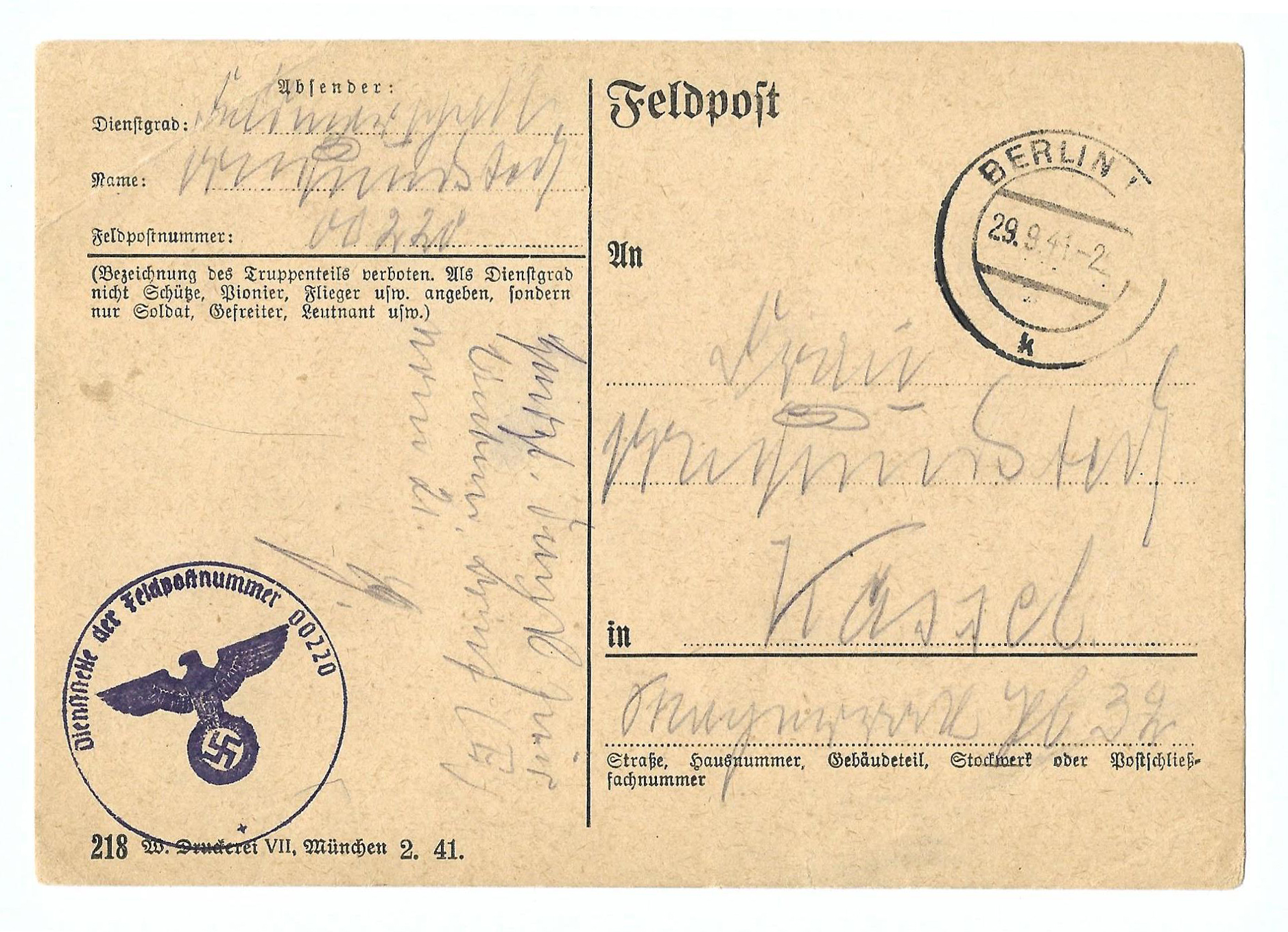
1941 pencil postcard sent from Gerd von Rundstedt to his wife from the Front.

The attack began on 22 June. Despite ample warning from intelligence sources and defectors, Joseph Stalin and the Soviet Command were caught by surprise, and the Germans rapidly broke through the frontier defences, helped by their total command of the air. But the Soviet commander in northern Ukraine, Colonel-General Mikhail Kirponos, was one of the better Soviet generals, and he commanded the Red Army's largest and best-equipped force: nearly a million men and 4,800 tanks. The Germans soon encountered stubborn resistance. Rundstedt testified at Nuremberg: "The resistance at the frontier was not too great, but it grew continually as we advanced into the interior of the country. Very strong tank forces, tanks of a better type, far superior to ours, appeared." The Soviet tank armies were in fact stronger than the German panzer divisions, and in the T-34 they possessed a superior tank: Kleist called it "the finest tank in the world." Rundstedt said after the war: "I realised soon after the attack that everything that had been written about Russia was wrong." But at this stage of the war, the Red Army tank commanders lacked the tactical skill and experience of the German panzer commanders, and after ten days of bitter fighting, Kleist's armour broke through, reaching Zhytomyr, only 130 km from Kiev, on 12 July. By 30 July, the Red Army in Ukraine was in full retreat. Rundstedt and his commanders were confident that they could seize Kiev "off the march," that is, without a prolonged siege.

Despite these successes, the campaign did not go according to plan. The front door was "kicked in", but the Red Army was not destroyed, and the Soviet state did not collapse. Once this became apparent, at the end of July, Hitler and his commanders had to decide how to proceed. Hitler ordered Army Group Centre to pause at Smolensk, while the panzer divisions were shipped to the north and the south. (Note: Military historian B. H. Liddell Hart's views were based on extensive interviews with former German Army commanders, notably Rundstedt, with whom he developed a close relationship.)

Although Rundstedt opposed this diversion of forces, he was its beneficiary as attention was shifted to the southern front. He also benefited from disastrous decisions made by the Soviets. On 10 July, Stalin appointed his old crony Marshal Semyon Budyonny commander in Ukraine, with orders to stop the German advance at all costs. Budyonny ordered Kirponos to push his forces forward to Kiev and Uman, despite the danger of encirclement, rather than withdraw and make a stand on the Dnieper. Rundstedt therefore decided to break off the advance towards Kiev, and to direct Kleist's armour south-eastwards, towards Krivoy Rog. By 30 July, the Germans were at Kirovograd, 130 km east of Uman, cutting off the Soviet line of retreat (which had in any case been forbidden by Stalin). Meanwhile, Schobert's 11th Army was advancing north-eastwards from Bessarabia. On 2 August, the two armies met, trapping over 100,000 Soviet troops, virtually all of whom were killed or captured. Southern Ukraine was thus left virtually defenceless, and by 25 August, when they entered Dnipropetrovsk, the Germans had occupied everything west of the Dnieper (except Odesa, which held out until October). Nevertheless, this had all taken longer than expected, and the Red Army was showing no signs of collapse. Rundstedt wrote to his wife on 12 August: "How much longer? I have no great hope that it will be soon. The distances in Russia devour us." (Note: Rundstedt was actually in Ukraine, not Russia, but like most Germans of this period, he drew no distinction.)

Neither the success at Uman nor what followed at Kiev would have happened had Rundstedt not backed his subordinates and resisted Hitler's interference in the conduct of the campaign. As during the French campaign, Hitler was panicked by his own success. By early July, he was full of anxiety that the German armour was advancing too quickly, without infantry support, and that it was exposed to Soviet counter-attacks. On 10 July, Brauchitsch arrived at Rundstedt's headquarters at Brody, with instructions from Hitler that Kleist was to turn south towards Vinnitsa and link up with Schobert's army there, rather than continue south-east to Kirovograd. This would still have trapped many Soviet divisions, but it would have allowed the mass of Soviet forces at Uman and Kiev to escape. Rundstedt defended Kleist's ability to execute the larger encirclement and persuaded Brauchitsch that he was right. Brauchitsch then contacted Halder, who succeeded in persuading Hitler to support Rundstedt. This was a sign that Rundstedt still had Hitler's respect, as were Hitler's two visits to Rundstedt's armies during this period.

After Uman Budyonny's forces massed around Kiev – over 700,000 men – were left dangerously exposed, with Kleist's 1st Panzer Army regrouping to the south-east and General Heinz Guderian's 2nd Panzer Army (part of Army Group Centre) smashing General Yeromenko's Briansk Front and advancing south from Gomel in White Russia, on a line well east of Kiev. The danger of encirclement was obvious, but Stalin stubbornly refused to consider withdrawal, despite warnings from both Budyonny and Kirponos that catastrophe was imminent. Budyonny has been freely blamed by postwar writers for the disaster at Kiev, but it is clear that while he was out of his depth as a front commander, he warned Stalin of the danger and was dismissed for his pains. On 12 September, Kleist crossed the Dnieper at Cherkasy heading north-east, and on 16 September his tanks linked up with Guderian's at Lokhvitsa, nearly 200 km east of Kiev. Although many Soviet troops were able to escape eastwards in small groups, around 600,000 men – four whole armies comprising 43 divisions, nearly one-third of the Soviet Army's strength at the start of the war – were killed or captured, and the great majority of those captured died in captivity. Kiev fell on 19 September. Kirponos was killed in action on 20 September, shortly before resistance ceased.

Rundstedt had thus presided over one of the greatest victories in the history of warfare. But this catastrophe for the Red Army resulted far more from the inflexibility of Stalin than it did from the talents of Rundstedt as a commander or the skill of the German Army. David Stahel, a recent historian of the Kiev campaign, wrote: "Germany had been handed a triumph far in excess of what its exhausted armoured forces could have achieved without Stalin's obduracy and incompetence." In fact, both the German Army and the Red Army were driven more by the dictates of their respective political masters than by the decisions of the military professionals. Stahel sums the situation up with his chapter heading: "Subordinating the generals: the dictators dictate." Kirponos could have withdrawn most of his army across the Dnieper in time had Stalin allowed him to do so, and Rundstedt himself acknowledged this. Had this happened, Rundstedt's forces would have been in no state to give chase: they were exhausted after two months of ceaseless combat. Despite their successes, they had sustained high levels of casualties and even higher levels of loss of equipment, both of which were impossible to replace. By September, the German Army in the Soviet Union had suffered nearly 500,000 casualties. (Note: The Soviets had suffered many more, but they had a larger population to recruit from, and could train new recruits quicker and more cheaply.) In a statement to the Army on 15 August, Rundstedt acknowledged: "It is only natural that such great effort would result in fatigue, the combat strength of the troops has weakened and in many places there is a desire for rest." But, said Rundstedt, "We must keep pressure on the enemy for he has many more reserves than we." This was a remarkable admission so early in the Russian campaign, and it showed that Rundstedt was already well aware of how unrealistic the German belief in a quick victory had been.

Despite the monumental efforts and initial successes of Operation Barbarossa, by late 1941, the German advance began to falter significantly. Rundstedt's forces, along with the rest of the Wehrmacht, faced an increasingly dire situation as they pushed deeper into Soviet territory. The logistical nightmare became more pronounced, with supply lines overextended and insufficient resources to maintain the pace of the advance. The harsh Russian winter arrived earlier than expected, bringing with it temperatures that plummeted to unprecedented lows, wreaking havoc on both men and machinery. German troops, unprepared for such extreme conditions, suffered from frostbite and hypothermia, severely impacting their combat effectiveness. Equipment and vehicles, not designed for sub-zero temperatures, frequently malfunctioned or were rendered inoperable. The Red Army, though battered, began to regroup and launch counteroffensives, exploiting the Germans' weakened state. Rundstedt, aware of the grim reality, acknowledged the growing resilience and capability of the Soviet forces. The campaign that was envisioned as a quick, decisive victory was now evolving into a drawn-out war of attrition, with the Germans struggling to maintain their foothold against a resurgent and determined enemy. This shift marked the beginning of a protracted and brutal conflict that would eventually drain the German war effort and contribute to the ultimate downfall of the Third Reich.

=== Dismissal ===
Despite the triumph at Kiev, by the end of September, Rundstedt was becoming concerned about the state of his command. After three months of continuous fighting, the German armies were exhausted, and the Panzer divisions were in urgent need of new equipment as a result of losses in battle and damage from the poorly paved Ukrainian roads. As autumn set in, the weather deteriorated, making the situation worse. Rundstedt wanted to halt on the Dnieper for the winter, which would allow the German Army time to rest and be re-equipped. But the German armies could not rest, for fear the Soviet southern armies (now commanded by the stubborn Marshal Semyon Timoshenko) would regroup and consolidate a front on the Donets or the Don. So, soon after the fall of Kiev, the offensive was resumed. Reichenau advanced east towards Kharkov and Kleist and Stülpnagel headed south-east towards the lower Donets. In the south, the 11th Army and the Romanians (commanded by Manstein following the death of Schobert) advanced along the Sea of Azov coast towards Rostov.

The Soviet armies were in a poor state after the catastrophes of Uman and Kiev, and could offer only sporadic resistance, but the German advance was slowed by the autumn rains and the Soviet scorched earth policy, which denied the Germans food and fuel and forced them to rely on overstretched lines of supply. Rundstedt's armies were also weakened by the transfer of units back to Army Group Centre to take part in the attack on Moscow (Operation Typhoon). Reichenau did not take Kharkov until 24 October. Nevertheless, during October, Rundstedt's forces won another great victory when Manstein and Kleist's tanks reached the Sea of Azov, trapping two Soviet Armies around Mariupol and taking over 100,000 prisoners. This victory enabled Manstein to undertake the conquest of the Crimea (apart from the fortress city of Sevastopol) against only weak opposition, while Kleist advanced towards Rostov. Despite these defeats, the Red Army was able to fall back on the Don in reasonably good order, and also to evacuate many of the industrial plants of the Donbass.

On 3 November, Brauchitsch visited Rundstedt's headquarters at Poltava, where Rundstedt told him that the armies must halt and dig in for the winter. But Hitler drove his commanders on, insisting on an advance to the Volga and into the North Caucasus, to seize the oilfields at Maikop. These demands put Rundstedt under severe strain. The Germans were more than 300 km from Maikop and 500 km from the Volga at Stalingrad. On the other hand, they were over 1,000 km from their starting point in eastern Poland, and even further from their supply bases in Germany. The Russian winter set in with full force in mid-November. The Germans were short of food, fuel, ammunition, vehicles, spare parts and winter clothing. Partisan activity was growing in their rear areas, threatening their supplies. Rundstedt was now 65 and not in good health – he was a heavy smoker, and in October in Poltava he suffered a mild heart attack. He increasingly resorted to drinking to cope with the strain. He was now in the position of having to launch a new offensive against his better judgement, with exhausted troops in very adverse conditions. This was a recipe for defeat, but Rundstedt obeyed Hitler's orders.

Kleist, his units reinforced by Waffen-SS General Sepp Dietrich's 1st SS Division (the Leibstandarte Adolf Hitler), attacked on 17 November, and captured Rostov on the 21st. But the Soviets had had time to prepare, and launched a counter-offensive on the 25th. On the 28th, Rundstedt authorised Kleist to withdraw from Rostov and establish a front on the Mius, 70 km to the west. When Hitler heard of this the next day, he ordered that Rostov should be held, although it had in fact already been evacuated. Rundstedt replied by insisting on his decision, and adding: "Should confidence in my leadership no longer exist, I beg to request someone be substituted who enjoys the necessary confidence of the Supreme Command." Hitler took Rundstedt at his word, and on 1 December he dismissed him, replacing him with Reichenau. (Note: Mawdsley says that Rundstedt resigned, but this is incorrect. Rundstedt's letter was not a resignation, but an invitation to Hitler to dismiss him if he had lost confidence in him.) The new commander saw at once that Rundstedt was right, and succeeded in persuading Hitler, via Franz Halder, to authorise the withdrawal. This was the first significant defeat the German Army suffered in World War II, and Rundstedt was the first senior commander to be dismissed.

Hitler, however, immediately realised that he had gone too far in arbitrarily sacking the most senior commander of the German Army. He arrived in Poltava on 3 December, where he found both Reichenau and Sepp Dietrich firm in defending the correctness of Rundstedt's actions. Sodenstern explained the full circumstances of the retreat from Rostov to Hitler, an explanation which Hitler grudgingly accepted. Hitler then met with Rundstedt and excused himself on the grounds that it had all been a misunderstanding. He suggested that Rundstedt take a period of leave, "and then once more place your incomparable services at my disposal." On 5 December, his honour restored, Rundstedt left Poltava, never to return to the Russian front.

Shortly after his return to Kassel, on his 66th birthday, Rundstedt received a cheque from Hitler for 250,000 Reichsmarks. (Note: Testimony of Dr Hans Lammers, head of Hitler's chancellery, at the Nuremberg trials. Lammers administered the system of bonuses, which was, as he said, a system dating back to Frederick the Great. He said Rundstedt was also given an estate near Breslau in Silesia, but no other source mentions this.) This was part of Hitler's policy of buying the continuing loyalty of his senior commanders. Many found this offensive, but none turned down these gifts. Rundstedt tried to do the next best thing by failing to cash the cheque. By February, this was attracting adverse comment in Berlin, and Rundstedt then cashed it. Some writers have sought to connect Rundstedt's acceptance of this money with his continuing refusal to support the resistance movement against Hitler's regime within the German Army. In fact, Rundstedt refused to have anything to do with the money, handing it over to his daughter-in-law, and it was still untouched at his death in 1953. (Note: The Rundstedt family did not access the money, by then considerably devalued, until 1982.)

=== War crimes in the East ===
In April 1941, during the planning phase of Barbarossa, Himmler and Brauchitsch had agreed that as the Army conquered Soviet territory, it would be handed over at once to the SS and the German Police, now fused under Himmler's leadership in the HSSPF (Higher SS and Police Leadership). Himmler set up four Einsatzgruppen under the overall command of Reinhard Heydrich. In Rundstedt's area of command, Einsatzgruppe C, commanded by Otto Rasch, operated in northern Ukraine, and Einsatzgruppe D, commanded by Otto Ohlendorf, operated in southern Ukraine.

The Einsatzgruppen were initially ordered to establish "security" in the rear areas by killing communists and partisans, but by 1941, the identity between Jews and communism was strongly established in the minds of most SS men and Police officers. In July, Himmler told an SS gathering: "This nation [Russia] has been united by the Jews in a religion, a world-view, called Bolshevism." From the beginning, therefore, the Einsatzgruppen mostly killed Jews: initially only adult males, but after a few months indiscriminately. By December 1941, when Rundstedt was dismissed as commander of Army Group South, Einsatzgruppen C and D had killed between 100,000 and 150,000 people. In addition, various units participated in killing 33,000 Kiev Jews at Babi Yar in September 1941, only days after the city was occupied by the Army.

The Army did participate directly in these mass killings: officers of Reichenau's 6th Army took part in organising the massacre at Babi Yar. On 10 October he issued an order (known as the "Reichenau Order") headed Conduct of the Troops in the East, in which he said: "The primary goal of the campaign against the Jewish-Bolshevist system is the absolute destruction of the means of power and the eradication of the Asian influence in the European cultural sphere [...] Therefore, the soldier must have a full understanding of the necessity of hard but just atonement of Jewish subhumanity [Untermenschentum]." (Note: Heer & Naumann extensively document the involvement of 6th Army in massacres of Jews and others.) Two days later, Rundstedt circulated it to all his senior commanders, with the comment: "I thoroughly concur with its contents." He urged them to release their own versions and to impress upon their troops the need to exterminate the Jews.

Since Reichenau's order was widely understood as endorsing the mass killings of Ukrainian Jews, which were going on behind the German lines, with which the 6th Army at any rate was actively co-operating, Rundstedt's open endorsement of its strongly anti-Semitic language clearly contradicts his later assertions that he did not know what the Einsatzgruppen were doing. He told interrogators in 1946 that he was aware of just one atrocity, at Berdichev on 30 July. At Nuremberg, he sought to portray the issue in terms of anti-partisan warfare: "Disorderly, irregular warfare behind the front of the Army must bring very great misery to the population of the country affected. No army in the world can tolerate such conditions for any length of time, but in the interests of the security and protection of its own troops, it must take sharp, energetic measures. But this should, of course, be done in a correct and soldierly manner." Rundstedt shared the general German Army prejudice against the Ostjuden (Eastern Jews) found in the Soviet Union. He described Zamość as "a dirty Jewish hole."

In September 1941, Rundstedt issued an order that soldiers were not to participate in or take photos of "Jewish operations", indicating awareness of their existence. The killings took place with the knowledge and support of the German Army in the east.

Under Rundstedt's command, Army Group South actively participated in the policies outlined in the Hunger Plan, the Nazi racial starvation policy, by "living off the land" and denying food supplies to Soviet prisoners of war and civilians. German troops "plundered huge quantities of livestock, grain and dairy produce", enough to feed themselves and to create substantial reserves for the Reich. However, due to transportation problems, the supplies could not be shipped to Germany and much of them spoiled during the winter of 1941/1942. As a consequence, mass starvation set in within urban areas, especially in Kiev and Kharkov.

=== Command in the West ===
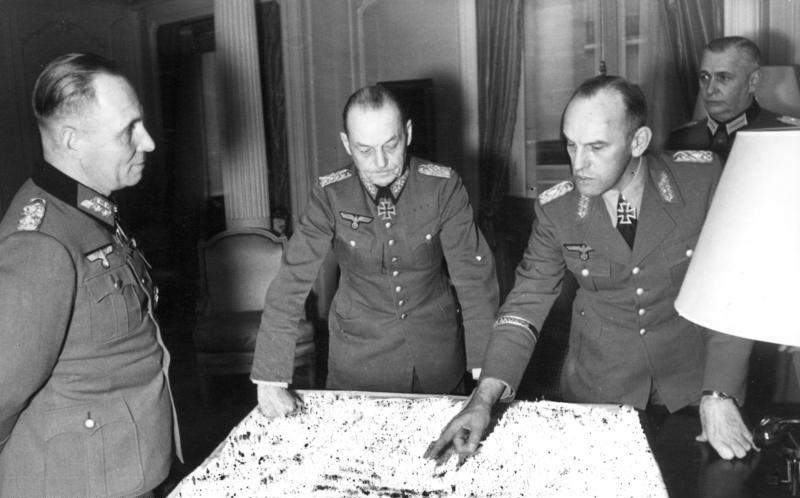
Rundstedt in the centre, with Erwin Rommel (left), Alfred Gause (right) and Bodo Zimmermann (in background)

In March 1942, Hitler re-appointed Rundstedt as OB West, in succession to Witzleben, who was ill. He returned to the comfortable headquarters in the Hotel Pavillon Henri IV in Saint-Germain, which he had occupied in 1940–41. Rundstedt's command of French and his good relationship with the head of the collaborationist Vichy regime, Marshal Philippe Pétain, were considerable assets. But his position was to grow increasingly difficult. Hitler did not intend to give him real authority, seeing him as a dignified figurehead. (Note: "But now he was to be little more than a figurehead, a role which he accepted because his sense of patriotic duty outweighed his professional pride.") Although he was commander of the German Army in the west, charged with defending the coasts of France and Belgium against attack by the western Allies, the military governors in Paris and Brussels (Rundstedt's former subordinate Carl-Heinrich von Stülpnagel and Alexander von Falkenhausen respectively) were not under his direct command, and he had no control over the Navy or Air Force. He also had no control over the SS and Gestapo operations in France: the HSSPF in Paris, Carl Oberg, answered only to Himmler.

Secondly, the internal situation in France had changed greatly since Rundstedt's departure in March 1941. Hitler's attack on the Soviet Union had led the French Communist Party to abandon its previous neutrality (its slogan was "Neither Pétain nor de Gaulle"), and launch active resistance against the Germans and the Vichy regime. The result was an escalating cycle of assassinations and reprisal killings that rapidly alienated the hitherto quiescent French population. On 20 October, French Communists assassinated the German commander in Nantes, Karl Hotz, triggering the execution of over 100 French hostages. As military governor, Stülpnagel directed the policy of executing hostages. Rundstedt had no direct control over the Army's response to Resistance attacks. Nevertheless, many held him responsible, then and later.

Rundstedt had more direct responsibility for the Commando Order of 1942, which later served as the basis of war crimes charges against him. There were, in fact, two German orders concerning captured Allied commandos. The first was issued by Rundstedt in July 1942, and stated that captured Allied parachutists were to be handed over to the Gestapo, whether in uniform or not, rather than made prisoners of war. This was a response to the increasing number of British agents being parachuted into France by the Special Operations Executive. The second was issued by Hitler personally in October, following the Dieppe Raid by the British and Canadians on the coast of France. It stipulated that all captured Allied commandos were to be executed, again regardless of whether they were in uniform. As a consequence, six British commandos captured in Operation Frankton, a raid on shipping at Bordeaux in December 1942, were executed by the German Navy. Although Rundstedt neither ordered nor was informed of this action, he was later held responsible as German commander in France.

Meanwhile, the military situation for the Germans was deteriorating. The entry of the United States into the war in December 1941 raised the likelihood of an Allied invasion of France. Hitler's response was to order the construction of the Atlantic Wall, a system of coastal fortifications from Norway to the French-Spanish border, to be constructed by the Organisation Todt using slave labour. There was also a steady build-up of German forces in France, despite the demands of the eastern front. By June, Rundstedt commanded 25 divisions. In November 1942 the Allies invaded French North Africa (Operation Torch). When the Vichy authorities in Africa surrendered after token resistance, the Germans responded by occupying all of France and dissolving what remained of the French Army. Rundstedt travelled to Vichy to placate Pétain, who threatened to resign but backed down after soothing words from Rundstedt. At the same time, in the Soviet Union, Rundstedt's old command, Army Group South, was facing disaster at Stalingrad, the turning point of World War II in Europe.

The catastrophe of Stalingrad prompted renewed efforts by dissident German officers to remove Hitler from power while there was still time, as they believed, to negotiate an honourable peace settlement. The conspirators were centred on Halder, Beck and Witzleben, but by 1943, all had been removed from positions of authority. The real movers were now more junior officers: Henning von Tresckow, chief of staff of Army Group Centre, Friedrich Olbricht, chief of the Armed Forces Replacement Office, and Claus Schenk Graf von Stauffenberg, a member of the Replacement Army staff. Their strategy at this time was to persuade the senior field commanders to lead a coup against Hitler. Their initial target was Manstein, now commanding Army Group Don, but he turned Tresckow down at a meeting in March 1943. Several sources say that Rundstedt was also approached, although they do not say specifically who approached him. (Note: Messenger says that he was approached by Gerhard Engel, one of Hitler's adjutants, urging him to approach Hitler about the military situation, but Engel was not a member of the anti-Hitler conspiracy. Fest refers to "the officer sent by Groscurth (the Abwehr officer Helmuth Groscurth) to Rundstedt", but does not name him. In Stauffenberg, Hoffmann refers to "efforts made to persuade" Rundstedt, but does not say who made them. The approaches were probably made through Rundstedt's aide-de-camp, Hans-Viktor von Salviati, who was later executed for his role in the anti-Hitler plot.) In any case, he refused to get involved, although both Stülpnagel and Falkenhausen were recruits to the conspiracy. By one account, he complained: "Why always me? Let Manstein and Kluge do it." He told Gerhard Engel, one of Hitler's adjutants, that he was "too old and had had enough."

It was true that Rundstedt was well past his best. The military historian Chester Wilmot wrote soon after the war: "The truth was that Rundstedt had lost his grip. He was old and tired and his once active brain was gradually becoming addled, for he had great difficulty in sleeping without the soporific aid of alcohol." Events in June 1944 showed that this was an exaggeration: Rundstedt was still capable of clear thought and decisive action. But his health was a matter of increasing concern to his staff and his family. His son Leutnant Hans-Gerd von Rundstedt was posted to his command as an aide-de-camp, partly to monitor his health and report back to Bila in Kassel. In one of his letters, Hans-Gerd referred to his father's "somewhat plentiful nicotine and alcohol consumption," but assured his mother that Rundstedt's health was basically sound. Nevertheless, in May 1943, Rundstedt was given leave and was sent to a sanatorium at Bad Tölz, south of Munich, which was also the site of an SS-Junker school. Later, he stayed some time at Grundlsee in Austria, and was received by Hitler at his summer house at Berchtesgaden, a sign of Hitler's continuing respect for him. He was back at work by July.

=== Defeat in Normandy ===
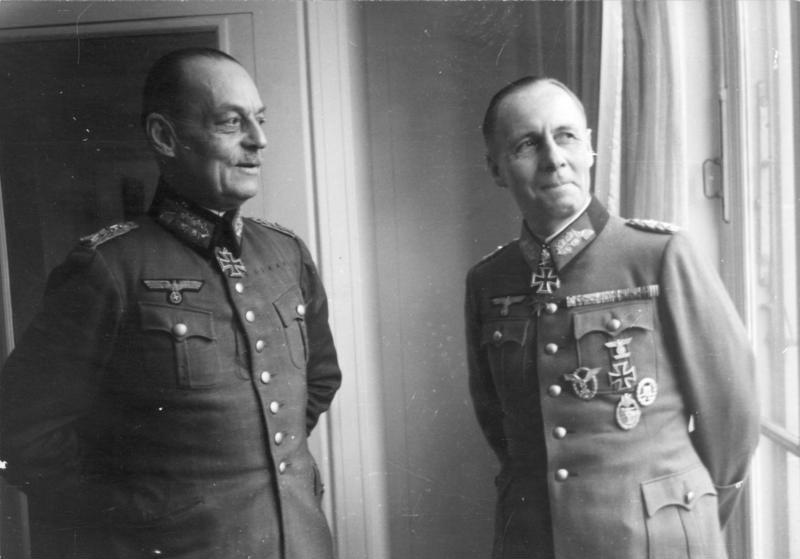
With Erwin Rommel, December 1943

The Allied invasion of Italy in September 1943 removed Rundstedt's fears that France would be invaded that summer, but he could not have doubted that the massive build-up of American troops in Britain meant that a cross-channel invasion would come in 1944. In October, Rundstedt sent Hitler a memorandum on the defensive preparations. He placed no faith in the Atlantic Wall, seeing it merely as useful propaganda. He said: "We Germans do not indulge in the tired Maginot spirit." He argued that an invasion could only be defeated by a defence in depth, with armoured reserves positioned well inland so that they could be deployed wherever the invasion came, and launch counter-offensives to drive the invaders back. There were several problems with this, particularly the lack of fuel for rapid movements of armour, the Allied air superiority, which enabled them to disrupt the transport system, and the increasingly effective sabotage efforts of the French resistance. Hitler was not persuaded: his view was that the invasion must be defeated on the beaches. Characteristically, however, he told Rundstedt he agreed with him, then sent Field Marshal Erwin Rommel to France with orders to hasten the completion of the Atlantic Wall; while Rundstedt remained the commander in France, Rommel became the official commander of Army Group B. Rundstedt was extremely angered by this decision; although he admired Rommel's tactical skill, he knew from his colleagues that Rommel was notoriously difficult to work with and would mostly be able to ignore Rundstedt's authority thanks to his patronage by Hitler and Goebbels. Rommel, in fact, agreed with Rundstedt that the Atlantic Wall was a "gigantic bluff", but he also believed that Allied air power made Rundstedt's proposed defence plan impossible; like Hitler, he believed the invasion could only be stopped on the beach itself.

By the spring of 1944, Rommel had turned the mostly nonexistent "Wall" into a formidable defensive line, but since he believed the invasion would come somewhere between Dunkirk and the mouth of the Somme, much of his work was directed at strengthening the wrong area, although in late 1943 he had focused on Normandy. As fears of an imminent invasion mounted, conflict broke out among the commanders. Rommel wanted the armoured divisions positioned close to the coast, mostly in the area he considered at highest risk. The commander of armoured forces in France, General Leo Geyr von Schweppenburg, backed by Rundstedt, strongly disagreed, wanting his forces to be positioned inland to preserve their manoeuvrability. Eventually, Hitler intervened, imposing a compromise: half the armour would be allocated to the Army Groups defending the beaches, and half would be kept in reserve under Geyr von Schweppenburg; the latter, however, were not to be deployed without Hitler's direct order. Hitler made matters worse by appointing Rommel commander of Army Group B, covering all of northern France. This unworkable command structure was to have dire consequences when the invasion came.

The invasion duly came before dawn on 6 June 1944, in Normandy, far to the west of the sector where Rundstedt and Rommel had expected it. Rommel was on leave in Germany, many of the local commanders in Normandy were at a conference in Rennes, and Hitler was asleep at Berchtesgaden. But Rundstedt, now 68, was up before 03:00, trying to take charge of a confusing situation. He immediately saw that the reported Allied airborne landings in Normandy presaged a seaborne invasion. He contacted OKW and demanded that he be given authority to deploy the armoured reserves, but OKW could not agree to this without Hitler's approval. Hitler's refusal came through at 10:00, followed by his change of mind at 14:30, by which time the Allies were well ashore and the cloud cover had lifted, preventing the armour from moving until dusk. In mid-afternoon, Rundstedt ordered that "the Allies [be] wiped out before the day's end, otherwise the enemy would reinforce and the chance would be lost", but it was too late. Rundstedt's biographer concludes: "If Hitler had released the Panzer reserves as soon as Rundstedt had asked for them, the Allies would have experienced a much harder day on 6 June than they did." The historian Stephen E. Ambrose wrote: "The only high-command officer who responded correctly to the crisis at hand was Field Marshal Rundstedt, the old man who was there for window-dressing and who was so scorned by Hitler and OKW [...] Rundstedt's reasoning was sound, his actions decisive, his orders clear."

Being right was little consolation to Rundstedt. By 11 June, it was evident that the Allies could not be dislodged from their beach-head in Normandy. Their total command of the air and the sabotage of roads and bridges by the Resistance made bringing armoured reinforcements to Normandy slow and difficult, but without them, there was no hope of an effective counter-offensive. Supported by Rommel, he tried to persuade Keitel at OKW that the only escape was to withdraw from Normandy to a prepared defensive line on the Seine, but Hitler forbade any withdrawal. On 17 June, Hitler flew to France and met Rundstedt and Rommel at his command bunker near Soissons. Both Field Marshals argued that the situation in Normandy required either massive reinforcements (which were not available) or a rapid withdrawal. Remarkably, they both also urged that Hitler find a political solution to end the war, which Rommel told him bluntly was unwinnable. (Note: Wilmot's account is based on conversations with Blumentritt and General Hans Speidel, who were both present.) Hitler ignored all their demands, requiring "fanatical" defence and a counter-attack with whatever was available. Rommel warned Hitler about the inevitable collapse in the German defences, but was rebuffed and told to focus on military operations.

It was during the desperate German attempts to bring reserve units to the front that men under battalion commander SS-Sturmbannführer Adolf Diekmann of the Das Reich SS Panzer Division destroyed the village of Oradour-sur-Glane in central France, killing all its inhabitants. This was done in retaliation for partisan attacks in the area and the subsequent capture of SS-Sturmbannführer Helmut Kämpfe by partisans of Georges Guingouin in the hamlet of Le Bussière, on the road to Limoges. Rundstedt, the German commander-in-chief in France, had ordered Das Reich to head north to Normandy, and had previously condoned tough action against partisans who had killed or tortured German officers or personnel, including the shooting of hostages. He also authorised the use of terror against civilians. This was enough for the French government to demand after the war that he stand trial for the massacre at Oradour.

On 29 June, Rundstedt and Rommel were summoned to Berchtesgaden for a further meeting with Hitler, at which they repeated their demands and were again rebuffed. On his return to Saint-Germain, on 30 June, Rundstedt found an urgent plea from Schweppenburg, who was commanding the armoured force at Caen, to be allowed to withdraw his units out of range of Allied naval gunfire, which was decimating his forces. Rundstedt at once agreed and notified OKW of this decision. On 1 July, he received a message from OKW countermanding his orders. In a fury, he phoned Keitel, urging him to go to Hitler and get the decision reversed. Keitel pleaded that this was impossible. "What shall we do?" he asked. Rundstedt is said to have replied "Macht Schluss mit dem Krieg, ihr Idioten!" (one version of the story as told by Blumentritt did not include the "ihr Idioten"). This literally means "End the war, you idiots!", but has commonly been reported in English-language accounts as "Make peace, you idiots!" There has been some doubt raised as to whether Rundstedt actually said this, but Wilmot says the incident was recounted to him and Liddell Hart by Blumentritt, who was present. (Note: Blumentritt seems to have given several versions of the story to postwar questioners.)

Keitel conveyed to Hitler that Rundstedt felt unable to cope with the increased demands, and Hitler relieved him of his command, replacing him with Kluge. It is likely that Hitler had already decided that Rundstedt should be replaced after the meetings of 17 and 29 June. It was officially given out that Rundstedt was retiring on the grounds of age and ill health. Hitler wrote him a "very cordial" letter and awarded him the Oak Leaves to his Knight's Cross, one of the highest of the new decorations created in 1940. Rundstedt departed Saint-Germain for the last time on 4 July, accompanied by his son, and was driven back to the sanatorium at Bad Tölz to be reunited with his wife. He told Rommel on departing that he would never hold another military command.

=== Plot to kill Hitler ===
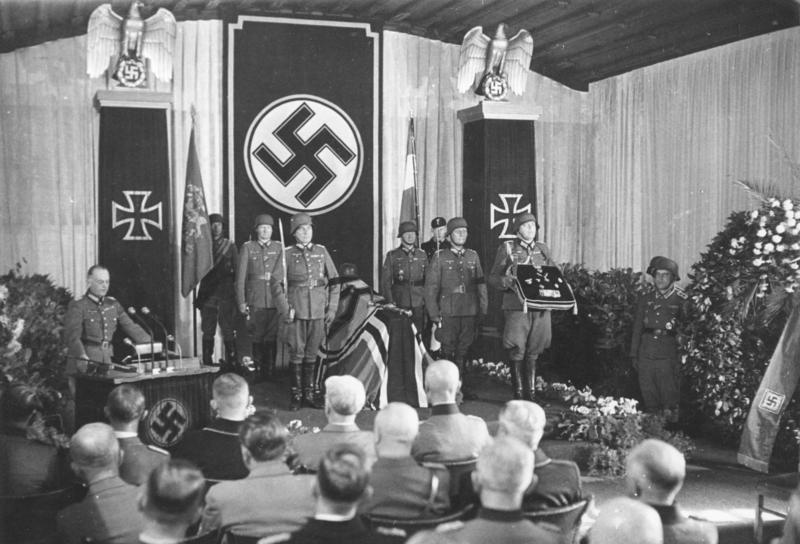
Rundstedt delivering the eulogy for Erwin Rommel, October 1944

Rundstedt had resisted all attempts to recruit him to the various conspiracies against Hitler that had been operating inside the German Army since 1938. Although he had not denounced or reported any of the officers who had approached him, he had shown no sympathy with their appeals. By June 1944 the conspirators had given up on him (and indeed on all the senior field commanders), so he was not approached by the group around Tresckow and Stauffenberg who hatched the unsuccessful plot to kill Hitler with a bomb at the Wolf's Lair (Wolfsschanze), his headquarters in East Prussia, and had no inkling of what was planned. When he heard of the attempt on 20 July, his reaction was very hostile. A year later, in June 1945, he told the investigating commission preparing for the Nuremberg Trials: "I would never have thought of such a thing, that would have been base, bare-faced treachery." (Note: Unfortunately, the text of Rundstedt's testimony before the Commission, as opposed to his testimony before the International Military Tribunal itself, is not available online.) Since he had every reason to try to put himself in a sympathetic light at Nuremberg, this certainly reflects his view in June 1944. He also argued, however, that the attempt to kill Hitler was pointless, because the German Army and people would not have followed the conspirators. "The Army and also the people still believed in Hitler at that time, and such an overthrow would have been quite unsuccessful". He reiterated his traditional sense of his duty as a soldier: had he supported the plot, he said, "I would have emerged and been considered for all time the greatest traitor to my Fatherland".

Officers like Rundstedt, who argued that a coup against Hitler would not have won support in the Army or among the German people, were, in the view of most historians, correct. Joachim Fest, writing of Tresckow, said: "Even officers who were absolutely determined to stage a coup were troubled by the fact that everything they were contemplating would inevitably be seen by their troops as dereliction of duty, as irresponsible arrogance, and, worst, as capable of triggering a civil war." On the attitude of the people, Fest wrote: "Most industrial workers remained loyal to the regime, even as the war ground on."

Rundstedt was thus above suspicion of involvement in the 20 July plot, but he could not escape entanglement in its bloody aftermath. A large number of senior officers were directly or indirectly implicated, headed by Field Marshals Kluge, Rommel (very peripherally) and Witzleben, and Generals Falkenhausen, Erich Fellgiebel, Friedrich Fromm, Paul von Hase, Gustav Heistermann von Ziehlberg, Otto Herfurth, Erich Hoepner, Fritz Lindemann, Friedrich von Rabenau, Hans Speidel, Helmuth Stieff, Stülpnagel, Fritz Thiele, Georg Thomas and Eduard Wagner, as well as Admiral Wilhelm Canaris. Many of these would have been known personally to Rundstedt. Witzleben was an old colleague, and Stülpnagel had been his subordinate in Ukraine and his colleague in France. (Note: Some believed Rundstedt to be a "very old friend" of Witzleben. But according to Messenger, "Outside his family he had no close friends as such.") These considerations do not seem to have influenced his conduct at all.

Hitler was determined not only to punish those involved in the plot, but to break the power, status, and cohesion of the Prussian officer corps once and for all. Since traditionally German officers could not be tried by civilian courts, he decided that the Army must expel all those accused of involvement. They could then be tried before the People's Court (Volksgerichtshof), a special court established in 1934 to try political crimes and presided over by the fanatical Nazi Roland Freisler. Hitler therefore ordered the convening of a "Court of Honour" (Ehrenhof) to carry out the expulsions, and appointed Rundstedt to head it. The other senior members were Generals Keitel and Guderian, (Note: Messenger and Wheeler-Bennett both suggest that the Court of Honour was Guderian's idea, agreed on as part of a deal with Martin Bormann to limit the scope of the purge which Hitler wanted to carry out in the officer corps.) Walther Schroth, and Karl-Wilhelm Specht. This court considered only evidence placed before it by the Gestapo. No defence counsel was permitted, and none of the accused was allowed to appear. On this basis, several officers were expelled from the Army, while others were exonerated. Among those the court declined to expel were Franz Halder (who had no involvement in the plot) and Hans Speidel, Rommel's chief of staff (who was deeply implicated). Those expelled appeared in batches before the People's Court, where, after perfunctory trials, most of them were executed by hanging. Rundstedt and Heinz Guderian have been singled out as the two who most contributed to Rommel's expulsion from the army, especially as both had good reason to dislike him; however, Rommel and Rundstedt had always had a grudging respect for one another, and Rundstedt later served as Hitler's representative at Rommel's state funeral in Ulm.

No incident in Rundstedt's career has damaged his posthumous reputation as much as his involvement in this process. John Wheeler-Bennett wrote in 1967: "To such a nadir of supine degradation had come the child of Scharnhorst and Gneisenau and Moltke." He called the Court "the final farce of casuistry" and accused the officer corps of washing its hands, Pilate-like, of their comrades. Rundstedt's biographer writes: "This was something for which some Germans, while they were prepared to forgive him everything else, could and cannot excuse him." Speidel, despite the fact that he was spared, was bitterly critical of Rundstedt after the war, when he became a senior officer in the new West German Army. Blumentritt, always loyal to his old Chef, complained in 1953: "He has had to endure vindictiveness and jealousy even up to and after the hour of his death."

=== Return to the West ===
The aftermath of the 20 July plot coincided with the rout of the German armies in both the east and the west. In the east, Operation Bagration destroyed Army Group Centre and drove the Germans out of Byelorussia and eastern Poland: they were also forced out of the Balkans. In the west, the Americans, British and Canadians broke out of the Normandy pocket and swept across France, taking Paris on 25 August and Brussels on 3 September. The German command in the west was reorganised following the suicide of Kluge, the arrest of Stülpnagel and the incapacitation of Rommel. (Note: Rommel was injured when an Allied plane strafed his staff car on 17 July. In October, he committed suicide rather than face charges of complicity in the 20 July plot.) Field Marshal Walter Model, known as "the Führer's fireman" for his reputation for stabilising dangerous situations, was appointed both OB West and commander of Army Group B on 16 August, but even he could not do justice to both jobs. At Blumentritt's urgent request, supported by Model, Hitler agreed to ask Rundstedt to resume his post as OB West, which at a meeting on 1 September he agreed to do, saying "My Führer, whatever you order, I shall do to my last breath."

The appointment of Rundstedt was at least in part a propaganda exercise. He was the most senior and one of the best known German Army commanders, both in Germany and abroad. His formidable reputation inspired confidence at home and trepidation among the enemy. His appointment was designed to impress the Allies, reassure the German people, and bolster the morale of the officer corps after the shock of 20 July and the subsequent purge. The Allies believed Rundstedt to be a far more powerful and influential figure than he in fact was, regarding him with "respect, almost awe" as the master strategist of the German Army – something he would not find helpful after the war. He had already appeared on the cover of Time magazine in August 1942, and did so again in August 1944, when it was suggested, quite wrongly, that he was behind the 20 July plot. There were even suggestions that he would take over leadership of the German state. But Hitler saw Rundstedt as a figurehead: he intended that operational control on the western front remain with the energetic and ruthless Model, a committed Nazi. Rundstedt, on the other hand, saw himself as the voice of experience, restraining the younger Model, whom he described as "courageous but impulsive."

With the comforts of Saint-Germain no longer available, Rundstedt established his headquarters near Koblenz. His chief of staff was now the capable General Siegfried Westphal. Under Rundstedt was Model, commanding Army Group B and facing the British and Canadians as they advanced through Belgium and into the Netherlands, and the Americans as they advanced into the Ardennes in southern Belgium and Luxembourg. Further south, Army Group G, commanded by General Hermann Balck, faced the Americans in Lorraine and Alsace, down to the Swiss border. In October, Army Group H in the north was split off from Model's very extended front and was placed under the command of the paratroop general Kurt Student.

Rundstedt believed even at this stage that an effective defensive line could only be established on the Rhine, but this would have meant giving up large areas of German territory, and Hitler would not countenance it. He insisted that a stand be made on the West Wall (known to the Allies as the Siegfried Line), a defensive system built along Germany's western frontiers in 1938–40, but partly dismantled in 1943–44 to provide materials for the Atlantic Wall. Model told OKW that this would require 25 divisions of fresh troops, but these were no longer to be had. Instead, the line was held by patched-up divisions escaping from the debacle in France, and Volksgrenadier divisions made up from transferred Navy and Air Force personnel, older men and teenagers: these units were fit for static defence, but not much else.

Nevertheless, the Germans now had certain advantages. In military terms, it is easier to defend a fixed line than it is to take one by storm. They were now fighting in defence of their own frontiers, and this stiffened their resolve. They no longer had to deal with partisans sabotaging their supply lines, and they were close to their own sources of supply in Germany. The Allies, on the other hand, had severe logistical problems, with their supply lines running all the way back to the Normandy beaches. The great port of Antwerp was in their hands, but the Germans still controlled the mouth of the Scheldt, so the Allies could not use it as a supply port. In September, the American tank armies in Lorraine literally ran out of fuel, and during October, the Allied offensive gradually lost momentum and came to a halt on a line well west of the German border in most sectors, although the frontier city of Aachen fell on 21 October. With the failure of the British attempt to force a crossing of the Rhine at Arnhem (Operation Market Garden) in late September, the chance of invading Germany before the winter set in was lost, and Rundstedt was given time to consolidate his position.

=== Ardennes Offensive ===
Hitler, however, had no intention of staying on the defensive in the west over the winter. As early as mid-September, he was planning a counter-offensive. By October, with the front stabilising, he had decided on an attack in the Ardennes, designed to split the British and American fronts at a weakly held point, cross the Meuse and recapture Antwerp. On 27 October, Rundstedt and Model met with General Alfred Jodl, chief of operations at OKW, and told him flatly that they considered this impossible with the available forces. Instead, they suggested a more modest operation to destroy the Allied concentrations around Liège and Aachen. Jodl took their views back to Hitler, but on 3 November, he told them that the Führer's mind was made up, and that he wanted the attack to begin before the end of November. The spearhead was to be the 6th Panzer Army, commanded by Sepp Dietrich and largely made up of Waffen-SS units such as the Leibstandarte, Das Reich and Hitlerjugend, and the 5th Panzer Army, commanded by General Hasso von Manteuffel.

Model persuaded Jodl that the deadline was unrealistic, and on 2 December, he and Westphal went to Berlin to argue their case with Hitler. Rundstedt refused to go, because, he said, he hated listening to Hitler's monologues. This marked his effective abdication as a military leader: he was now only a figurehead, and apparently content to be so. After the war, he disowned all responsibility for the offensive: "If old von Moltke thought that I had planned that offensive, he would have turned over in his grave." Hitler arrived on the western front on 10 December to supervise the offensive, which was now set for 16 December. He gave orders directly to the army commanders, bypassing both Rundstedt and Model. Manteuffel said: "The plan for the Ardennes offensive was drawn up completely by OKW and sent to us as a cut-and-dried Führer order."

Taking advantage of surprise and poor weather (which helped neutralise the Allies' command of the air), the offensive made initial progress, breaking through the weak American formations in this quiet sector of the front. But the Allies were quick to react, and the Germans were soon falling behind their ambitious timetables. To the north, Dietrich's 6th Panzer Army was blocked by stubborn defence at St. Vith and Elsenborn Ridge and advanced little more than 20 km. Manteuffel, in the centre, did better, reaching Celles, a few kilometres short of the Meuse, on 25 December. This was a penetration of about 80 km, less than halfway to Antwerp, and on such a narrow front as to create an indefensible salient. The resistance of the American garrison at Bastogne greatly delayed the advance, making a forcing of the Meuse impossible. When the cloud cover lifted on 24 December, the Allied air forces attacked with devastating effect. Rundstedt urged OKW to halt the offensive, lest the "bulge" created by the German advance become a "second Stalingrad", but Hitler was determined to press on. A few days later, U.S. forces attacked from the north and south of the bulge, forcing the Germans first to halt and then to retreat.

Waffen-SS units under Rundstedt's overall command committed war crimes during the campaign in the West, including the Malmedy massacre, which was perpetrated by troops under the command of Joachim Peiper. His unit of the SS division Leibstandarte was under the command of Wilhelm Mohnke. Peiper's battle group (Kampfgruppe) was charged with seizing the bridges over the Meuse ahead of the advance of the 6th Panzer Army. On 17 December, near Malmedy, a group of Peiper's men opened fire on a large group of unarmed U.S. prisoners of war, killing 84. Responsibility for this crime ran from Peiper to Mohnke to Dietrich to Model to Rundstedt, although none of them had been present and none had ordered such action. When Rundstedt heard about it, he ordered an investigation, but in the chaos of the failing offensive, nothing came of this.

Although such occurrences were commonplace on the Eastern Front from both sides, they were a rarity in the West, and the outraged Americans were determined to prosecute all those with responsibility for this massacre. Here, Rundstedt's problem was his reputation. The Ardennes offensive was known to the Allies as "the Rundstedt offensive", and the Allied press routinely described him as being in charge of it. The British commander in Europe, Field Marshal Bernard Montgomery, said on 7 January 1945: "I used to think that Rommel was good, but my opinion is that Rundstedt would have hit him for six. Rundstedt is the best German general I have come up against." Since Rundstedt, as far as the Allies knew, was in charge of the offensive, it followed for them that he was responsible for what his subordinates did during it.

=== Defence of the Rhine ===
On 8 January, Hitler authorised Manteuffel to withdraw from the tip of the bulge, and on 15 January, he gave up the whole enterprise and returned to Berlin. By the end of January, the Germans were back where they had started. But the offensive had burned up the last of Rundstedt's reserves of manpower, equipment and fuel, and as a result, neither the West Wall nor the Rhine could be properly defended. On 18 February, as the Allies entered Germany, Rundstedt issued an appeal to the German Army to resist the invader, urging the troops to "gather round the Führer to guard our people and our state from a destiny of horror." Hitler rewarded his loyalty with the Swords to his Knight's Cross. Despite fierce resistance in places, the Germans were forced back from the West Wall during February, and a series of Allied offensives, rolling from north to south, drove across the Rhineland towards the great river. On 2 March the Americans reached the Rhine near Düsseldorf. Rundstedt had been aware as early as September of the importance of the many bridges over the Rhine, and of the necessity of denying them to the enemy. He made careful plans for the bridges to be blown up if the enemy reached the Rhine. On 7 March, however, these plans failed when the Americans captured the Ludendorff Bridge at Remagen intact, and rapidly established a bridgehead on the eastern bank. This could hardly be blamed on Rundstedt, but he was the commander and Hitler needed a scapegoat.

=== Relief of command ===
On 9 March, Hitler phoned Rundstedt and told him he was to be replaced by Albert Kesselring, to be transferred from Italy. That was the end of Gerd von Rundstedt's military career after 52 years.

On 11 March, Rundstedt had a final audience with Hitler, who thanked him for his loyalty. He then returned to his home in Kassel, but bombing and the Allied advance into western Germany made him decide to move his family, first to Solz, a village south of Kassel, then to Weimar, Bayreuth, and finally back to the sanatorium at Bad Tölz where he had stayed several times before. Rundstedt's heart condition had worsened and he also suffered from arthritis. There was no attempt at further escape: Rundstedt, accompanied by Bila and Hans Gerd and a few staff, stayed at Bad Tölz until it was occupied by American forces on 1 May, the day after Hitler's suicide in Berlin. That evening, he was made a prisoner of war by troops from the 36th Infantry Division.

Rundstedt complained publicly several times during and after the war: "Without Hitler's consent, I can't even move my own sentry from my front door around to the back!" Privately with other generals, he referred to Hitler as that Bohemian corporal. Wilhelm Keitel once asked Hitler, "Do you realise that Rundstedt called you a Bohemian corporal?" and Hitler replied, "Yes, but he's the best field marshal I have."

== Post-war ==
=== In custody ===
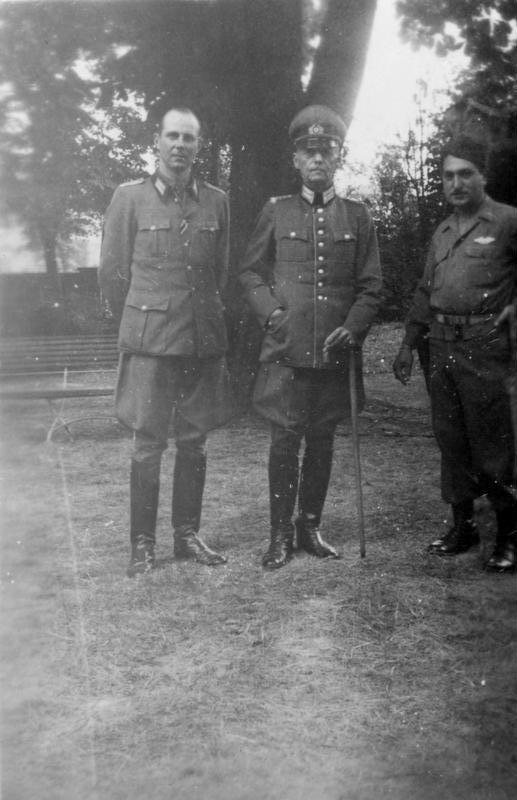
Rundstedt and his son, Hans Gerd von Rundstedt, following their capture.

Generalfeldmarschall von Rundstedt was initially held at the Allied facility for detaining high-ranking German officials, known as ASHCAN, in a hotel at Mondorf-les-Bains in Luxembourg. Out of consideration for his rank and state of health, Hans Gerd was allowed to accompany him. At the end of May, they were moved to an American detention centre at Wiesbaden. Here, Rundstedt was extensively questioned by United States Army interrogators about his career and actions during the war. During this period, decisions were being made about which German leaders were to be put on trial for war crimes at the Nuremberg trials. Rundstedt was the most senior German officer in Allied custody. He was accused of responsibility for war crimes in Poland (the shooting of surrendered soldiers in 1939), the Soviet Union (the actions of the Einsatzgruppen in 1941), Britain (the Commando Order of 1942) and France (the Oradour massacre of 1944). Eventually, the International Military Tribunal (IMT) decided that no German field commanders would be tried at Nuremberg. Instead, "the General Staff and High Command of the German Armed Forces" was collectively indicted. The only Army officers individually indicted were the OKW chiefs Keitel and Jodl, but they had never been field commanders.

In July, Rundstedt was handed over to British custody. (Note: His biographer has not been able to determine why this was done.) He was held first at Wilton Park in Buckinghamshire, then at Grizedale Hall in Cumbria, then at Island Farm near Bridgend in Glamorgan, South Wales. The British climate badly affected his arthritis, making him increasingly lame. His heart condition became worse and he was periodically depressed. One interviewer wrote: "A limp, exhausted body racked by constant pain due to weakened arteries is now the remnant of the relentless figure that once waved a Marshal's baton." During this period, he was extensively interviewed by the military writer Basil Liddell Hart, who later used these and other interviews as the basis for his books The Other Side of the Hill and its U.S. equivalent The German Generals Talk, published in 1948. Liddell Hart and Rundstedt developed a close rapport, and the relationship was to prove very valuable to Rundstedt over the next few years. Liddell Hart wrote of him: "Rundstedt makes an increasingly favourable impression on me [...] He is dignified without being arrogant, and essentially aristocratic in outlook."

=== Defence witness at Nuremberg ===
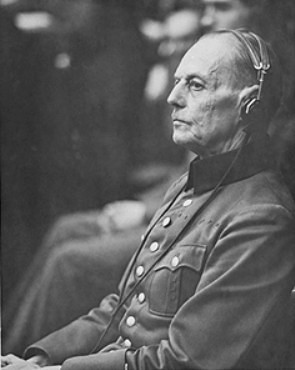
Rundstedt as a witness at the Nuremberg Trial

When Rundstedt learned that he was not to be tried personally at Nuremberg, he wrote to the tribunal asking permission to appear as a defence witness for the Army high command. In May 1946, he was summoned to appear. When he left Island Farm, all the 185 senior officers being held there lined up to salute him. On 19 June, he appeared before a preliminary hearing of the IMT Commission. Since he was a witness, not a defendant, the questioning was not intended to prove Rundstedt's guilt: it was designed to bolster the prosecution's case that the high command had functioned as an organisation and that it was collectively responsible for the German invasions of various countries between 1939 and 1941 and also for the war crimes committed during those invasions. Rundstedt was adamant that the high command played no part in the decisions to invade Poland, Norway, France or the Soviet Union. He insisted that the Army had obeyed the laws of war and was not responsible for the actions of the Einsatzgruppen. He also denied that the Army had deliberately starved three million Soviet prisoners of war to death in 1941–1942.

On 12 August, Rundstedt took the stand before the IMT itself. His counsel, Dr Hans Laternser, took him over the same ground that had been covered before the commission. He insisted that military law was "always binding for us older leaders", and that officers who broke these laws were court-martialed. He stated: "As a senior soldier of the German Army, I will say this: we accused leaders were trained in the old soldierly traditions of decency and chivalry. We lived and acted according to them, and we endeavoured to hand them down to the younger officers." Cross-examined by the British prosecutor Peter Calvocoressi, he stuck to his position that the high command did not function as an organisation. Senior commanders discussed only operational matters, he said: political and strategic questions were decided by Hitler and the OKW. Rundstedt made a good impression as a witness. Calvocoressi later commented: "He was not going to let on how much he and his colleagues had known or done. He did this well – or anyway successfully."

The success of Rundstedt's efforts was shown in October 1946, when the IMT handed down its verdicts. Keitel and Jodl were to be hanged, but the Army high command as a whole was acquitted. The verdict read: "According to the indictment, this group consists of about 130 officers who held certain positions in the military hierarchy between 1938 and 1945 [...] The Tribunal does not find that they were an organisation [...] They were only an aggregation of those who happened to hold high rank in a certain period [...] These men have, however, been a disgrace to the profession of arms, and they have made a mockery of obedience to orders. They were a ruthless military caste, and were guilty of crimes and should be brought to trial as individuals." Thus, the possibility was left open that Rundstedt could still face individual prosecution for his actions.

=== War crimes prosecution ===
Rundstedt returned to Island Farm to await developments. Otto John, a German lawyer who had been active in the German resistance, arrived in October to interview the prisoners and make recommendations on possible future war crimes prosecutions. John and Rundstedt got on well, and in November John arranged for Hans Gerd von Rundstedt, who was suffering from the early stages of throat cancer, to be released and sent home. In April 1947, the Allied War Crimes Investigation Group operating in Germany recommended that Rundstedt should not face prosecution. The U.S. government, however, did not accept this recommendation and insisted that Rundstedt, Manstein, Brauchitsch and General Rudolf Strauss (an Army commander on the Russian front in 1941) should stand trial. All four were in British custody. In August Telford Taylor, the U.S. chief counsel for war crimes, formally advised the British attorney-general, Sir Hartley Shawcross, of his intentions. The grounds for the prosecution would be the Commissar Order of 1941, the Commando Order of 1942, the murder of Soviet prisoners-of-war, the conscription and deportation of civilians in occupied countries as forced labour, and the responsibility of the named officers for the invasions of Poland, France, Yugoslavia, the Soviet Union and other countries.

The British, however, were extremely reluctant to act. British public opinion had rapidly shifted (as it did after World War I) away from anti-German sentiment towards a desire for reconciliation. There was a strong feeling that putting elderly and sick men on trial three years after the war was unjust. There was also the fact that many of the events referred to by the Americans had taken place in the Soviet Union and Poland, which were now, with the onset of the Cold War, political adversaries and no longer cooperating with Western war crimes investigations. The British military governor in Germany, Air Marshal Sir Sholto Douglas, was strongly opposed. He wrote: "We are apparently prepared to send these men, including one who is 73, to trial by the Americans. I frankly do not like this. I feel that if the Americans wish to be critical in our inaction in trying war criminals, I should prefer that they should continue to criticise rather than that we should commit an injustice in order to avoid their criticism."

Rundstedt and the other officers knew nothing of the proposed prosecutions. In June 1947, his son Hans Gerd was admitted to the hospital and it soon became apparent that his cancer was inoperable. In December, Rundstedt was granted compassionate leave by the British government to visit the hospital in Hanover where Hans Gerd was being treated. On Christmas Day, he saw his wife for the first time since May 1945, and his grandchildren for the first time since 1941. Hans Gerd died on 12 January 1948: "a blow from which he never really recovered." On Rundstedt's return, he was given a medical examination. The doctors reported "a markedly senile general physique", chronic arterio-sclerosis, osteoarthritis in most of his joints, and failing memory. The examiners advised that to put him on trial would "adversely affect his health." A similar recommendation was made about Brauchitsch, although Manstein was judged fit to stand trial. As a result, the Secretary of State for War, Manny Shinwell, recommended to Foreign Secretary Ernest Bevin that the prosecutions should not proceed. Bevin was put in a quandary, fearing the reactions of countries such as France and Belgium if Rundstedt were to be released. In March, the Soviet government formally demanded Rundstedt's extradition to the Soviet Union.

Meanwhile, the Americans had requested that Rundstedt and Manstein be brought to Nuremberg to appear as a witness in the High Command Trial, in which a number of prominent generals, including Leeb, Blaskowitz (who committed suicide during the trial), Hugo Sperrle, Georg von Küchler and Hermann Hoth were on trial for war crimes. In May, therefore, Rundstedt was transferred from Island Farm to a military hospital in Norfolk. On 22 July, Rundstedt left the hospital and the next day he and Manstein were flown to Nuremberg. But the presiding judge in the case ruled that he would not allow Rundstedt or Manstein to testify unless they were first informed whether they were themselves in danger of prosecution. Thus, Rundstedt and Manstein discovered for the first time that the Americans had requested their indictment. As a result, they refused to testify. They were then transferred to a military hospital near Munster. Here, conditions were so bad that Brauchitsch went on a hunger strike.

In August, the matter became public when Liddell Hart launched a press campaign to have the four officers released. He was supported by figures such as Michael Foot, Victor Gollancz and Lord De L'Isle, VC. On 27 August, the government responded by formally announcing that the four would be tried by a British military court in Hamburg. Items in Rundstedt's indictment included: "the maltreatment and killing of civilians and prisoners of war ... killing hostages, illegal employment of prisoners of war, deportation of forced labour to Germany ... mass execution of Jews ... and other war crimes, yet to be specified." On 24 September, the four were moved to a military hospital in Hamburg, where they were allowed to be visited by their families. It was here that Brauchitsch died suddenly of heart failure on 18 October. This led to a renewed outcry in Britain for the trial to be abandoned. Nevertheless, Bevin was determined to press ahead, and on 1 January 1949, Rundstedt, Manstein and Strauss were formally charged. Hugo Laternser was engaged as Rundstedt's counsel, and Liddell Hart and others in Britain collected material for the defence. The bishop of Chichester, George Bell, announced that he would bring in a motion in the House of Lords critical of the government. This was a serious threat since the Lords had the power to compel the government to produce documents.

By April, the public debate in Britain was becoming so damaging that the government decided that the best option was to back down as gracefully as it could. The government's resolve was stiffened by the refusal of the Soviet government to provide any evidence for the trial. Further medical reports were commissioned, with varying results. A team of British Army doctors eventually reported that Rundstedt and Strauss were unfit to stand trial, and the government used this as a pretext to abandon the trial. On 28 April, the Cabinet considered the medical reports and asked the Lord Chancellor, Lord Jowitt, to prepare a report for its next meeting. On 5 May Cabinet accepted his recommendation that Rundstedt and Strauss be released, but that Manstein's trial should go ahead. (Note: Manstein was convicted in December 1949 on the basis of charges almost identical to those brought against Rundstedt, and sentenced to 18 years in prison. He was paroled on medical grounds in August 1952.) Rundstedt was formally advised of his release on 19 May, but since he had nowhere to go, he stayed in the hospital until 26 May, when he finally left British custody and went to the home of his brother Udo at Ratzeburg in Schleswig-Holstein.

=== Last years ===
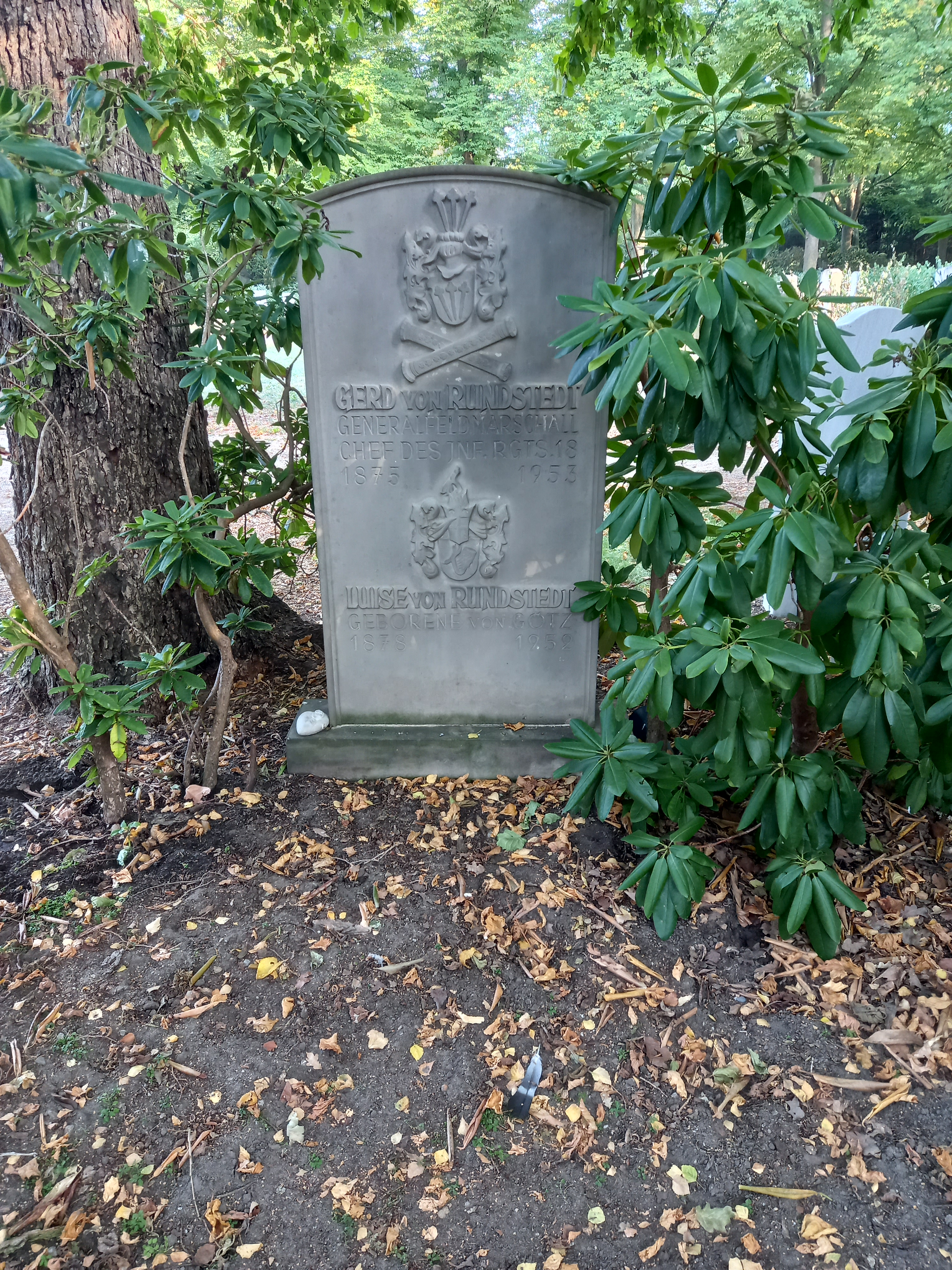
Grave in Stöcken

Rundstedt was now a free man after four years in custody, but it brought him little joy. He was 73, frail and in poor health. He had no home, no money and no income. The family home in Kassel had been requisitioned by the Americans, and the Rundstedt estate in Saxony-Anhalt was in the Soviet Zone and had been confiscated. His wife was living in Solz, but this was in the American Zone, where he could not travel because the Americans (who were displeased by the British decision to release him) still regarded him as a Class 1 war criminal under the denazification laws then in force. Likewise, his money, in a bank account in Kassel, was frozen because of his classification, which also denied him a military pension. The British had assured him that he would not be arrested or extradited if he stayed in the British Zone, but the Americans had made no such guarantee. "It is an awful situation for my poor wife and me," he wrote to Liddell Hart. "I would like to end this life as soon as possible."

Meanwhile, Rundstedt was in a hospital in Hanover with nowhere to live, and the new SPD administration in Lower Saxony had no interest in helping ex-field marshals of the Third Reich at a time when there was an acute housing shortage across Germany. (Note: Self-government in the German states had been restored in 1947. Lower Saxony became an SPD stronghold, and the government's attitude reflected the strong anti-militarist mood in Germany in the wake of the war. The minister-president, Hinrich Kopf, said he "would not lift a finger for a war criminal".) He and Bila were temporarily housed in an elderly person's home near Celle.

In the last years of his life, Rundstedt became a subject of increasing interest and was interviewed by various writers and historians. His former chief of staff, Günther Blumentritt, visited him frequently and began work on an apologetic biography, which was published in 1952. In 1951, he was portrayed sympathetically by Leo G. Carroll in a film about Rommel, The Desert Fox. Blumentritt and Liddell Hart raised money to provide nursing care for the Rundstedts. Bila died on 4 October 1952; Rundstedt died of heart failure on 24 February 1953 in Hanover. (He had already been at retirement age when World War II began.) He was buried in the Stöcken City Cemetery.

== Posthumous reputation ==
Rundstedt's defence at the trial was that as a soldier, he had a duty to obey the orders of the legitimate government, whoever that was, and whatever the orders were. He would have fully agreed with Manstein's remark to Rudolf von Gersdorff: "Preußische Feldmarschälle meutern nicht." ("Prussian field marshals do not mutiny.")

Since the charges brought against Manstein were almost identical to those brought against Rundstedt, it is worth quoting the remarks made by the prosecutor at Manstein's trial, Sir Arthur Comyns Carr: "Contemporary German militarism flourished briefly with its recent ally, National Socialism, as well as or better than it had in the generals of the past. Many of these have made a mockery of the soldier's oath of obedience to military orders. When it suits their purpose, they say they had to obey; when confronted with Hitler's brutal crimes, which are shown to have been within their general knowledge, they say they disobeyed. The truth is they actively participated in all these crimes, or sat silent and acquiescent, witnessing the commission of crimes on a scale larger and more shocking than the world has ever had the misfortune to know."

Rundstedt was left in no doubt by Hitler and Himmler what German occupation would mean for the people of Poland and the Soviet Union, yet he applied his military talents to the conquest of both countries. He approved of the Reichenau Order or Severity Order and must have known what it portended for the Jews of Ukraine, yet "sat silent and acquiescent" while the Einsatzgruppen did their work. He claimed that the Army would have liked to feed the three million Soviet POWs, yet he apparently took no interest in their fate once they were taken to the rear. He asserted that he had an absolute duty as an officer to obey orders, yet claimed to have disobeyed both the Commissar Order in Russia and the Commando Order in France. These inconsistencies were exposed both at Nuremberg, in the trials of the Einsatzgruppen leaders (who also claimed they had a duty to obey distasteful orders) and in the 1947 trials of senior officers, and in Manstein's trial in 1949. They would certainly also have been exposed if Rundstedt had come to trial. On this basis, his biographer concludes: "If Rundstedt had stood trial, it is clear from the Manstein case that he would have been found guilty of some of the charges levelled against him".

== Dates of rank ==
Dates of rank
Rank	Insignia	Date
Leutnant		17 June 1893
Oberleutnant		1 October 1901
Hauptmann		24 March 1909
Major		28 November 1914
Oberstleutnant		1 October 1920
Oberst		1 March 1923
Generalmajor		1 November 1927
Generalleutnant		21 March 1929
General der Infanterie		1 October 1932
Generaloberst		1 March 1938
Generalfeldmarschall		19 July 1940

== Awards ==
- Knight's Cross of the Iron Cross on 30 September 1939 as Generaloberst and commander in chief of Army Group South
  - 519th recipient of Oak Leaves for his Knight's Cross on 1 July 1944 as Generalfeldmarschall and Oberbefehlshaber West (commander in chief west)
  - 133rd recipient of Oak Leaves and Swords for his Knight's Cross on 18 February 1945 as Generalfeldmarschall and Oberbefehlshaber West (commander in chief west)
- Clasp to the Iron Cross (1939) 2nd Class (16 September 1939) and 1st Class (21 September 1939)

== See also ==
- Bribery of senior Wehrmacht officers
- Severity Order

== Bibliography ==
- Ambrose, Stephen (1994). D-Day, June 6, 1944: The Climactic Battle of World War II. New York: Simon & Schuster. ISBN 978-0-671-88403-1.
- Browning, Christopher (2004). The Origins of the Final Solution: The Evolution of Nazi Jewish Policy: September 1939 – March 1942. Lincoln: University of Nebraska Press. ISBN 978-0-8032-5979-9.
- Clark, Alan (1965). Barbarossa: The Russian-German Conflict 1941–1945. William Morrow and Company. OCLC 364670.
- Faber, David (2009). Munich, 1938: Appeasement and World War II. New York: Simon & Schuster. ISBN 978-1-4391-4992-8.
- Fest, Joachim (1996). Plotting Hitler's Death: The German Resistance to Hitler, 1933–1945. London: Weidenfeld & Nicolson. ISBN 978-0-297-81774-1.
- Friedländer, Saul (2009). Nazi Germany and the Jews, 1933–1945. New York: Harper Perennial. ISBN 978-0-06-135027-6.
- Fritz, Stephen (2011). Ostkrieg: Hitler's War of Extermination in the East. Lexington, Kentucky: University Press of Kentucky. ISBN 9780813161198. Archived from the original on 29 March 2016.
- Gildea, Robert (2003). Marianne in Chains: Everyday Life in the French heartland under the German Occupation. New York: Metropolitan Books. ISBN 978-0-8050-7168-9.
- Hamburg Institute for Social Research (1999). The German Army and Genocide: Crimes against War Prisoners, Jews, and other Civilians in the East, 1939–1944. New York: The New Press. ISBN 978-1-56584-525-1. (Reproduces many photos taken by German soldiers of mass killings of Jews and public executions of so-called partisans and others)
- Hargreaves, Richard (2008). The Germans in Normandy. Mechanicsburg, PA: Stackpole Books. ISBN 978-0-8117-3513-1.
- Hastings, Max (1983). Das Reich: Resistance and the March of the 2nd SS Panzer Division through France, June 1944. London: Pan. ISBN 978-0-330-26966-7.
- Heer, Hannes; Naumann, Klauss, eds. (2000). War of Extermination: The German Military in World War II, 1941–1944. New York: Berghahn Books. ISBN 978-1-57181-232-2.
- Hillgruber, Andreas (1989). "War in the East and the Extermination of the Jews". In Marrus, Michael (ed.). Part 3, The "Final Solution": The Implementation of Mass Murder, Volume 1. The Nazi Holocaust – Historical Articles on the Destruction of European Jews. Westpoint, Connecticut: Meckler. pp. 85–114. ISBN 0-88736-266-4.
- "Hitler Calls "Crisis" Conference". The Argus (Melbourne). No. 30, 599. Victoria, Australia. 22 September 1944. p. 1 – via National Library of Australia.
- Hoffmann, Peter (2003). Stauffenberg: A Family History, 1905–1944. Montréal, Québec: McGill–Queen's University Press. ISBN 978-0-7735-2595-5.
- Kershaw, Ian (2000a). Hitler, 1936–1945: Nemesis. New York; London: W. W. Norton & Company. ISBN 978-0-393-04994-7.
- Kershaw, Robert (2000b). War without Garlands: Operation Barbarossa, 1941/1942. Shepperton: Ian Allan Publishing. ISBN 978-0-7110-2734-3.
- Liddell Hart, Basil (1958). The German Generals Talk. Berkley. OCLC 721502207.
- Liddell Hart, Basil (1999). The Other Side of the Hill. London: Pan. ISBN 9780330373241. (original edition Cassell 1948 OCLC 4823888)
- Lieb, Peter (2014). "Chapter 5: Rommel in Normandy". In Beckett, Ian F. W. (ed.). Rommel Reconsidered. Mechanicsburg, Pennsylvania: Stackpole Books. ISBN 978-0-8117-1462-4.
- Longerich, Peter (2011). Heinrich Himmler: A Life. Oxford: Oxford University Press. ISBN 978-0-199-59232-6. (German edition 2008 ISBN 978-3-88680-859-5)
- Margaritis, Peter (2019). Countdown to D-Day: The German Perspective. Oxford, UK & PA, USA: Casemate Publishers. ISBN 978-1-61200-769-4.
- Matthäus, Jürgen. "Chapter 7: Operation Barbarossa and the Onset of the Holocaust, June–December 1941". In Browning (2004).
- Mawdsley, Evan (2005). Thunder in the East: The Nazi-Soviet war, 1941–1945. London: Hodder Arnold. ISBN 978-0-340-80808-5.
- Mayer, Arno J. (1988). Why Did The Heavens Not Darken?. New York: Pantheon Books. ISBN 0-394-57154-1.
- McCarthy, Peter; Syron, Mike (2003). Panzerkrieg: A History of the German Tank Division in World War II. London: Robinson. ISBN 978-1-84119-800-2.
- Melvin, Mungo (2011). Manstein: Hitler's Greatest General. London: Phoenix. ISBN 978-0-7538-2853-3.
- Messenger, Charles (2011). The Last Prussian: A Biography of Field Marshal Gerd von Rundstedt 1875–1953. Pen and Sword Books. ISBN 978-1-84884-662-3.
- Neillands, Robin (2006). The Battle for the Rhine 1944: Arnhem and the Ardennes: The Campaign in Europe, 1944–1945. London: Cassell Military. ISBN 978-0-304-36736-8.
- "Nuremberg Trial Proceedings: Vol. 1 – Indictment". Avalon Project.
- O'Neill, Robert (1966). The German Army and the Nazi Party. Heinemann (publisher). OCLC 86066783.
- Overy, Richard (2002). Interrogations: The Nazi Elite in Allied Hands, 1945. New York: Penguin Books. ISBN 978-0-14-200158-5.
- Owen, James (2006). Nuremberg: Evil on Trial. London: Headline Publishing Group. ISBN 978-0-7553-1599-4.
- Paxton, Robert (1972). Vichy France: Old Guard and New Order 1940–1944. Columbia University Press. ISBN 978-0-231-05426-3.
- "Purge of German Army". The Argus (Melbourne). No. 30, 559. Victoria, Australia. 7 August 1944. p. 16 – via National Library of Australia.
- "Der "Reichenau-Befehl": Das Verhalten der Truppe im Osten" [The "Reichenau Order": The Behavior of the Troops in the Eastern Region]. NS-Archiv: Dokumente zum Nationalsozialismus [Nazi Archive: Documents on National Socialism] (in German). 12 October 1941.
- Reynolds, Michael (2009). The devil's Adjutant: Jochen Peiper, Panzer Leader. Barnsley: Pen and Sword Books. ISBN 978-1-84884-010-2.
- Rhodes, Richard (2003). Masters of Death: The SS Einsatzgruppen and the Invention of the Holocaust. Vintage. ISBN 978-0-375-70822-0.
- Scherzer, Veit (2007). Die Ritterkreuzträger 1939–1945 Die Inhaber des Ritterkreuzes des Eisernen Kreuzes 1939 von Heer, Luftwaffe, Kriegsmarine, Waffen-SS, Volkssturm sowie mit Deutschland verbündeter Streitkräfte nach den Unterlagen des Bundesarchives [The Knight's Cross Bearers 1939–1945 The Holders of the Knight's Cross of the Iron Cross 1939 by Army, Air Force, Navy, Waffen-SS, Volkssturm and Allied Forces with Germany According to the Documents of the Federal Archives] (in German). Jena, Germany: Scherzers Militaer-Verlag. ISBN 978-3-938845-17-2.
- Stahel, David (2012). Kiev 1941: Hitler's Battle for Supremacy in the East. Cambridge University Press. ISBN 978-1-107-01459-6.
- Strachan, Hew (2006). "Time, Space and Barbarisation: the German Army and the Eastern Front in Two World Wars". In Kassimeris, George (ed.). The Barbarisation of Warfare. New York: New York University Press. p. 80. ISBN 9780814747971.
- Thomas, Franz (1998). Die Eichenlaubträger 1939–1945 [The Oak Leaves Bearers 1939–1945] (in German). Vol. 2: L–Z. Osnabrück, Germany: Biblio-Verlag. ISBN 978-3-7648-2300-9.
- "The Trial of German Major War Criminals: Sitting at Nuremberg, Germany, Two Hundred-First Day: Monday, 12th August, 1946 (Part 4 of 10)". Nizkor Project. Archived from the original on 25 September 2012.
- Wheeler-Bennett, John (1967). The Nemesis of Power: The German Army in Politics 1918–1945. Macmillan Publishers. OCLC 58591736.
- Wilmot, Chester (1952). The Struggle for Europe. Collins. OCLC 838157. (This book is out of date as military history, but is of historical interest as much of it was based on interviews with participants while their memories were fresh.)
- "The Wind from Tauroggen". Time. Vol. XLIV, no. 8. 21 August 1944.

Military offices
Preceded by General der Infanterie Joachim von Stülpnagel	Commander of the 3. Division; 1 February 1932 – 1 October 1932	Succeeded by Generalleutnant Werner Freiherr von Fritsch
Preceded by none	Oberbefehlshaber West; 10 October 1940 – 1 April 1941	Succeeded by Generalfeldmarschall Erwin von Witzleben
Preceded by Generalfeldmarschall Erwin von Witzleben	Oberbefehlshaber West; 15 March 1942 – 2 July 1944	Succeeded by Generalfeldmarschall Günther von Kluge
Preceded by Generalfeldmarschall Walter Model	Oberbefehlshaber West; 3 September 1944 – 11 March 1945	Succeeded by Generalfeldmarschall Albert Kesselring
Awards and achievements
Preceded by Jawaharlal Nehru	Cover of Time Magazine; 31 August 1942	Succeeded by Frank Knox
Preceded by Sir Arthur Coningham	Cover of Time Magazine; 21 August 1944	Succeeded by Alexander Patch
