= Court of Military Honour =

Drumhead court-martial in Nazi Germany

The Court of Military Honour (German: Ehrenhof) was a drumhead court-martial in Nazi Germany, composed of high-ranking officers of the Wehrmacht, which was formed by a Führer decree (Führererlass) on 2 August 1944.

The court had the express task of identifying and expelling officers of the German Army who, according to the Gestapo, had participated in the 20 July plot against Adolf Hitler. The aim of the decree was to avoid having to bring the leaders of the military resistance to the Nazi regime before a military trial of the Reich Court-Martial (Reichskriegsgericht), in accordance with German military law. Instead, they were brought before a show trial of the People's Court (Volksgerichtshof).

== Composition ==
Hitler appointed the following officers to the court (military rank at the time of the decree):

Portrait	Name (Lifespan)	Notes
Members
	Generalfeldmarschall; Wilhelm Keitel (1882–1946)	Chief of the OKW
	Generalfeldmarschall; Gerd von Rundstedt (1875–1953)	OB West; chairman of the court (as the longest serving officer)
	Generaloberst; Heinz Guderian (1888–1954)	Chief of General Staff of the OKH
	General der Infanterie; Walther Schroth (1882–1944)	
	Generalleutnant; Karl-Wilhelm Specht (1894–1953)	
Deputies
	General der Infanterie; Karl Kriebel (1888–1961)	
	Generalleutnant; Heinrich Kirchheim (1882–1973)	

== Manner of proceedings ==
Hitler reserved the right to personally decide on the applications of the Court of Honor. Neither the accused nor the defense attorneys were heard. Between 4 August and 14 September 1944, a total of 55 army officers were expelled from the Wehrmacht and another 29 were dismissed at the suggestion of the Court of Honour.

Their expulsion from the Wehrmacht was the prerequisite for them being handed over to the People's Court for trial and not to the Reich Court-Martial, which was actually responsible.

== See also ==
- Sondergericht
- Kangaroo court

== Bibliography ==
- (in German) Arnim Ramm: Der 20. Juli vor dem Volksgerichtshof. Wissenschaftlicher Verlag Berlin, Berlin 2007, ISBN 978-3-86573-264-4 (Schriften zur Rechtswissenschaft 80), (Zugleich: Kiel, Univ., Diss., 2006).
- (in German) Günter Gribbohm: Das Reichskriegsgericht. Die Institution und ihre rechtliche Bewertung. Berliner Wissenschafts-Verlag, Berlin 2004, ISBN 3-8305-0585-X (Juristische Zeitgeschichte. Abt. 1: Allgemeine Reihe 14).
