= Karl Kriebel =

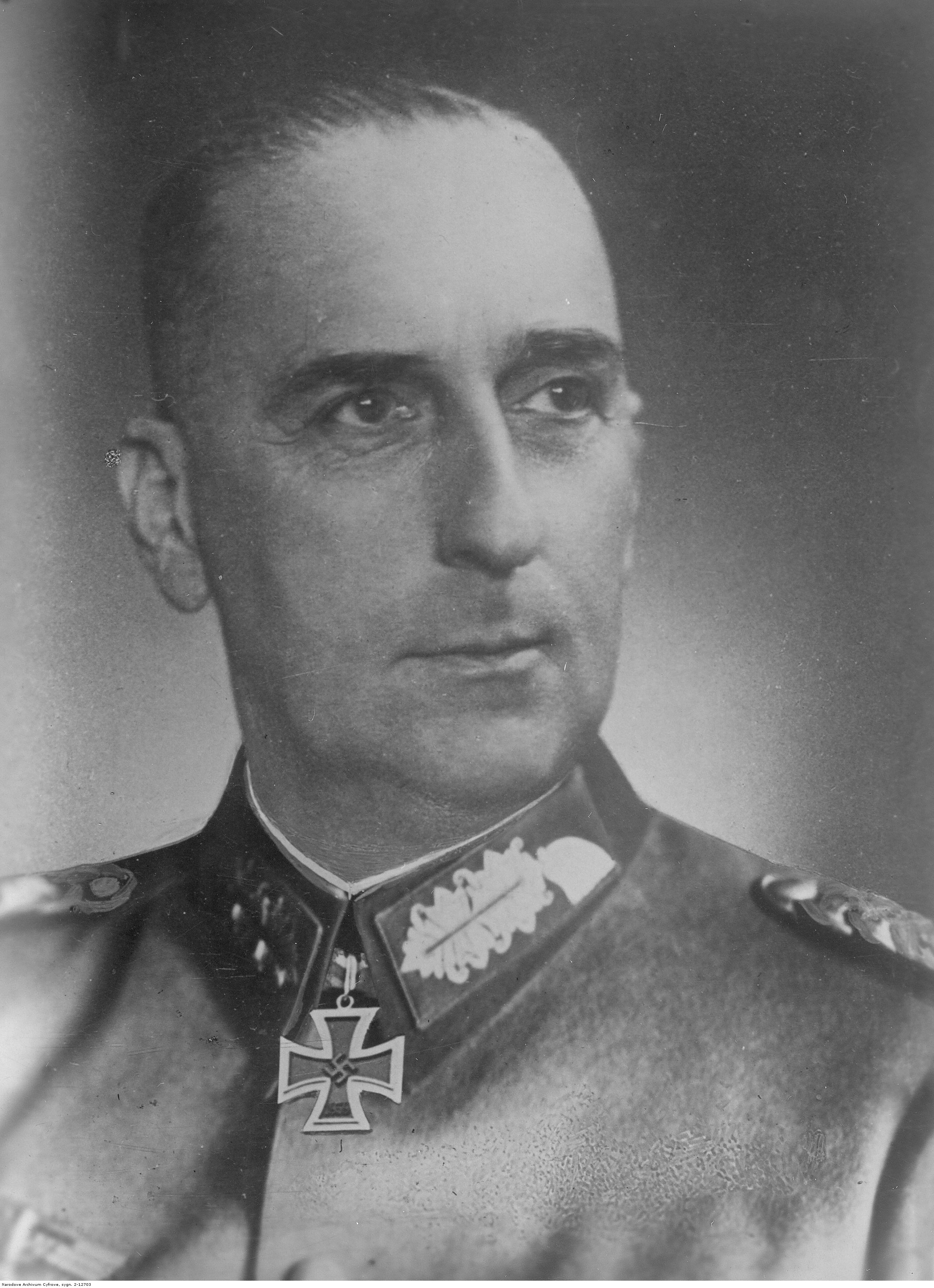
- Born: 26 February 1888; Metz, Alsace-Lorraine
- Died: 28 November 1961 (aged 73); Sparenberg, Germany
- Military career
- Allegiance: German Empire (to 1918); Weimar Republic (to 1933); Nazi Germany
- Branch: Army (Wehrmacht)
- Service years: 1907–1945
- Rank: General of the Infantry
- Commands: 56 Infantry Division; 46th Infantry Division
- Conflicts: World War I World War II: Invasion of Poland; Battle of Belgium; Battle of France; Invasion of Yugoslavia; Operation Barbarossa; Crimean Campaign (1941–1942)
- Awards: Knight's Cross of the Iron Cross

Karl Kriebel (26 February 1888 – 28 November 1961) was a general in the Wehrmacht of Nazi Germany during World War II. He was a recipient of the Knight's Cross of the Iron Cross.

At the beginning of World War II, Kriebel was appointed commander of 56th Infantry Division. Later, he commanded several other divisions. He also served as a deputy member on the "Court of Military Honour," a drumhead court-martial that expelled many of the officers involved in the 20 July Plot from the Army before handing them over to the People's Court.

== Awards and decorations ==
- Knight's Cross of the Iron Cross on 4 July 1940 as Generalmajor and commander of 56. Infanterie-Division

Military offices
Preceded by none	Commander of 56. Infanterie-Division; September 1939 – 24 July 1940	Succeeded by Generalleutnant Paul von Hase
Preceded by Generalleutnant Paul von Hase	Commander of 46. Infanterie-Division; 24 July 1940 – 17 September 1941	Succeeded by Generalleutnant Kurt Himer
