= Karl-Wilhelm Specht =

German Army general (1894-1953)

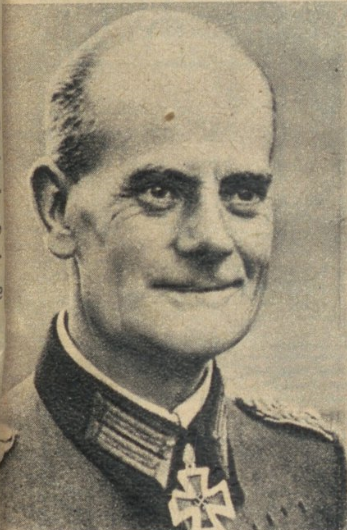
- Born: 22 May 1894
- Died: 3 December 1953 (aged 59); Voikovo prison camp near Ivanovo
- Military career
- Allegiance: German Empire; Weimar Republic; Nazi Germany
- Branch: German Army
- Service years: 1914–1945
- Rank: General der Infanterie
- Commands: Infantry Regiment 55
- Conflicts: World War I; World War II; Invasion of Poland; Battle of France; Operation Barbarossa; Battle of Białystok–Minsk; Battle of Smolensk (1941); Battle of Moscow; East Prussian Offensive
- Awards: Knight's Cross of the Iron Cross with Oak Leaves

Karl-Wilhelm Specht (22 May 1894 – 3 December 1953) was a general in the Wehrmacht of Nazi Germany during World War II. He was a recipient of the Knight's Cross of the Iron Cross with Oak Leaves. He served on the "Court of Military Honour," a drumhead court-martial that expelled many of the officers involved in the 20 July Plot from the army before handing them over to the People's Court. Specht surrendered to the Soviet forces at the end of the war and died in Voikovo prison camp on 3 December 1953.

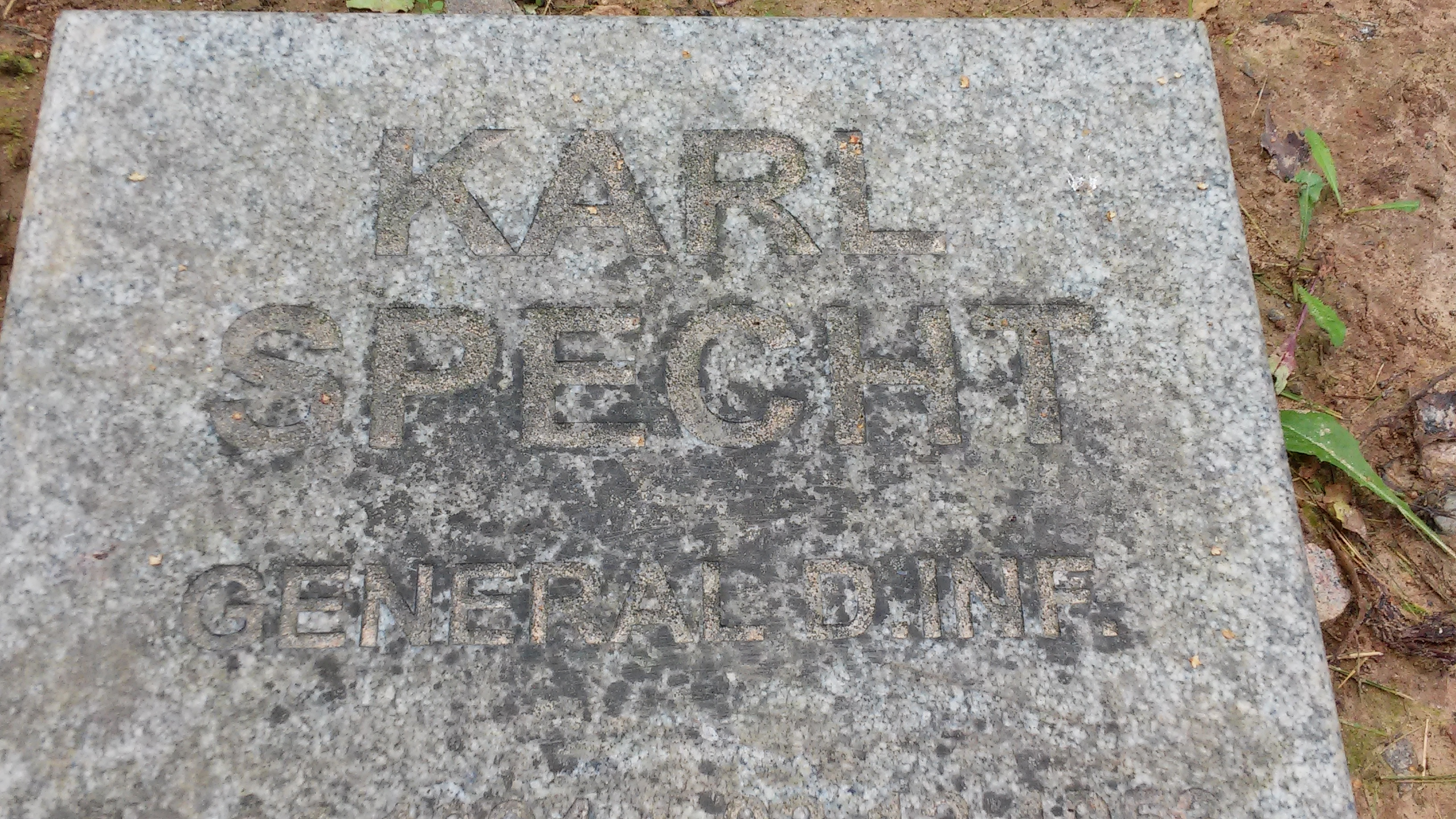
Grave in Cherntsy

== Awards and decorations ==
- Iron Cross (1914) 2nd Class (22 January 1915) & 1st Class (28 April 1917)
- Clasp to the Iron Cross (1939) 2nd Class (21 December 1939) & 1st Class (9 June 1940)
- Knight's Cross of the Iron Cross with Oak Leaves
  - Knight's Cross on 8 September 1941 as Oberst and commander of Infanterie-Regiment 55
  - 60th Oak Leaves on 16 January 1942 as Oberst and commander of Infanterie-Regiment 55
