= List of people from Metz =

== Notable people from Metz ==
Notable people born in or near Metz (sorted by category):

Activism and politics

- Jean-Jacques Aillagon (1946), French politician and contemporary and modern arts connoisseur
- Charles Ancillon (1659–1715), French jurist and diplomat
- François Barbé-Marbois (1745–1837), French politician
- Peter Bell (1889–1939), German teacher and politician
- Jean Burger (1907–1945), French resistant
- Marte Cohn (1920–2025), French spy during World War II
- Désiré Ferry (1886–1940), French politician
- Volker Hassemer (1944), German senator
- Jean Laurain (1921–2008), French philosopher and politician
- Willy Huhn (1909–1970), German council communism theorist
- Pierre Louis Roederer (1754–1835), French politician and economist
- Fritz von Twardowski, German diplomat

Adventure

- Jean Bernanos (1648–1695), French filibuster and privateer
- Jean-François Pilâtre de Rozier (1757–1785), first man to fly in a hot air balloon

Arts

- Walter Curt Behrendt (1884–1945), German-American architect
- Solange Bertrand (1913–2011), French abstract painter, sculptor and engraver
- Christopher Fratin (1801–1864), French animalier sculptor
- Monsù Desidero (1593–ca. 1640), French painter, also known as François de Nomé or Didier Barra
- Louis-Théodore Devilly (1818–1888), French painter
- Oskar Kurt Döbrich (1911–1970), German painter and graphic designer
- Auguste Hussenot (1799–1885), French painter
- Jutta Jol (1896–1981), German actress
- Charles Willy Kayser (1881–1942), German actor
- Abraham-César Lamoureux (c. 1640–1692), French sculptor in Sweden and Denmark
- Tiana Lemnitz (1897–1994), German operatic soprano
- Jean-Baptiste Le Prince (1734–1781), French etcher and painter
- Charles-Laurent Maréchal (1801–1887), French painter and master glass maker
- Paul Niclausse (1879–1958), French sculptor
- Jean-Marie Straub (1933), French cineast
- Walter Ulbrich (1910–1991), German film producer
- Hugo Becker (1987), French actor

Business

- Thierry Antinori (*1961), French aviation Manager

Literature and poetry

- Joseph Décembre (1836–1906), French writer and freemason
- Otto Flake (1880–1963), German writer
- Rudolf John Gorsleben (1883–1930), German ariosophist
- Pierre Hanot (born 1952), French novelist, visual artist and musician
- Gustave Kahn (1859–1936), French poet
- Bernard-Marie Koltès (1948–1989), French playwright and director
- Wilhelm Michel (1877–1942), German writer
- Ernst Moritz Mungenast (1898–1964), German writer and journalist
- Frieda von Richthofen (1879–1956), German writer
- Raymond Schwartz (1894–1973), German writer and Esperantist
- André Schwarz-Bart (1928–2006), French novelist
- Stephen Michael Stirling (1953), Canadian-American writer
- Paul Verlaine (1844–1896), French poet
- Hermann Wendel (1884–1936), German writer
- Anny Wienbruch (1899–1976), German writer

Military

- Basile Guy Marie Victor Baltus de Pouilly (1766–1845), French general
- Hans Benda (1877–1951), German admiral
- Theodor Berkelmann (1894–1943), German general
- Julius von Bernuth (1897–1942), German general
- Ludwig Bieringer (1892–1975), German general
- Helmuth Bode (1907–1985), German officer
- Walter Bordellé (1918–1984), German officer
- Karl Braun, (1885–1945) German pilot
- Arthur von Briesen (1891–1981), German general
- Erich von Brückner (1896–1949), German officer
- Jean Baptiste Noël Bouchotte (1754–1840), French officer
- Peter-Erich Cremer (1911–1992), German officer
- Adam Philippe, Comte de Custine (1740–1793), French general
- Joachim Degener (1883–1953), German general
- Abraham de Fabert (1599–1660/62), Marshal of France
- Kurt von Falkowski (1886–1953), German general
- Wilhelm Falley (1897–1944), German general
- Simon de Faultrier (1763–1815), French general
- Edgar Feuchtinger (1894–1960), German general
- Louis Charles Folliot de Crenneville (1763–1840), Austrian general
- Herbert Gundelach (1899–1971), German general
- Heinz Harmel (1906–2000), German general
- Kurt Haseloff (1894–1978), German general
- Johannes Hintz (1898–1944), German general
- Sigmund von Imhoff (1881–1967), German general
- François Étienne de Kellermann (1770–1835), French general
- Walther Kittel (1887–1971), German general
- Arthur Kobus (1879–1945), German general
- Karl Kriebel (1888–1961), German general
- Otto Krueger (1891–1976), German general
- Henry Dominique Lallemand (1777–1823), French general
- Charles Lallemand (1774–1839), French general
- Joachim-Friedrich Lang (1899–1945), German general
- Antoine Charles Louis Lasalle (1775–1809), French general
- Hans Leistikow (1895–1967), German general
- Hans-Albrech Lehmann (1894–1976), German general
- Joachim von der Lieth-Thomsen (1896–1918), German Pilot
- Rolf von Lilienhoff-Zwowitzky (1895–1956), German naval officer
- Friedrich Marnet (1882–1915), German pilot
- Johannes Mühlenkamp (1910–1986), German officer
- Eugen Müller (1891–1951), German general
- Henri-Joseph Paixhans (1783–1854), French officer
- Ferdinand von Parseval (1791–1854), Bavarian general
- Joachim Pötter (1913–1992), German officer
- Antoine Richepanse (1770–1802), French general
- Günther Rüdel (1883–1950), German general
- Hans von Salmuth (1888–1962), German general
- Hermann Schaefer (1885–1962), German general
- Ernst Schreder (1892–1941), German general
- Otto Schumann (1886–1952), German general
- Rudolf Schmundt (1896–1944), German general
- Ludwig Weißmüller (1915–1943), German officer
- Ernst Wieblitz (1883–1973), German naval officer
- Charles Victor Woirgard (1764–1810), French general
- Bodo Zimmermann (1886–1963), German general

Music

- Heinrich Bensing (1911–1955), German opera singer
- Philippe Boivin (born 1954), French composer
- Gabriel Pierné (1863–1937), French composer and conductor
- Paul Pierné (1874–1952), French composer and organist
- Hans Pizka (1942), Austrian hornist
- Claude Cymerman (1947), French classical pianist
- Maximilien Simon (1797–1861), French composer
- Ambroise Thomas (1811–1896), French opera composer
- Louis Corte (1972), French songwriter, producer, singer

Religion

- Joseph Coincé (1764–1833), Jesuit and physician
- Rabbenu Gershom (ca. 960–ca. 1028), famous Talmudist and Halakhaist
- Saint Livier of Marsal (ca. 400–451), Christian martyr, defender of Metz against Attila's Huns
- Eliezer ben Samuel of Metz (ca. 1100-1175), Tosafist, author of the halachic work Sefer Yereim
- Nicolas Janny (1749–1822), priest, pedagogue and grammarian
- Saint Marie-Eugénie de Jésus (1817–1898), founder of the Religious of the Assumption
- Pierre Poiret (1646–1719), Calvinic mystic and philosopher
- Marguerite Rutan (1736–1794), French Roman Catholic religious person, member of the Vincentian Sisters
- Aaron Worms (1754–1836), Rabbi and Tamuldist

Sciences and knowledge

- Max Braubach (1899–1975), German historian
- Laurent de Chazelles (1724–1808) French agronomist
- Robert Folz (1910–1996), French historian
- Claude François Lallemand (1790–1854), physician
- Louis Le Prince (1842–vanished in 1890), first man to shoot moving images
- Émile Léonard Mathieu (1835–1890), French mathematician
- Victor Nigon (1920-2015), French biologist
- Alfred Pérot (1863–1925), French physician
- Jean-Victor Poncelet (1788–1867), French mathematician
- Karl Süpfle (1880–1942), German physiologist
- Leo Weisgerber (1899–1985), German linguist
- Luise von Winterfeld (1882–1962), German archivist

Sports

- Ginette Bedard (1933), French-American long-distance runner
- Jean-Marcellin Buttin (1991), French rugby union player
- Simon Delestre (1981), French equestrian
- Ugo Humbert (1998), French tennis player
- Jeanne Lehair (1996), French triathlete
- Morgan Parra (1988), French rugby union player
- Cédric Schille (1975), French former footballer
- Anni Steuer (1913), German athlete
- Bouabdellah Tahri (1978), French athlete

== Notable people linked to the city of Metz ==
Notable people linked to Metz (sorted by chronology):

- Hermann von Münster (ca. 1330–1392), Westphalian master glassmaker who realized the western windows of the Saint-Stephen cathedral and was honoured, buried into the cathedral for his artworks.
- François Rabelais (ca. 1494–1553), French Renaissance writer, doctor and Renaissance humanist, came in 1546 to Metz, then a free imperial city and a republic, to escape the condemnation for heresy by the University of Paris.
- Ambroise Paré (ca. 1510–1590), French surgeon, participated to the defense of Metz during the siege of 1552-1553. The journal of the siege of Metz in 1552 reports: "Although born in Laval in the province of Maine, he is regarded as belonging to our pays because of his participation in this memorable action."
- Francis of Lorraine, Duke of Guise (1519–1563), French statesman. Appointed governor of Metz by King Henri II, he successfully defended the city from the forces of Emperor Charles V during the siege of 1552-1553.
- Cardinal Mazarin (1602–1661), French-Italian cardinal, diplomat, and politician, Bishop of Metz between 1652 and 1658.
- Jacques-Bénigne Bossuet (1627–1704), French bishop and theologian, nominated archdeacon in Metz in 1654.
- Charles Louis Auguste Fouquet, duc de Belle-Isle (1684–1761), French general and statesman, governor of the Three Bishoprics and benefactor of the city of Metz. He participated to the edification of the Petit-Saulcy island's buildings including the opera house and the prefecture palace, and the buildings of the town square. Just before his death, he stated: "The city of Metz is my mistress."
- Gilbert du Motier, marquis de Lafayette (1757–1834), French aristocrat and military officer, general in the American Revolutionary War, and leader of the Garde Nationale during the French Revolution, garrison's officer in Metz in 1775.
- Pierre François Joseph Durutte (1767–1827), French divisional general during the Napoleonic Wars, in charge of the defense of Metz against the Sixth Coalition. As rumor was spreading that Metz surrendered during the siege, Emperor Napoleon asked who was in charge of its defense. When Napoleon knew that General Durutte was in command, he claimed: "Then, Metz is still ours." Indeed, Metz did resist until the abdication of the emperor.
- Michel Ney (1769–1815), Marshal of France, received his military education in the hussar's regiment of Metz.
- Alexis de Tocqueville (1805–1859), French political thinker and historian, lived and studied in Metz between 1817 and 1823.
- François Achille Bazaine (1811–1888), French general who surrendered the city during the Franco-Prussian War, condemned afterward for treachery in negotiating with and capitulating to the enemy.
- Heinrich Göring (1838–1913), German jurist and diplomat, lived in Metz between 1873 and 1885.
- Friedrich Nietzsche (1844–1900), German philosopher who participated to the siege of Metz during the Franco-Prussian War.
- Günther von Kluge (1882–1944), German Generalfeldmarschall, committed suicide near Metz.
- George Smith Patton, Jr. (1885–1945), American general who victoriously led the US Army during the Battle of Metz of the Second World War.
- Robert Schuman (1886–1963), Luxembourgish-born French statesman regarded as one of the founders of the European Union, the Council of Europe, and NATO, member of the municipal council of Metz during the interwar period.
- Joachim von Ribbentrop (1893–1946), Foreign Minister of Germany, lived and studied in Metz between 1904 and 1908.
- Adrienne Thomas (pseudonym for Hertha Adrienne Strauch) (1897–1980), German writer, major representative of humanism and pacifism perspectives in Europe during the interwar period. Born in annexed Moselle, she grew up in Metz and remained attached to the city and her native land, despite the vicissitudes of her life due to the first and second world wars, and the Nazi persecution.
- Jean Moulin (1899–1943), French resistant, died in Metz while on a train in transit towards Germany.
- Valentín González (1904–1983), Spanish Republican military commander during the Spanish Civil War who lived in exile in Metz between 1963 and 1978.
- Jean-Marie Pelt (1933), French botanist, founder of the European Institute for Ecology in Metz and member of the municipal council of Metz from 1971 to 1983.
- Robert Pires (1973), 1998 FIFA World Cup and 2000 UEFA European champion footballer, who played for the FC Metz between 1992 and 1998.
- Aurélie Filippetti (1973), French novelist and politician, elected at the French National Assembly by the constituency of Metz.
