= Battle of Metz =

1944 battle of World War II

- Part of the Lorraine Campaign, World War II
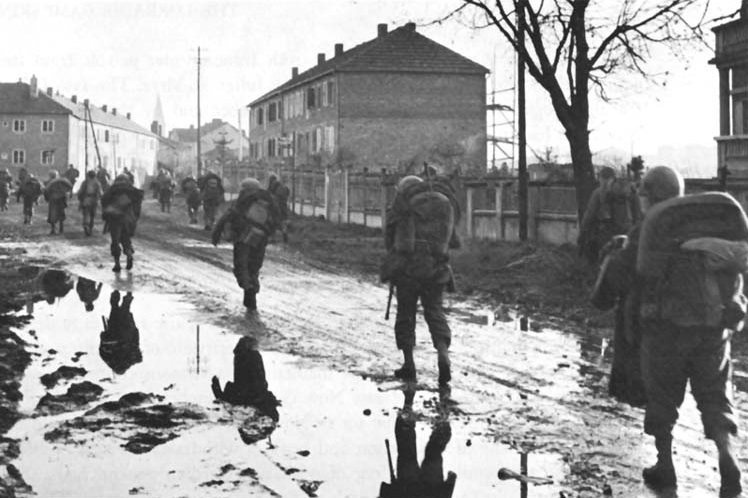
- Troops of the U.S. 5th Infantry Division entering Metz on 18 November 1944.
Date	27 September – 13 December 1944
Location	Metz, Nazi Germany 49°07′13″N 6°10′40″E
Result	American victory
Territorial changes	The US occupy the city of Metz

Belligerents
United States	Germany

Commanders and leaders
George S. Patton	Otto von Knobelsdorff

The Battle of Metz was fought during World War II at the French city of Metz, then part of Nazi Germany, from late September 1944 through mid-December as part of the Lorraine Campaign between the U.S. Third Army commanded by Lieutenant General George Patton and the German Army commanded by General Otto von Knobelsdorff. Strong German resistance resulted in heavy casualties for both sides. The city was captured by U.S. forces and hostilities formally ceased on 22 November; the last of the forts defending Metz surrendered on 13 December.

== Background ==
Located between the rivers Moselle and Seille, the city of Metz had been fortified since the 1880s, when the area became part of the German Empire. Returned to France in 1918, the area retained several forts and observation posts with connecting entrenchments and tunnels. In 1940, the city fell to German forces along with the rest of France and was immediately annexed to the Third Reich. Most of the Nazi dignitaries assumed it was obvious that Metz, where so many German army officers were born, (Note: Admiral Hans Benda (1877–1951), General Arthur Kobus (1879†1945), General Günther Rüdel (1883†1950), General Joachim Degener (1883†1953), General Wilhelm Baur (1883†1964), General Hermann Schaefer (1885†1962), General Bodo Zimmermann (1886†1963), General Walther Kittel (1887†1971), General Hans von Salmuth (1888†1962), General Karl Kriebel (1888†1961), General Arthur von Briesen (1891†1981), General Eugen Müller (1891†1951), General Ernst Schreder (1892†1941), General Ludwig Bieringer (1892†1975), General Edgar Feuchtinger (1894†1960), General Kurt Haseloff (1894†1978), General Hans-Albrecht Lehmann (1894†1976), General Theodor Berkelmann (1894†1943), General Hans Leistikow (1895†1967), General Rudolf Schmundt (1896†1944), General Wilhelm Falley (1897†1944), General Julius von Bernuth (1897†1942), General Johannes Hintz ( 1898 - 1944 ), General Herbert Gundelach (1899†1971), General Joachim-Friedrich Lang (1899†1945), General Heinz Harmel (1906†2000), Erich von Brückner (1896†1949), Helmuth Bode (1907†1985), Johannes Mühlenkamp (1910†1986), Peter-Erich Cremer (1911†1992), Joachim Pötter (1913†1992), Ludwig Weißmüller (1915†1943), Walter Bordellé (1918†1984) among others.) was a German city. The Wehrmacht did not consider it an important location and therefore kept only sparse forces in the city after its conquest, although the fortifications were still heavily defended and well-armed.

In 1944, the Allied "breakout" that followed the Normandy landings saw the U.S. Third Army race 400 miles (640 km) across France. The German forces retreated in disorder, but Third Army supply lines became stretched and gasoline and other materiel became scarce. Supreme Commander General Dwight D. Eisenhower called a halt to the advance so that supplies could be stockpiled for Operation Market Garden, an attempt to break into the German Ruhr Valley in the north. This pause gave the Germans time to reorganize and fortify Metz, in an attempt to contain the Allied advance.

By the end of August 1944, German forces in Lorraine had managed to reestablish a defensive line around Metz and Nancy. According to an order issued by Hitler in March 1944, fortress commanders were to hold their positions at all costs, surrendering only with Hitler's approval, which he would never give. Metz was surrounded by forts built by the Germans between 1870 and 1919, then allowed to decay by the French, who possessed the Lorraine region until it was retaken by Germany in 1940. The German commanders of the Metz forts were required to follow Hitler's "hold at all costs" order when attacked, in September 1944, by the U.S. Third Army led by General George S. Patton, who had reached Verdun before Eisenhower's order to halt the advance and conserve supplies. Hitler understood the pause was due to a supply shortage, and would not last, and he recognized that the Third Army threatened the Saar region of Germany. Hitler ordered his commanders to hold the Allies "as far west as possible," to give time for the strengthening of the West Wall, which had been depleted to build up the Atlantic Wall.

The defense of Metz was undertaken by the German First Army, commanded by General Otto von Knobelsdorff. The number of German troops positioned in the vicinity of Metz was equivalent to four and a half divisions.

== Battle ==
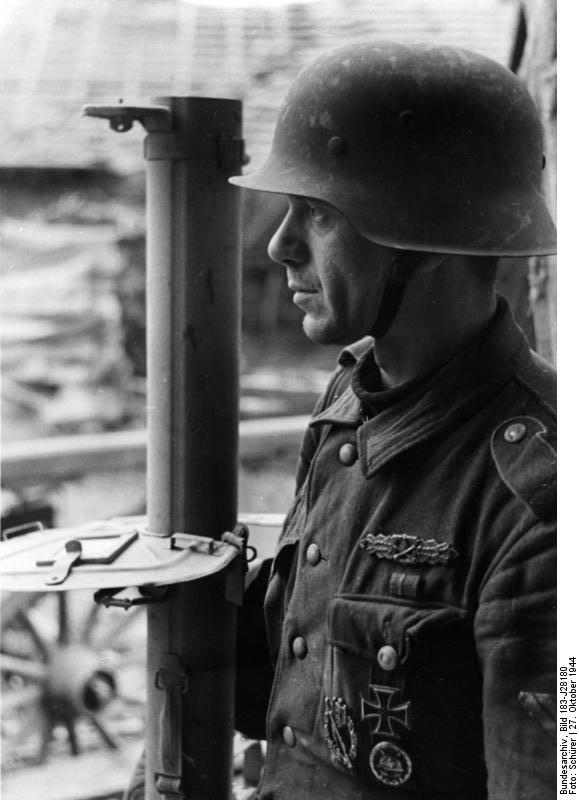
German Grenadier with Panzerschreck, on 27 October 1944, near Metz

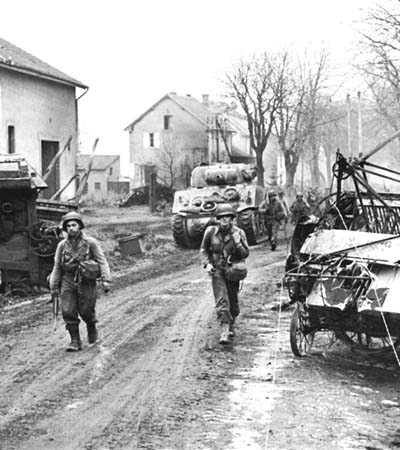
Men of the 378th Infantry, 95th Division enter Metz (17 November 1944).

Armored elements of the United States XX Corps, while on a reconnaissance operation in the direction of the Moselle, made contact with elements from the 17th SS Panzergrenadier Division on 6 September 1944. On 18 September, U.S. reconnaissance units encountered Wehrmacht Panzergrenadiers again. The U.S. forces had not expected the German forces to be in the area, and had to bring together their units that were spread out. Several small scale attacks were made by the U.S. forces after this encounter.

The first U.S. attack was launched by the 95th Infantry Division, in which they attempted to capture a bridgehead to the north of Metz. This attack was repelled by the German forces, as was another attack on the city that followed. In another attack, the US forces captured a small bridgehead across the Moselle to the south of Metz.

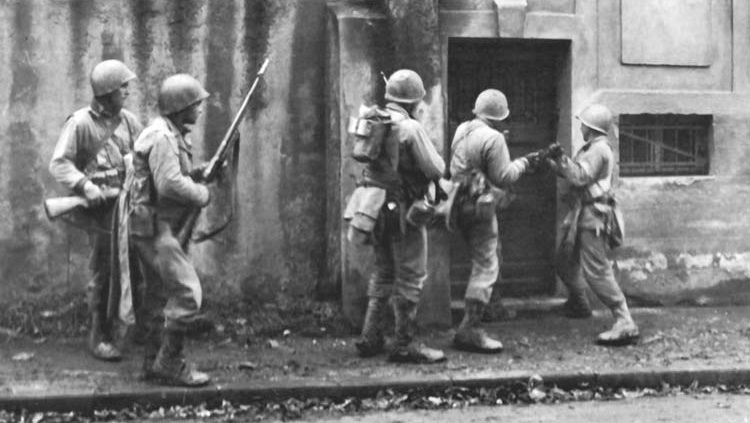
Troops of 95th Infantry Division conducting a house-to-house search in Metz on 19 November 1944

By the end of September, German forces positioned to the north had moved to the southern area of Metz. Some troops were also withdrawn from Metz. After this development, the XII Corps launched another attack but was countered by the German defenders. In the following two weeks, the U.S. forces limited themselves to small scale attacks and patrolling in the Metz area. During this time, the XX Corps underwent a training program, experimenting with methods of reducing the defenses of the fortress. By this time, the U.S. command had decided to attack Metz from its rear, coming from the east.

On 3 November a new attack was launched by the U.S. forces, which resulted in the capture of the outer defenses with the aid of the tactics developed during the training process. On 14 November Generalleutnant Heinrich Kittel was appointed as the new commander of the German forces. By 17 November, U.S. forces had managed to isolate most of the forts, and were attacking the city. German forces had been retreating since 17 November, and U.S. forces pursued them for the following two days. U.S. forces entered Metz on 18 November, and on 21 November Kittel was wounded and subsequently captured. Although the city itself was captured by U.S. forces and hostilities formally ceased on 22 November, the remaining isolated forts continued to hold out.

Direct assault was forbidden against the holdout forts in order to preserve artillery ammunition for the XX Corps' advance to the Sarre River and the isolated forts subsequently surrendered one by one following the surrender of Fort Verdun on 26 November. By the end of November, several forts were still holding out. The last of the forts at Metz to surrender was Fort Jeanne d'Arc, which capitulated to the U.S. III Corps on 13 December.

== Aftermath ==
Although the battle resulted in defeat for the German forces, it served the intended purpose of the German command of halting the advance of the U.S. Third Army for three months, enabling retreating German forces to make an organized withdrawal to the Sarre river and to organize their defenses. The level of casualties for both sides is unknown but high.

The Germans were surprised at the American approach on the battlefield. Generaloberst Johannes Blaskowitz, C.O of Armeegruppe G, reviewed Patton's decision to launch a headlong attack straight into the fortifications of Metz by saying:

- "A direct attack on Metz was unnecessary....in contrast a swerve northward in the direction of Luxemburg and Bitburg would have met with greater success and caused our 1st Army's right flank collapse followed by the breakdown of our 7th Army."

The military strategist and historian Liddel Hart remarked:

- "Patton's 3rd Army began to cross the Moselle as early as 5 September, yet was little farther forward 2 weeks later - or indeed two months later."

== Notes ==
Footnotes
