= Hans Leistikow =

Hans Leistikow may refer to:

- Hans Leistikow (artist) (1892–1962), German artist
- Hans Leistikow (general) (1895–1967), German general during the Second World War

== See also ==
- Leistikow
