= Hans Albrecht =

Hans Albrecht may ref to:

- Hans Albrecht (musicologist) (1902–1961), German musicologist
- Hans Albrecht (politician) (1919–2008), German politician
- Hans Albrecht (sport shooter) (1924–1981), Swiss sports shooter
- Hans Albrecht, Hereditary Prince of Schleswig-Holstein (1917–1944), Hereditary Prince of Schleswig-Holstein

== See also ==
- Hans Albrecht von Barfus (1635–1704), Prussian field marshall
- Hans-Albrecht Lehmann (1894–1976), German general during World War II
