= Falkowski =

Falkowski/ Fałkowski (feminine: Falkowska / Fałkowska) is a Polish toponymic surname derived from any places named Falki, Falkowa, Falkowice, Falków, etc. May refer to:

- Andrzej Fałkowski (born 1959), Polish army officer
- Antoni Fałkowski, Polish diplomat, former ambassador to Denmark
- Czesław Falkowski (1887–1969), Roman Catholic bishop of the Diocese of Łomża
- Jadwiga Falkowska (1889–1944), Polish teacher
- Jan Falkowski (1912–2001), Polish fighter ace
- Kurt von Falkowski (1886–1953), Generalmajor in the Luftwaffe
- Lucyna Mirosława Falkowska, Polish scientist and oceanographer
- Maciej Fałkowski, Polish diplomat, former ambassador to Iran
- Paul Falkowski (born 1951), American biological oceanographer
- Ronald Falkoski (born 2003), Brazilian professional footballer
- Weronika Falkowska (born 2000), Polish tennis player
