= Leistikow =

Leistikow is a surname. Notable people with the surname include:

- Gertrud Leistikow (1885–1948), German dancer and choreographer
- Hans Leistikow (artist) (1892-1962), German artist
- Hans Leistikow (general) (1895–1967), German general during the Second World War
- Logan Leistikow (born 1984), American filmmaker
- Walter Leistikow (1865–1908), German artist, painter, etcher and writer
