= Hans Lehmann =

Hans Lehmann may refer to:

- Hans G. Lehmann (born 1939), German photographer
- Hans Ulrich Lehmann (1937–2013), Swiss composer.
- Hans Lehmann (officer), German naval officer during World War II

== See also ==
- Hans-Albrecht Lehmann (1894–1976), German general
- Hans-Peter Lehmann (1934–2025), German opera and artistic director
