= Otto Krueger =

Otto Krueger may refer to:

- Otto Krueger (politician) (1890–1963), North Dakota politician
- Otto Krueger (baseball) (1876–1961), Major League Baseball player
- Otto Krueger (general) (1891–1976), Luftwaffe general

== See also ==
- Otto Kruger (1885–1974), American actor
