= General Kittell =

General Kittel may refer to:

- Friedrich Kittel (1896–1973), German Wehrmacht lieutenant general
- Heinrich Kittel (1892–1969), German Wehrmacht lieutenant general
- Walther Kittel (1887–1971), German lieutenant general of medical services
