= General Kruger =

General Kruger, Krüger, or Krueger may refer to:

- Friedrich-Wilhelm Krüger (1894–1945), German Army general
- Otto Krueger (general) (1891–1976), German Luftwaffe major general
- Paul Kruger (1825–1904), South African commandant-general
- Walter Krueger (1881–1967), U.S. Army general
- Walter Krüger (SS general) (1890–1945), German SS general
- Walter Krüger (Wehrmacht general) (1892–1973), German Wehrmacht general
