= Replacement Army =

Former part of the German Army

The Replacement Army (German: Ersatzheer) was part of the Imperial German Army during World War I and part of the Wehrmacht during World War II. It was based within Germany proper and included command and administrative units as well as training and guard troops. Its primary role was to provide replacements for the combat divisions of the regular army.

== Third Reich ==
It was formed in the various German military districts (Wehrkreise) and was tasked with the conscription, recruitment, training and replacement of personnel, testing of new military equipment, and administration such as responsibility for soldiers on home leave.

The Ersatzheer contingency plans for Operation Valkyrie were deliberately misused as part of the unsuccessful 20 July plot to assassinate Adolf Hitler, arrest SS troops, and stage a military coup d'etat through the organization driven by the newly appointed Chief of Staff, Claus von Stauffenberg, in early 1944. Its commander, Generaloberst Friedrich Fromm, had enough power to control the German state because his position controlled the army's procurement and production and the command of all army troops in Germany. Fromm had refused to cooperate in an earlier coup, Operation Spark, but the planners in 1944 still planned to use the Replacement Army. Heinrich Himmler personally took over control of the Replacement Army because of its potential to be used in another assassination attempt.

=== Leadership ===
Commanders

No.	Portrait	Commander	Took office	Left office	Time in office	Defence branch
1	Joachim von Stülpnagel [de]	General der Infanterie zur Verwendung; Joachim von Stülpnagel (1880–1968)	26 August 1939	31 August 1939	5 days	German Army
2	Friedrich Fromm	Generaloberst; Friedrich Fromm (1888–1945)	1 September 1939	20 July 1944	4 years, 323 days	German Army
3	Heinrich Himmler	Reichsführer-SS; Heinrich Himmler (1900–1945)	21 July 1944	29 April 1945	282 days	Schutzstaffel

Chief of Staff

No.	Portrait	Chief of Staff	Took office	Left office	Time in office	Defence branch
1	Kurt Haseloff	Oberst; Kurt Haseloff (1894–1978)	15 February 1940	1 March 1941	1 year, 14 days	German Army
2	Claus von Stauffenberg	Oberst; Claus von Stauffenberg (1907–1944)	1 July 1944	20 July 1944	20 days	German Army
2	Hans Jüttner	SS-Obergruppenführer; Hans Jüttner (1894–1965)	21 July 1944	29 April 1945	282 days	Schutzstaffel
