= Alphonse Boilly =

French engraver and lithographer

Alphonse Léopold Boilly (3 Mai 1801 in Paris – 8 December 1867 id., Petit-Montrouge) was a French engraver and lithographer.

Boilly was a son of the artist Louis-Léopold Boilly (1761–1845). He was a student of Alexandre Tardieu and François Forster.

His brothers Édouard Boilly (1799–1854) and Julien-Léopold Boilly (1796–1874) were also active as artists.

== Bibliography ==
- Émile Bellier de la Chavignerie, Louis Auvray: Dictionnaire général des artistes de l’école française depuis l’origine des arts du dessin jusqu’à nos jours. Bd. 1, Renouard, Paris 1882, p. 109 (Digitalisat).
- Henri Beraldi: Les Graveurs du XIXe siècle. Bd. 2, Conquet, Paris 1885, p. 148 (Digitalisat).
