= Maximilien Simon =

French composer

Maximilien-Charles Simon (8 March 1797 – 20 September 1861) was a French composer.

== Life ==
Simon was born on 19 ventôse of the Vth year (8 March 1797) in Metz, (Moselle). He studied at the Conservatoire de Paris, where he was a pupil of Gossec, Méhul and Cherubini in composition and Berton in harmony. With the cantata Pyrame et Thisbé, based on a text by J. A. Vinaty, he won the Second Prix de Rome in 1823, after Édouard Boilly and Louis Constant Ermel.

But he didn't have a musical career. He became a postal inspector in the department of Seine. In this capacity, he was made a Knight of the Imperial Order of the Legion of Honour by decree of 16 August 1860. The certificate was presented to him on 8 September of the year by State Councillor Auguste Stourm, General Director of the Swiss Post.
