= Hans Albrecht (sport shooter) =

Swiss sport shooter (1924–1981)

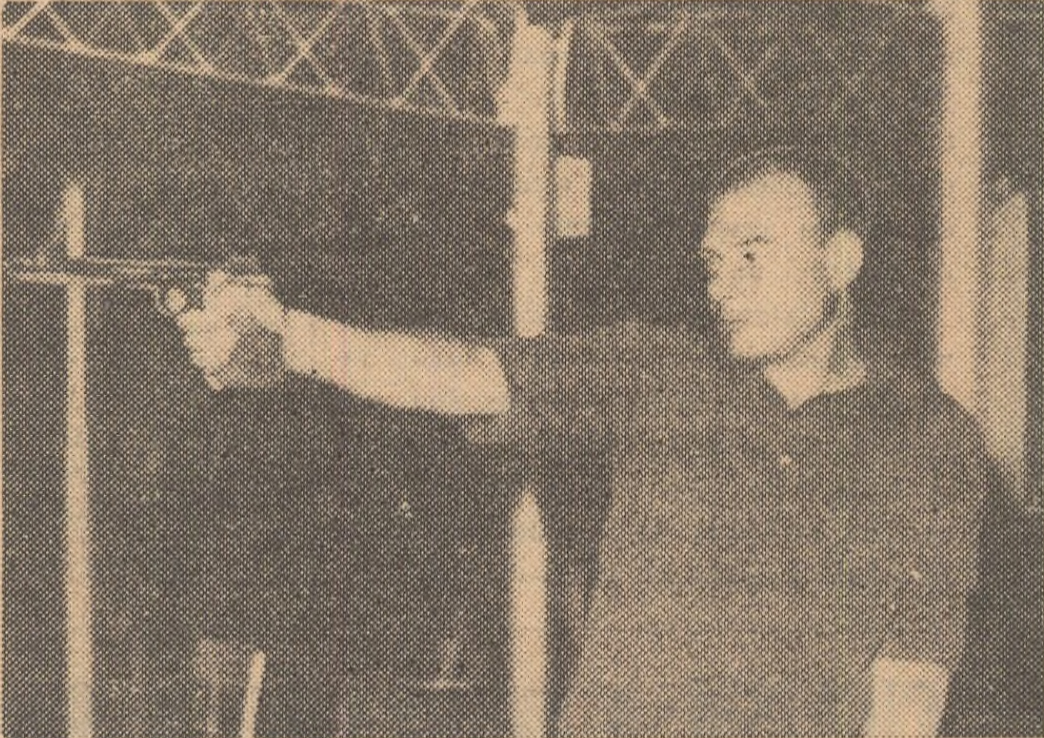

Personal information
- Born: 7 September 1924 Stadel, Switzerland
- Died: 12 December 1981 (aged 57) Switzerland

Sport
- Sport: Sports shooting

Hans Albrecht (7 September 1924 – 12 December 1981) was a Swiss sports shooter. He competed at the 1960 Summer Olympics and the 1964 Summer Olympics. Albrecht died in Switzerland on 12 December 1981, at the age of 57.
