= Maciej Fałkowski =

Polish diplomat

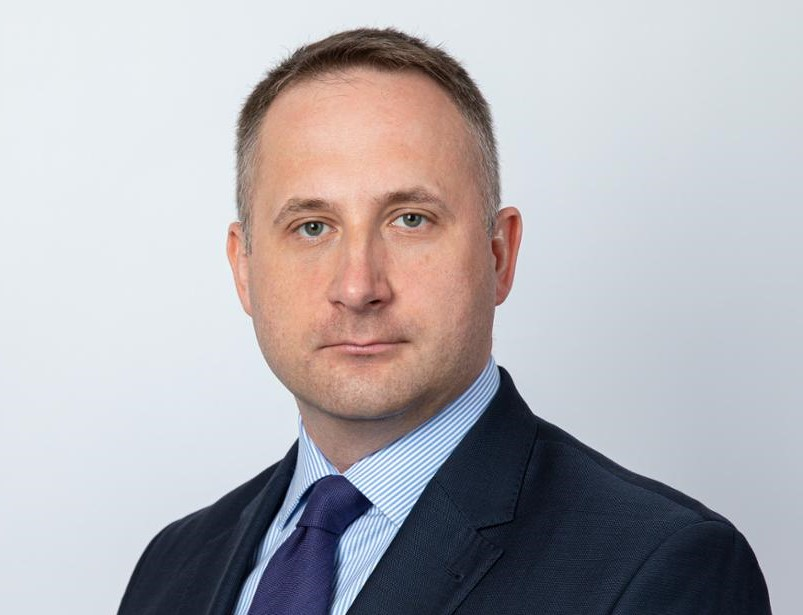

Poland Ambassador to Iran
- In office 8 June 2019 – July 2024
- Preceded by: Jarosław Domański
- Succeeded by: Marcin Wilczek

Personal details
- Children: 1
- Education: Catholic University of Lublin
- Profession: Diplomat

Maciej Fałkowski is a Polish diplomat, an ambassador to Iran (2019–2024).

== Life ==
Maciej Fałkowski holds an M.A. in law from the Catholic University of Lublin. He has been studying also ADR at the Toronto University (2007), Executive MBA the Warsaw University of Technology (2009), and PhD studies the Warsaw School of Economics (2013).

In 1998, Fałkowski joined the Ministry of Foreign Affairs. He has been working at the embassy in Oslo and representative to the United Nations in Vienna. He was an expert and the head of the unit for export controls and conventional disarmament at the Security Policy Department. Between 2003 and 2007 he served as a consular officer in Toronto. In 2013–2014 he was a deputy director of the Asia Pacific Department. From 2015 to 2019 he was the deputy director and director of the Economic Cooperation Department. In 2018, he became a member of Advisory Council to the Polish Space Agency. Since 8 June 2019 he is representing Poland as an ambassador to Iran. He presented his credentials to the president Hassan Rouhani on 17 June 2019. He ended his mission in July 2024. In March 2026, he took the post of director of the MFA Department for Africa, the Middle East, and Latin America.

Beside Polish, he speaks English, German, and French. He is married, with a child.
