= Ernst Wieblitz =

German Naval Officer

Wieblitz Ernst
- Born: 2 August 1883; Metz
- Died: 3 January 1973 (aged 89); Kassel
- Military career
- Allegiance: German Empire; Weimar Republic
- Branch: Imperial German Navy; Reichsmarine
- Service years: 1901–1920
- Rank: Kapitänleutnant (1912); Korvettenkapitän (1920)
- Conflicts: Battle of the Falkland Islands
- Awards: Iron Cross

Wieblitz Ernst (1883–1973) was a German naval officer during World War I. He was navigation officer on the SMS Dresden on the day of the scuttling.

== Biography ==
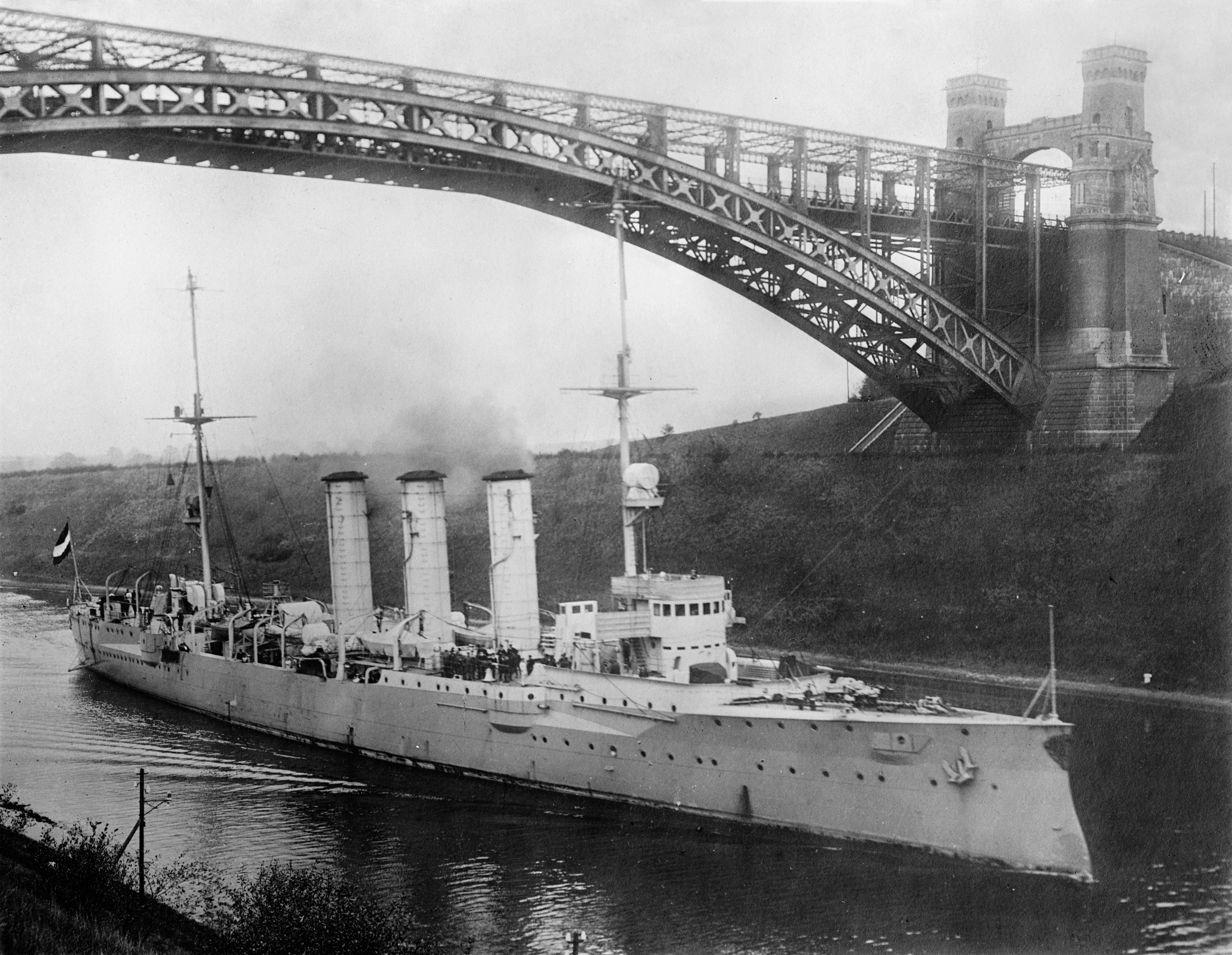
SMS Dresden (transiting Kiel Canal)

Ernst Wieblitz was born in Metz, Lorraine, one of the strongest fortress of the German Empire. He was the son of a military doctor. In 1901, aged eighteen, Wieblitz joined the Kaiserliche Marine. He began his training on the training ship Charlotte sailing from the Baltic Sea to the Mediterranean Sea. After the Naval Academy at Kiel, Wieblitz served as a "Leutnant zu See" on the SMS Fürst Bismarck, the first German armored cruiser. Promoted to "Oberleutnant" in April 1907, he served as a navigation officer on the gunboat SMS Luchs from 1910 to 1912. In September 1912, Ernst Wieblitz was promoted to Kapitänleutnant on the SMS Königsberg, then served on the SMS Moltke, the lead ship of the Moltke-class battlecruisers of the German Imperial Navy. In December 1913, Wieblitz was assigned on the SMS Dresden, a light cruiser commanded by Captain Koehler.

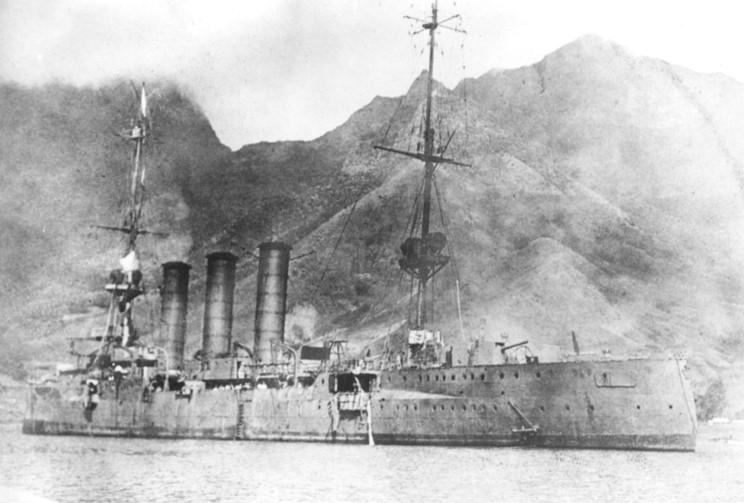
SMS Dresden, flying a white flag, moments prior to her scuttling

By the outbreak of World War I, Ernst Wieblitz was still serving on board the SMS Dresden as navigation officer. This cruiser was the only ship that managed to evade the British Fleet for a prolonged period during the Battle of the Falkland Islands in December 1914, largely due to his excellent deception tactics. Whilst anchored in Cumberland Bay, Robinson Crusoe Island, the Dresden was trapped and forced to scuttle after fighting a battle there with the British. Wounded during the battle, Wieblitz was taken prisoner and confined at Valparaíso, in Chile in March 1915. Unlike Wilhelm Canaris, who managed to escape in August 1915, Wieblitz stayed prisoner until the end of the war. He was awarded the Iron Cross first class on September 23, 1919.
