= Friedrich Fromm =

German general (1888–1945)

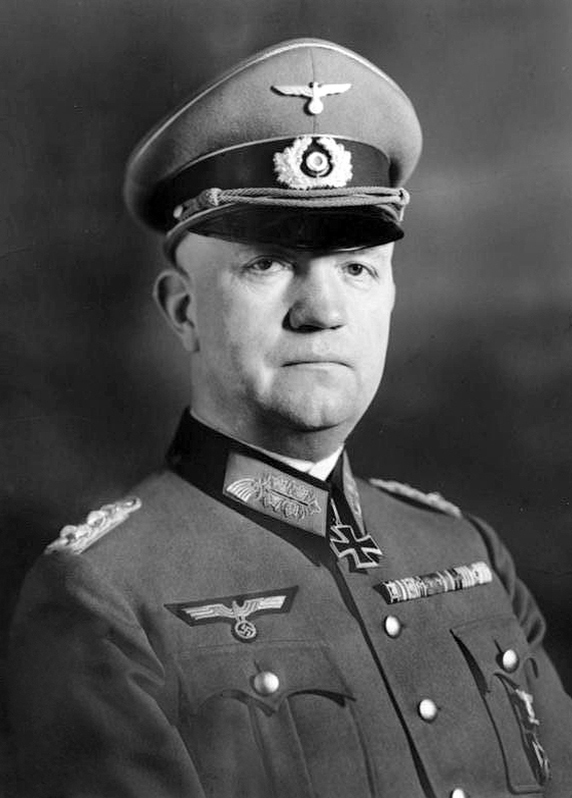
- Fromm in 1940

Chief of Army Equipment and Commander of the Replacement Army
- In office 1 September 1939 – 22 July 1944
- Preceded by: Joachim von Stülpnagel
- Succeeded by: Heinrich Himmler

Personal details
- Born: 8 October 1888 Berlin, Kingdom of Prussia, German Empire
- Died: 12 March 1945 (aged 56) Brandenburg-Görden Prison, Free State of Prussia, Nazi Germany
- Cause of death: Execution by firing squad
- Children: Helga Heinke

Military service
- Allegiance: German Empire; Weimar Republic; Nazi Germany
- Branch/service: German Army
- Rank: Generaloberst
- Battles/wars: World War I; World War II
- Awards: Knight's Cross of the Iron Cross

Generaloberst Friedrich Wilhelm Waldemar Fromm (8 October 1888 – 12 March 1945) was a German Army officer. In World War II, Fromm was Commander in Chief of the Replacement Army (Ersatzheer), in charge of training and personnel replacement for combat divisions of the German Army, a position he occupied for most of the war. He was executed for failing to act against the plot of 20 July 1944 to assassinate Adolf Hitler.

== Early life ==
Fromm was born in Charlottenburg. He served as a Prussian Army officer during World War I.

== Head of the Reserve Army ==
In 1939, Fromm became Chief of Army Equipment and commander of the Replacement Army.

When Operation Barbarossa stalled outside of Moscow in December 1941 and the Russian counter-attack started, Hitler took direct command of the Army and re-organized the armed forces' command structure. The Office of the Chief of Army Armament and the Reserve Army under Generaloberst Friedrich Fromm was created, subordinate to the commander in chief, army (head of the OKH, Hitler). Fromm had enough power at his disposal to control the German state because his position controlled army procurement and production and commanded all army troops inside Germany.

At the beginning of 1942, Fromm apparently recommended a defensive strategy for the entire year because of exhausted army stockpiles and the diversion of production, after the initial successes of Barbarossa in the summer of 1941.

== 20 July plot ==
In World War II, Fromm was Commander in Chief of the Reserve Army (Ersatzheer), in charge of training and personnel replacement for the German Army, a position he occupied for most of the war. Fromm was aware that some of his subordinates, most notably his chief of staff, Oberst Claus Schenk Graf von Stauffenberg, were planning an assassination attempt against Adolf Hitler. He remained quiet and agreed to have a part in it, if he became a top official of the new government after the mutiny. When the attempt to proceed with the mutiny on July 15 failed, he refused to have any further part in it.

On 20 July, news broke that Hitler and several officers of the Supreme Command of the Armed Forces had become victims of an explosion in the German military's headquarters on the Eastern Front, the Wolfsschanze (Wolf's Lair), near Rastenburg, East Prussia (now Kętrzyn, Poland). Fromm concluded that it was Graf von Stauffenberg and the plotters who were behind the explosion and, upon being informed over the phone by Field Marshal Wilhelm Keitel that Hitler had survived the bomb, attempted to arrest them as they were initiating Operation Valkyrie (they had forged Fromm's signature to begin the operation). However, he was quickly overwhelmed and confined to a prison cell in the Bendlerblock, the Berlin headquarters of the Replacement Army, among other branches of the Wehrmacht.

After the coup failed, Fromm was found by men of the Ersatzheer and freed. Despite protests from Otto Ernst Remer who had direct orders from Hitler to take the conspirators alive, Fromm held a summary court-martial of the active soldiers at his headquarters who had been identified or suspected of being part of the coup. As presiding official, Fromm condemned the officers to death and ordered their immediate execution by firing squad. As for retired Colonel-General Ludwig Beck, Fromm allowed his request to kill himself, but since he survived the suicide attempt, Fromm ordered him to be shot.

== Arrest, trial and execution ==
After the Bendlerblock executions, Generaloberst Fromm went to Joseph Goebbels to claim credit for suppressing the coup, to which Goebbels only said: "You have been in a damn hurry to get your witnesses below ground." On the morning of 22 July 1944, Fromm and other members of the conspiracy were arrested. Since the court, presided over by Judge Roland Freisler, failed to prove a direct association with the 20 July plotters, but his knowledge of the conspiracy plan was proven, which he never warned the high Nazi leaders about, he was instead charged and convicted for cowardice before the enemy. However, because he had executed the conspirators within reach, he was spared torture and execution by hanging with a thin rope and sentenced to a military execution.

On 12 March 1945, Fromm was executed at the Brandenburg-Görden Prison by firing squad as part of the post-conspiracy purge by Hitler's direct order. His last words before the firing squad were reported to be: "I die, because it was ordered. I had always wanted only the best for Germany."

== Awards ==
- Iron Cross (1914)
  - 2nd Class
  - 1st Class
- Wound Badge (1914)
  - in Black
- Hanseatic Cross of Hamburg
- Honour Cross of the World War 1914/1918
- Anschluss Medal
- Sudetenland Medal with Prague Castle Bar
- Memel Medal
- Clasp to the Iron Cross (1939)
  - 2nd Class
  - 1st Class
- Knight's Cross of the Iron Cross on 6 July 1940 as General der Artillerie and chief of the Heeresrüstung (armament of the army) and commander in chief of the Ersatzheeres (replacement army)
- Grand Cross of the Order of the White Rose of Finland (1941)
  - With Swords (1942)

== In popular culture ==
- In the 2008 film Valkyrie he is portrayed by Tom Wilkinson.
