= Ferdinand von Parseval =

Bavarian general

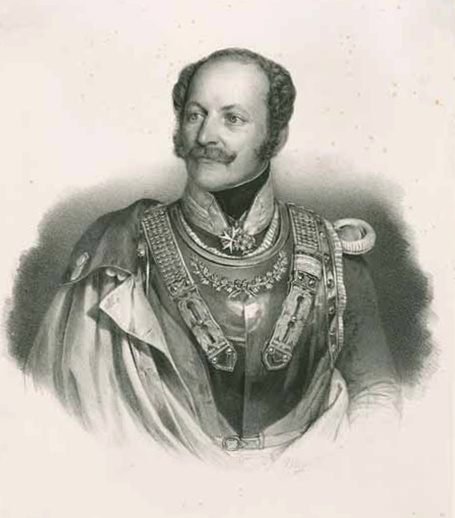
Ferdinand von Parseval

Ferdinand von Parseval (1791–1854) was a Bavarian General.

== Biography ==
Son of Philbert Marie César de Parseval (1765–1796), an artillery captain in garrison in Metz, Ferdinand Alexandre Louis de Parseval was born on 27 February 1791. Following the example of his father, Ferdinand von Parseval became Officer of Friedrich Wilhelm, King of Prussia.

Married in Paris in 1821 with Fanny O'Hegerty, an Irish subject, Ferdinand von Parseval died on 13 November 1854, in Erlangen, Bavaria.

Soon later, Ferdinand von Parseval entered the service of King Maximilian I of Bavaria. First, Parseval was assigned to the 1st Regiment of Uhlans. Then, in 1819, he was assigned to the third regiment of Bavarian Chevau-léger. He was promoted Major in 1827. Promoted Oberstlieutenantin 1841, Parseval was transferred to the 2nd Infantry Regiment, and then to the 3rd Infantry Regiment Prinz Karl. After a certain while, Ferdinand von Parseval served in the 1st regiment of Cuirassiers 'Karl Prinz von Bayern', where he was promoted to the rank of Oberst in 1842. Ferdinand von Parseval was promoted to the rank of Generalmajor und Brigadier der Kavalleriein 1848. Ferdinand von Parseval kept this command until the end of his career. He became a pensioner in 1852.

== Distinctions ==
- Russian Empire: Cross of Order of Saint Stanislaus (1838)
- Prussia: Commander of the Order of the Red Eagle
