= Walter Leistikow =

German painter

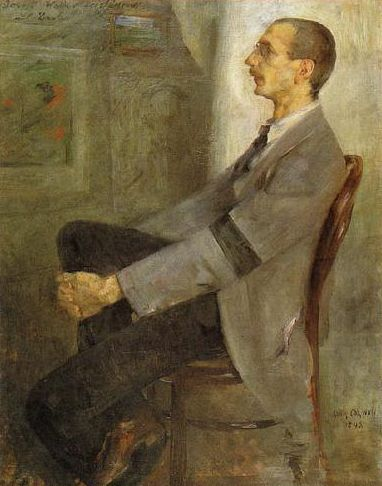
- Walter Leistikow, portrait by Lovis Corinth, 1893
- Born: Walter Rudolf Leistikow; 25 October 1865; Bromberg, Province of Posen, Kingdom of Prussia (now Bydgoszcz, Poland)
- Died: 24 July 1908 (aged 42); Berlin, German Empire
- Education: Hermann Eschke, Hans Fredrik Gude
- Movement: Berlin Secession

Walter Rudolf Leistikow (1865–1908) was a German landscape painter, graphic artist, designer and art critic.

== Biography ==
His father was a pharmacist who owned a Kräuterlikör manufacturing plant in Kujawien that provided much of the family's income, whilst Walter's nephew Hans became an artist and graphic designer. In 1883, aged seventeen, he moved to Berlin to attend the Prussian Academy of Art, but after barely one year, he was dismissed by Anton von Werner for lack of talent. He then took private lessons from Hermann Eschke and Hans Gude from 1885 to 1887.

Leistikow's first exhibition was at the Berliner Salon in 1886 and, in 1892 he became a member of an artists' association known as Die-XI (Vereinigung der XI), which was opposed to the teaching methods at the Academy. From 1892 to 1895, he taught at the private academy, Akademie Fehr, run by artist Conrad Fehr and located on Lützowstrasse 82 in Berlin. He also designed furniture, carpets and wallpapers. In 1902, he was chosen to create trading cards for the Stollwerck chocolate company of Cologne and produced a series of German landscapes.

For a time, Leistikow tried to become a writer, publishing a novella called Seine Cousine (1893) in the Freie Bühne and a novel, Auf der Schwelle (1896), but they received little attention. To make matters worse, Kaiser Wilhelm II despised his pictures and was quoted as saying "er hat mir den ganzen Grunewald versaut" (he has ruined the entire Grunewald for me).

In 1894, he married Anna Mohr (1863–1950), a merchant's daughter from Copenhagen. In 1903, he was one of the co-founders of the Deutscher Künstlerbund.

By 1908, Leistikow was dying from the agonizing effects of advanced-stage syphilis. He committed suicide by shooting himself while staying at the Sanatorium Hubertus on the Schlachtensee. Shortly after, a street in Berlin's Westend district was named after him. In 1920, a street in the Mahlsdorf district was named after him as well. He was later given an ehrengrab at the cemetery in Steglitz. A commemorative stamp was issued in 1972, with one of his paintings of the Schlachtensee.

== Selected paintings ==
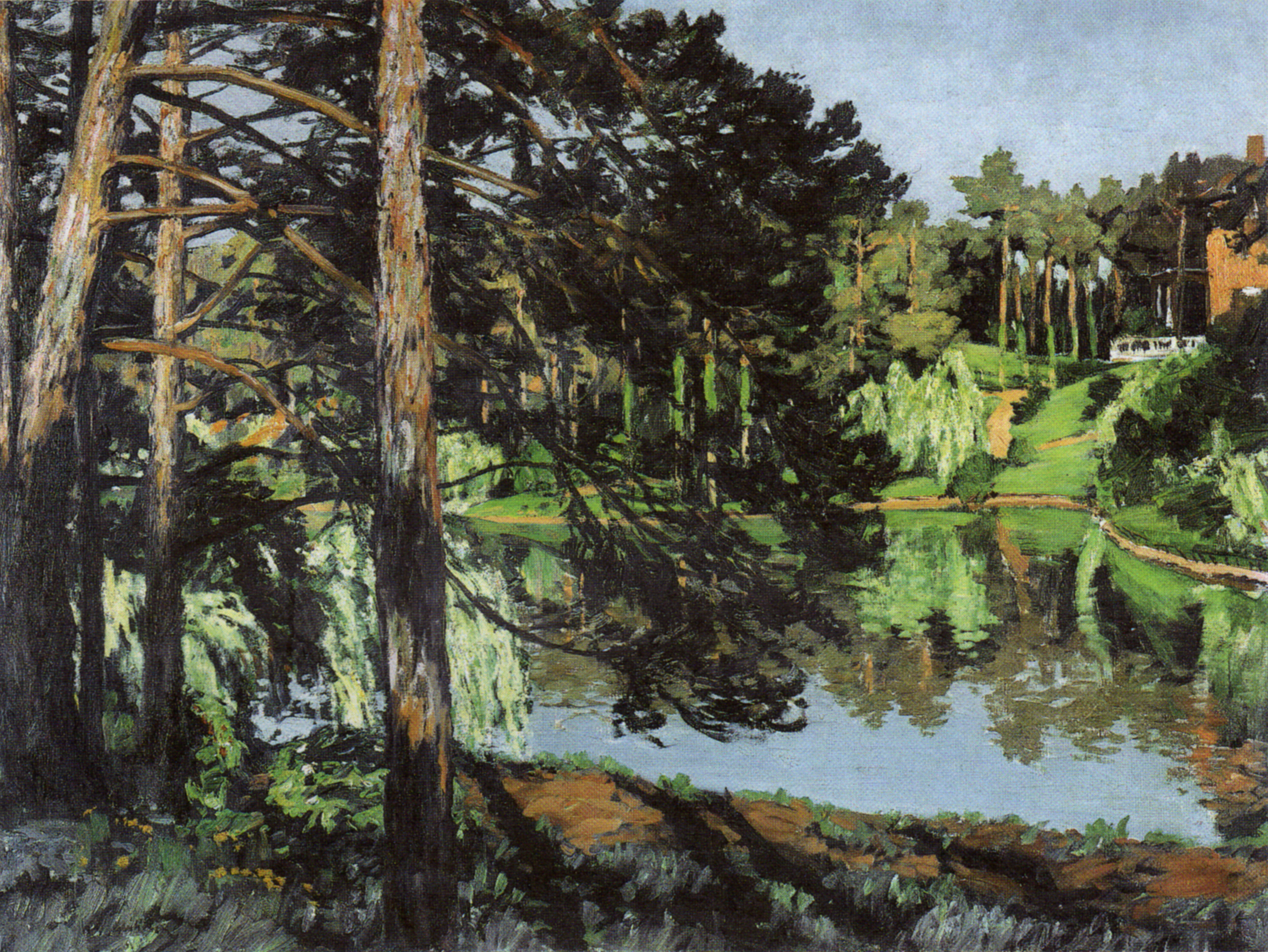
In the Grunewald

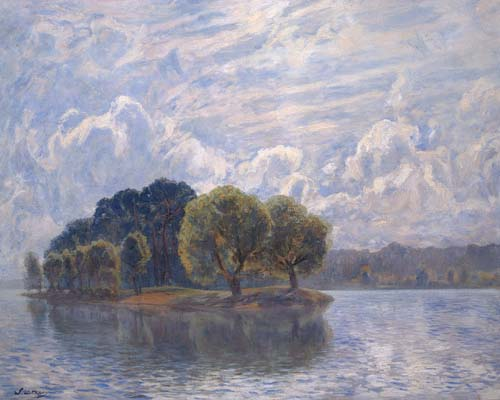
Liebesinsel, Havel

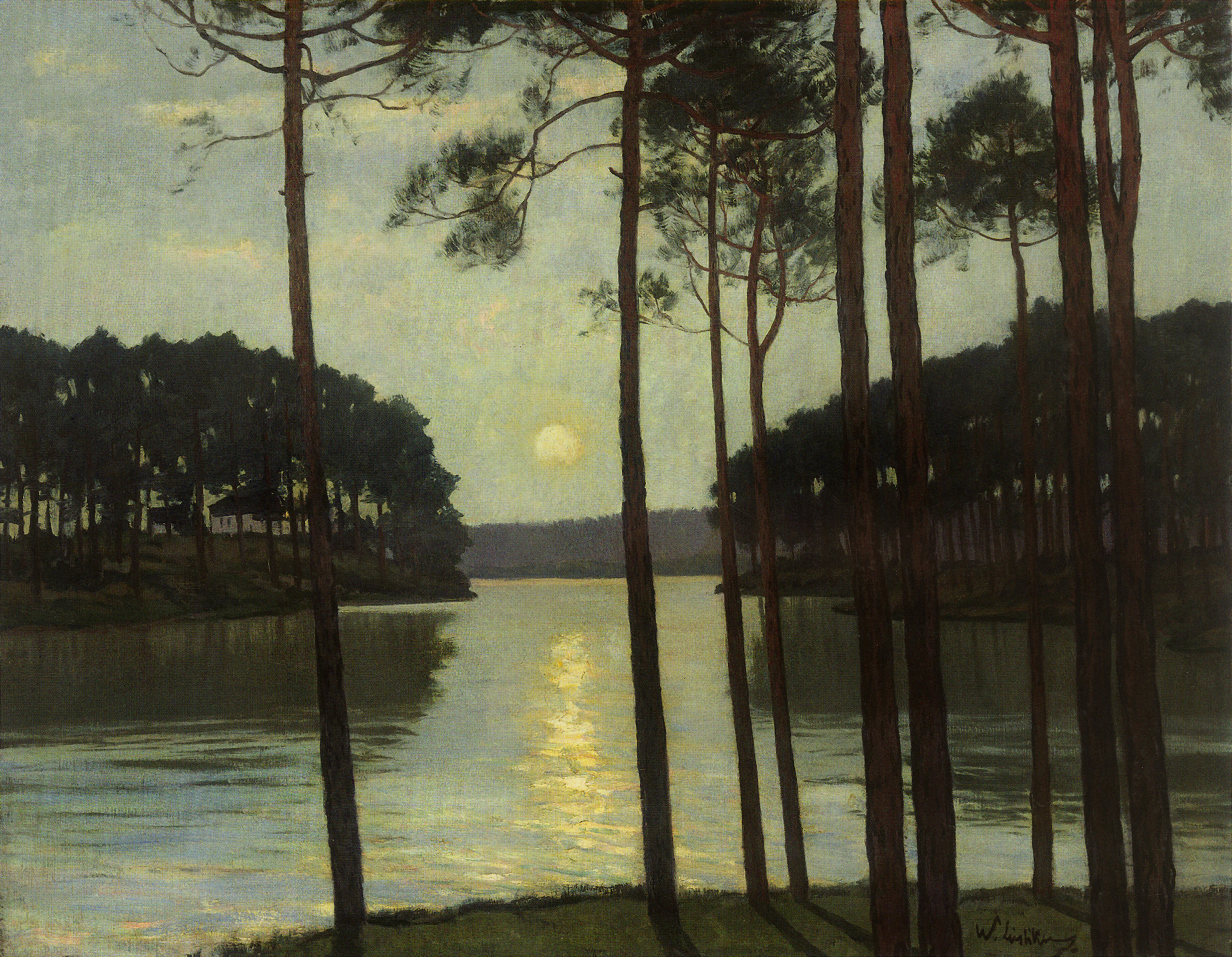
Evening Mood on the Schlachtensee

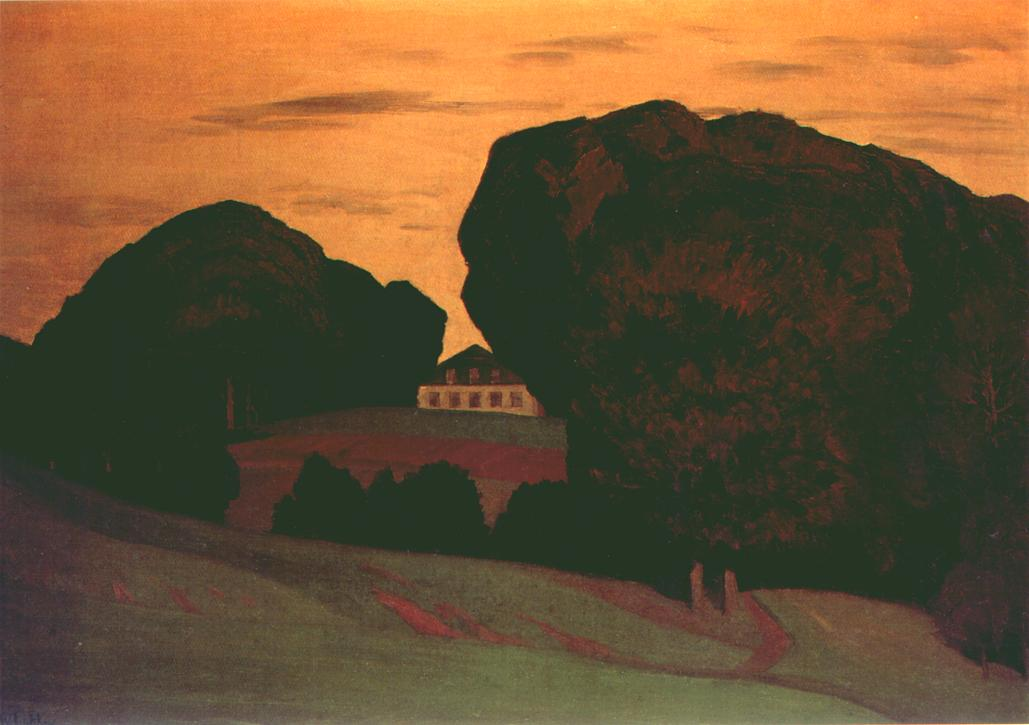
House in Denmark
