= Joseph Décembre =

Joseph Décembre, dit Décembre-Allonier (1836, Metz – 1906) was a 19th-century French writer, historiographer and freemason.

He was the author of a number of treatises or dictionaries, published in collaboration with his stepfather Edmond Allonier (1828–1871) under the collective name "Décembre-Allonier" and often confused with a single person.

== Works ==
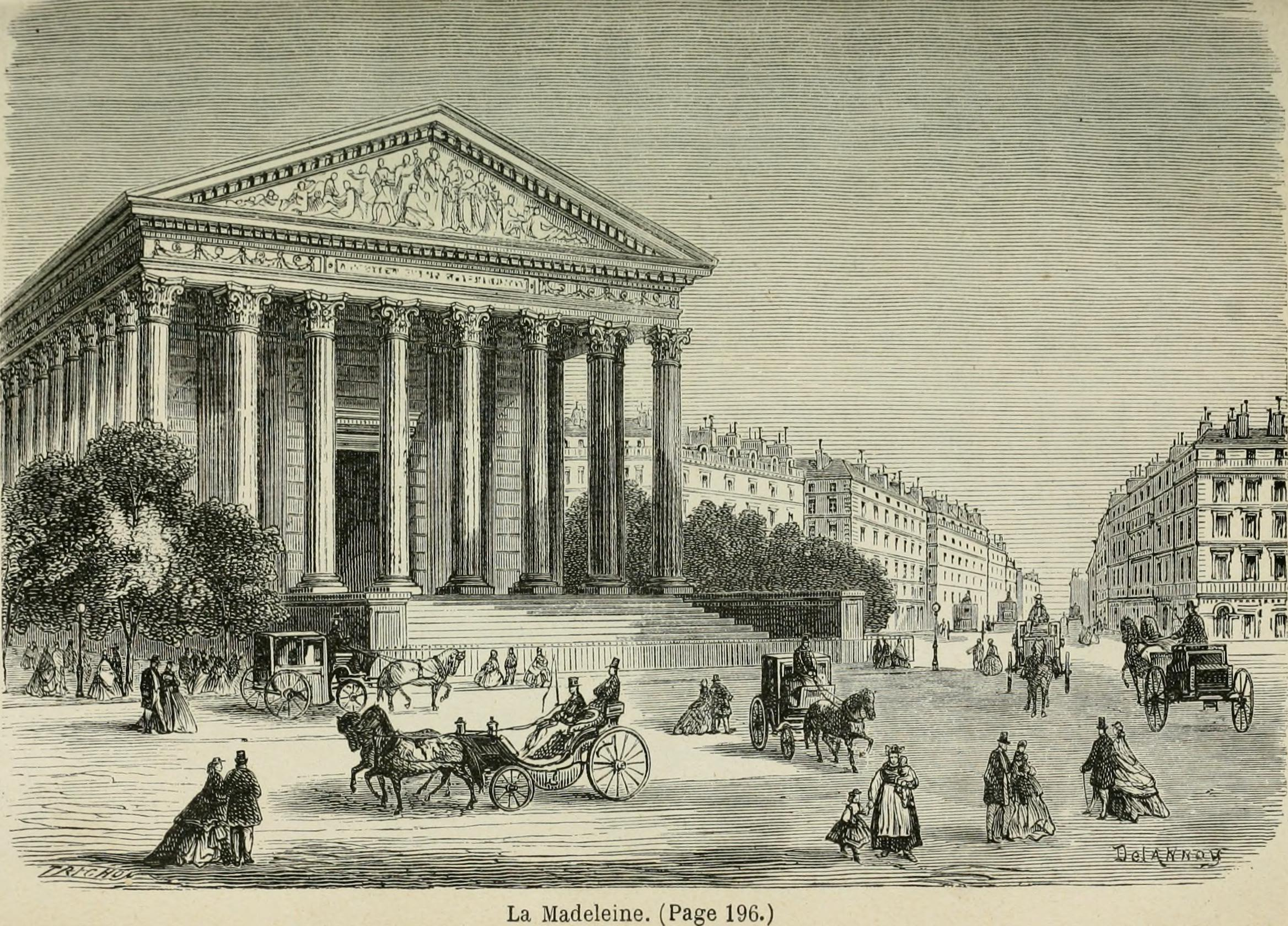
Les merveilles du nouveau Paris (1867)

- 1862: La Bohème littéraire
- 1863: Ce qu'il y a derrière un testament
- 1864: Typographie et gens de lettres
- Journal général de l'imprimerie et de la librairie
- 1864: Dictionnaire populaire illustré d'histoire, de géographie, de biographie, de technologie, de mythologie, d'antiquités, des beaux-arts et de littérature
- 1866–1868: Dictionnaire de la Révolution française, 1789–1799
- 1867: Les merveilles du nouveau Paris
- 1869: Histoire des conseils de guerre de 1852
- 1868: Le coup d'état du 2 décembre 1851

== Bibliography ==
- Ligou, Daniel (1987). Dictionnaire de la franc-maçonnerie. PUF. ISBN 2130486398. Ligou1998.
- Gisèle Hivert-Messeca; Yves Hivert-Messeca (1997). Comment la Franc-Maçonnerie vint aux femmes : Deux siècles de Franc-Maçonnerie d'adoption, féminine et mixte en France 1740-1940. Éditions Dervy. ISBN 2850769401.
- André Combes (1999). Histoire de la Franc-Maçonnerie au XIX. Éditions du Rocher.
- Viera Rebolledo-Dhuin, La librairie et le crédit. Réseaux et métiers du livre à Paris (1830–1870), thèse de doctorat d'histoire, volume I, 2011.
