= Laurent de Chazelles =

French agronomist

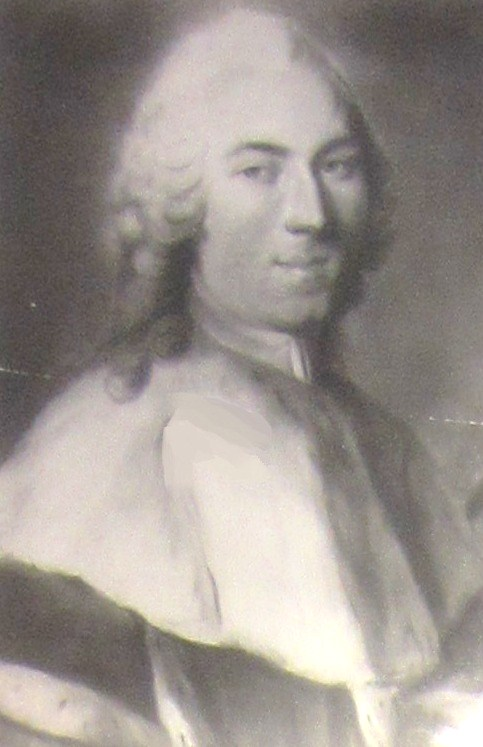
- Born: 24 July 1724; Metz, France
- Died: 28 May 1808 (aged 83); Metz, France
- Occupations: Magistrate, horticulturist and agronomist
- Title: Chairperson of Moselle General Council
- Term: 1800–1809

Laurent de Chazelles (28 July 1724 – 28 May 1808) was a French agronomist, magistrate, and horticulturist.

== Biography ==
Laurent de Chazelles was born in Metz, France, on 28 July 1724. He was the son of a tax collector and became the lawyer for the Parliament of Metz, taking over his brother's tenure (Louis de Chazelles; 1722–1751). Laurent then became the "Président à mortier", chamber president, in 1754 for the Parliament of Metz.

Laurent was one of the founding members of the Royal Society of Arts and Sciences in Metz, to which he chaired at in 1764, 1765, and 1768. He has a castle built on his land at Lorry-devant-le-Pont, near Metz, which included magnificent greenhouses that he filled with exotic plants. His Lorry greenhouses' were paid tribute in a poem, titled Templum Metensibus sacrum by Bernardin Pierron.

As the horticulturist he was, Laurent followed in the footsteps of Philip Miller, a British botanist known as the Prince of Gardens, publishing two volumes to support Philip's work. Laurent's volumes described plants omitted from Philip's volumes, or discovered since publishing, and explains how to grow and care for them.

== Publications ==
- "Dictionnaire des Jardiniers et des Cultivateurs" by Philip Miller; Translated from English for the 8th Edition by "M.^{A} le Président" de Chazelles. 1786. 543 pg.
- "Supplément au Dictionnarie des Jardiniers" by "M." de Chazelles. 1789-1790. 770 pg.
  - A smaller edition of the book appeared in Brussels, BE in 1780

== Notes ==
A. "M." is the French equivalent of Monsieur, a word commonly attributed to either Mr. or Sir depending on the context. In this context, it is an honorific for Laurent.
