= Hans Ulrich Lehmann =

Swiss composer (1937–2013)

Hans Ulrich Lehmann (4 May 1937 – 26 January 2013) was a Swiss composer.

== Education ==
Hans Ulrich Lehmann studied violoncello at the Biel Conservatory in his hometown and music theory with Paul Müller-Zürich at the Zurich University of the Arts. From 1960 to 1963 he attended master classes in composition with Pierre Boulez and Karlheinz Stockhausen at the City of Basel Music Academy. He also studied musicology with Kurt von Fischer at the University of Zurich. From 1961 to 1972 he was a lecturer at the City of Basel Music Academy and from 1969 to 1990 lecturer for Neue Musik and music theory at the University of Zurich and from 1990 at the University of Bern. Among his students were Wolfram Schurig, Manuel Hidalgo, Hwang Long Pan, Stefan Keller, Gérard Zinsstag, Alfred Zimmerlin, Mischa Käser, Thomas Gartmann and Max E. Keller. From 1976 to 1998 he was director of the Zurich University of the Arts. From 1983 to 1986 he was president of the Association of Swiss Musicians and from 1991 to 2011 president of the SUISA.

He died in Zollikon on 26 January 2013.

== Music ==
Hans Ulrich Lehmann created from 1960 to 2011 a sizable output of about 125 works that includes large-scale works and miniatures which define the essence of his contemporary style.

== Bibliography ==
- Christoph Steiner: "Hans Ulrich Lehmann", in Komponisten der Gegenwart (KdG) (Munich: Edition Text & Kritik 1996), ISBN 978-3-86916-164-8
- Susanne Kübler: "Im Innern des Klangs. Der Schweizer Komponist Hans Ulrich Lehmann ist 75-jährig gestorben", in: Tages-Anzeiger, 27 January 2013, p. 22.
- Alfred Zimmerlin: "Der klingende, tanzende Körper. Zum Tod des Komponisten Hans Ulrich Lehmann", in: Neue Zürcher Zeitung, 28 January 2013, p. 34.
