= Édouard Boilly =

French composer

- Born: November 14, 1799; Paris, France
- Died: c. 1854; Paris, France
- Education: Conservatoire de Paris
- Occupation: Composer
- Notable work: Pyrame et Thisbé, Le Bal du sous-préfet

Édouard Boilly (14 November 1799 – 1854) was a French composer.

== Life ==
Born in Paris, Boilly came from a family of painters: his grandfather Arnould Boilly was a wood sculptor, his father was the painter Louis-Léopold Boilly. His brothers were the painter Julien-Léopold Boilly, and the graphic artist Alphonse Boilly, his nephew Eugène Boilly, the son of his half-brother Simon, became known as a portrait and history painter.

Boilly also tried his hand as a painter and graphic artist in his youth, but studied at the Conservatoire de Paris after attending the Versailles College. His teachers were François-Joseph Fétis (counterpoint) and François-Adrien Boieldieu (composition). In 1823 he won the Premier Grand Prix de Rome with the cantata Pyrame et Thisbé.

After his traditional stay at the Villa Medici in Rome and a trip to Germany, he settled in Paris in 1826. Here he worked as a piano teacher, among others at the Lycée Louis-le-Grand, and as a répétiteur in Fétis' class at the Conservatoire de Paris.

His opéra comique Le Bal du sous-préfet was successfully performed at the Opéra-Comique in 1844. His further compositions have been lost.

Boilly died in Paris (1854).
