= Joseph Coincé =

French Jesuit and physician

Joseph Coincé (1764–1833) was a French Jesuit and physician. Coincé was ordained as a Catholic priest before the French Revolution, and joined the Jesuit society in 1805 in Russian-ruled Riga, becoming superior in 1813. He went on to establish a school for noble girls and initiated the construction of a hospital.
