= Bodo Zimmermann =

WW2 German army general (1886-1963)

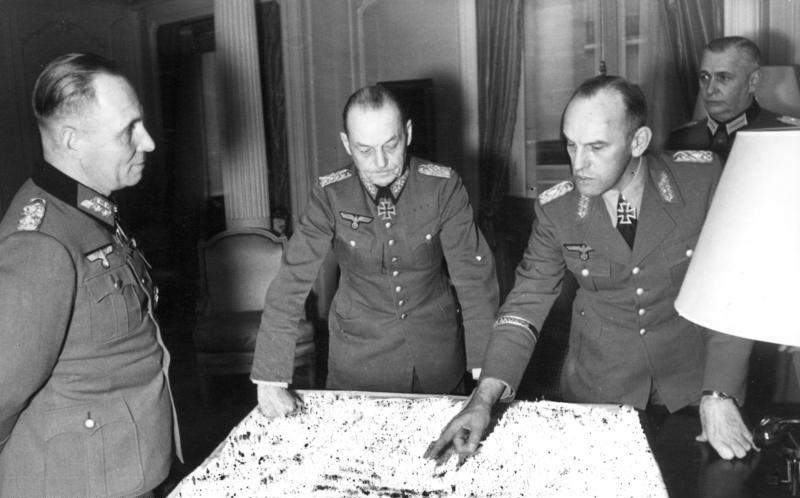
- Rommel, von Rundstedt, Alfred Gause and Bodo Zimmermann (Hotel George V, Paris, on 19 Dec.1943)
- Born: 26 November 1886; Metz, Alsace-Lorraine
- Died: 16 April 1963 (aged 76); Bonn, West Germany
- Military career
- Allegiance: German Empire (to 1918); Weimar Republic (to 1933); Nazi Germany (to 1945)
- Branch: Army
- Service years: 1906–1945
- Rank: Generalleutnant
- Commands: Chef der Führungsabteilung (western sector)
- Conflicts: World War II; World War I
- Awards: Deutsches Kreuz in Gold

Bodo Zimmermann (26 November 1886 – 16 April 1963) was a German general during the Second World War. He also was one of the few recipients of both German crosses (in Gold and in Silver).

== Biography ==
Bodo Zimmermann was born in Metz in November 1886. He began his cadet training in 1906, joining the Royal Army of Prussia. Zimmermann served in an infantry regiment of the 34th Division. From 1907 to 1914 he served in the regiment with the rank of Oberleutnant (first lieutenant). In 1915, shortly after the start of the First World War, he was promoted to the rank of captain. During the war he received the Iron Cross for his exemplary actions. Zimmermann was promoted to major in 1920 shortly before leaving the army. After the war he ran a publishing house which specialised in military literature and instructional manuals.

Shortly before the Second World War began in 1939, Zimmermann was reintegrated in the new armed forces of Nazi Germany, the Wehrmacht. As major, Zimmermann served in the High Command of the 1st Army, on the Western Front. In October 1940, he was appointed Generalstabsoffizier at the headquarters of Army Group D, under the command of Erwin von Witzleben. Zimmermann was promoted to the rank of Oberstleutnant (lieutenant colonel) on 1 August 1941, under the command of Gerd von Rundstedt. On 1 December 1942, Zimmermann was appointed colonel. On 15 February 1943, he received the German Cross in silver, for his services.

In the fall of 1944, Zimmermann became Chef der Führungsabteilung on the western sector. On 5 June (the day before D-Day), Zimmerman, the Operations Officer at OB West in France, received a message from Hans Speidel at Rommel's headquarters that the Fifteenth Army was on alert. But he did not put the Seventh Army defending Normandy on alert "because of the weather".

On 25 September 1944, Zimmerman received the German Cross in gold. He was promoted to the rank of Generalmajor on 1 December 1944. On 1 May 1945 Zimmermann was promoted to the rank of Generalleutnant.

After the war ended, he remained a prisoner until 1947. After 1948, Zimmerman published Geschichte des Oberbefehlshaber West and Ideas on the Defense of the Rhine and Western Germany as an outpost area of Western Europe. Zimmermann died in Bonn in 1963.

== Decorations ==
- Iron Cross of 1914, 1st and 2nd class
- Deutsches Kreuz
  - in Gold, on 25 September 1944
  - in Silver, on 15 February 1943
- Honour Cross of the World War 1914/1918

== Sources ==
- Dermot Bradley, Kar-Friedrich Hildebrand, Markus Rövekamp, Die Generale des Heeres 1921–1945, Band 3, Osnabrück 1994
