= Julius von Bernuth =

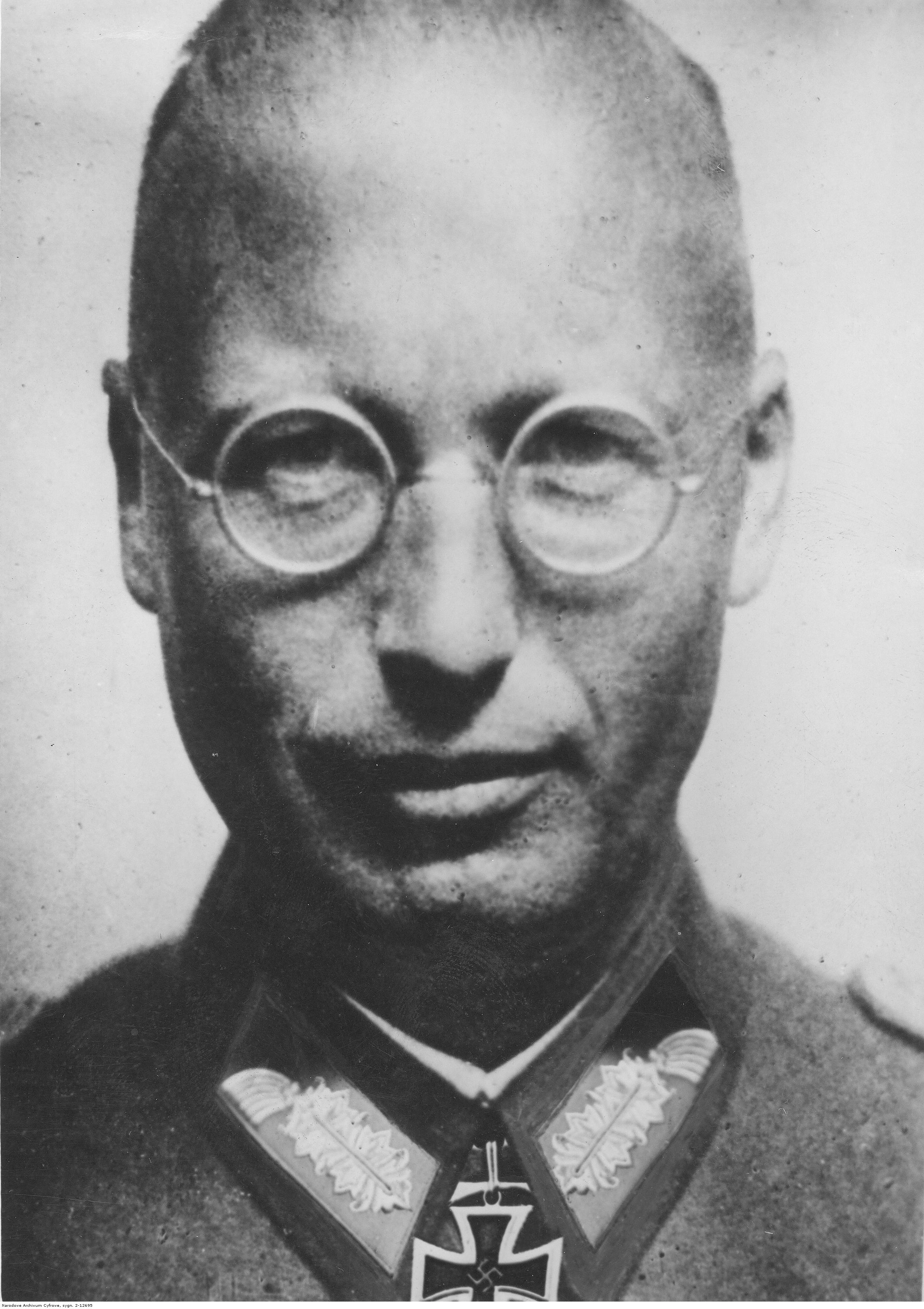
- Born: 12 August 1897; Metz
- Died: 12 July 1942 (aged 44); Sumy, Soviet Union
- Military career
- Allegiance: Nazi Germany
- Branch: Army
- Rank: Generalmajor
- Conflicts: World War I World War II
- Awards: Knight's Cross of the Iron Cross

Julius Hans Camillo Friedrich Leo Ludwig von Bernuth (12 August 1897 – 12 July 1942) was a general in the Wehrmacht of Nazi Germany who served during World War II.

He was an early Nazi supporter and was a participant in the Beer Hall Putsch of 1923. He was later awarded the Blood Order.

On 12 July 1942, while flying in a Fieseler Storch from Army headquarters to XXXX Army Corps headquarters, his aircraft disappeared. Searchers found his remains in the wreckage of the plane at Sumy, on 14 July 1942. He was buried near Stalingrad.

== Awards and decorations ==
- Iron Cross (1914), 1st and 2nd class
- Clasp to the Iron Cross (1939), 1st and 2nd class
- Knight's Cross of the Iron Cross on 5 August 1940 as Oberstleutnant in the general staff and chief of the general staff of the XV. Armeekorps
