= Kurt Haseloff =

German general

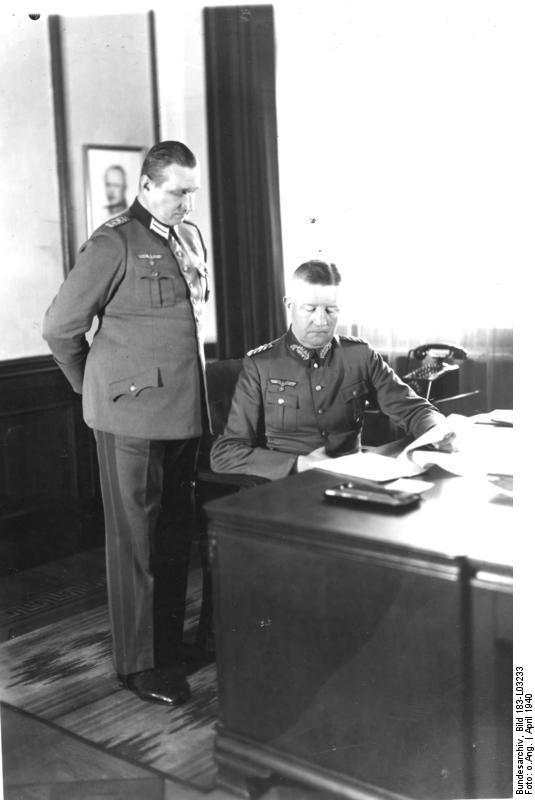
- Kurt Haseloff and General Friedrich Fromm in April 1940
- Born: 18 March 1894; Metz, Imperial Territory of Alsace-Lorraine, German Empire
- Died: 30 September 1978 (aged 84); Munich, Bavaria, West Germany
- Relatives: ∞ 8 June 1920 Charlotte Schultz; 2 daughters
- Military career
- Allegiance: German Empire; Weimar Republic; Nazi Germany
- Branch: Imperial German Army; Reichsheer; German Army
- Service years: 1914–1945
- Rank: Generalmajor
- Commands: 5th Rifle Brigade; 5th Panzergrenadier Brigade
- Conflicts: World War I World War II
- Awards: Iron Cross; War Merit Cross

Kurt Friedrich Werner Ludwig Wilhelm Haseloff (1894–1978) was a German general during World War II.

== Life ==
Kurt Haseloff was born in Metz in Alsace-Lorraine as the son of Protestant officer Colonel Wilhelm Haseloff and his wife Elisabeth, née Süßkind. After achieving his Abitur in February 1913, he studied in Berlin from March 1913 to July 1914. In August 1914, he joined the Imperial German Army as an officer candidate. He served as a 2nd Lieutenant during World War I.

He was retained in the Reichswehr, and then in the Wehrmacht. On 4 February 1938, he was appointed Chief of Staff of the General Army Office (AHA) in the Army High Command (OKH) under Friedrich Fromm.

On 15 February 1940, when Fromm was appointed chief of army armaments and commander of the replacement army (Chief H Rüst u BdE), he took Haseloff with him as his chief of staff.

Haseloff was appointed commander of the 5th Rifle Brigade on 1 March 1941 and was later to the Eastern Front. On 5 July 1942, the brigade was renamed to 5th Panzergrenadier Brigade.

On 1 January 1943, Generalmajor Haseloff was appointed Chief of the General Staff of the Commanding General of Military-District General Government. On 6 May 1944, Haseloff was appointed head of the Budget (Haushalt) Department (Amtsgruppe; Ag) under the Chief of Army Armaments and Commander of the Replacement Army (Chief H Rüst u BdE) Friedrich Fromm.

Following the assassination attempt of 20 July 1944 and his long-standing intensive subservience and "friendship" with Generaloberst Fromm, he was relieved of his duties on 11 August 1944 and imprisoned "for the duration of the war in the Germersheim fortress detention center." He was released after a short time.

His discharge from military service was scheduled for 9 October 1944, but this order was rescinded. On 26 November 1944, he was transferred to the Führerreserve (Army High Command Leader Reserve), and on 14 February 1945, effective 28 February 1945, he was honorably discharged from active military service with the statutory pension and "the right to wear his previous uniform".

== Promotions ==
- 11 August 1914 Fahnenjunker (Officer Candidate)
- 21 November 1914 Fahnenjunker-Gefreiter (Officer Candidate with Lance Corporal rank)
- 18 December 1914 Fahnenjunker-Oberjäger (Officer Candidate with Corporal/NCO/Junior Sergeant rank)
- 22 May 1915 Leutnant (2nd Lieutenant) without Patent
  - 6 October 1917 received Patent from 11 September 1913
  - 1 July 1922 received Reichswehr Rank Seniority (RDA) from 1 April 1914 (29)
- 16 July 1923 Oberleutnant (1st Lieutenant) with effect and RDA from 1 July 1923 (8)
- 1 April 1928 Hauptmann (Captain) with RDA from 1 April 1928 (25)
- 1 November 1934 Major (2)
- 31 July 1937 Oberstleutnant (Lieutenant Colonel) with effect and RDA from 1 August 1937 (13)
  - 20 March 1939 received new and improved RDA from 1 January 1937 (43a)
- 30 November 1939 Oberst (Colonel) with effect and RDA from 1 December 1939 (6)
  - 14 August 1940 received new and improved RDA from 1 June 1939 (9a)
- 18 December 1942 Generalmajor (Major General) with effect and RDA from 1 January 1943 (6)

== Awards and decorations ==
- Medal for Bravery (Austria-Hungary) in Silver (2nd Class) in February 1915
- Iron Cross (1914), 2nd and 1st Class
  - 2nd Class on 27 November 1916
  - 1st Class on 4 June 1918
- Military Merit Cross (Austria-Hungary), 3rd Class with War Decoration (ÖM3K) on 8 July 1918
- Honour Cross of the World War 1914/1918 with Swords
- Austrian War Commemorative Medal with Swords
- Hungarian World War Commemorative Medal with Swords
- Wehrmacht Long Service Award, 4th to 1st Class
  - 2nd Class on 2 October 1936
  - 1st Class in 1939
- Anschluss Medal
- Sudetenland Medal with Prague Castle Clasp
- Cross of Merit (4th Class) of the Decoration of Honour of the German Red Cross on 20 April 1939

=== WWII ===
- Repetition Clasp 1939 to the Iron Cross 1914, 2nd and 1st Class
  - 2nd Class on 26 July 1940
  - 1st Class on 8 May 1941
- Imperial Order of the Yoke and Arrows, Commander (Encomienda Sencilla) on 20 March 1941
- Order of the Star of Romania, Commander's Cross with Swords on 16 July 1942
- Winter Battle in the East 1941–42 Medal on 11 August 1942
- War Merit Cross (1939), 2nd Class with Swords on 1 September 1943

== Sources ==
- German Federal Archives: BArch PERS 6/1338 and PERS 6/299800

== Sources ==
- (de) Dermot Bradley: Die Generale des Heeres 1921-1945, Band 5: v. Haack-Hitzfeld; Biblio Verlag, Osnabrück, 1999.
