= Hermann Schaefer =

German general

- Born: 12 September 1885; Metz, Alsace-Lorraine, German Empire
- Died: 1962 (aged 76–77); Wyk auf Föhr, West Germany
- Military career
- Allegiance: German Empire (to 1918); Weimar Republic (to 1933); Nazi Germany
- Branch: Army
- Rank: Generalmajor
- Units: Infanterie-Regiment 22; Infanterie-Regiment 80
- Commands: Kommandant von Kassel; Feld-Kommandeur 589
- Conflicts: World War II; World War I
- Awards: Eisernes Kreuz

Hermann Schaefer (12 September 1885 – 1962) was a German general during the Second World War.

== Biography ==
In 1885, Hermann Schaefer was born in Metz, in Alsace-Lorraine. Schaefer fought during the First World War, with the rank of Oberleutnant ('First Lieutenant') and eventually Hauptmann ('Captain'). He made a career in the Reichswehr, then in the German army. During the Second World War, Hermann Schaefer participated in many military operations in Poland and Italy. He obtained the rank of Generalmajor in February 1941.

Hermann Schaefer died in 1962 in Kassel, West Germany.

== Decorations ==
- Eisernes Kreuz

== Sources ==
- (de) Biography of Hermann Schaefer
