= Ludwig Bieringer =

- Born: 12 August 1892; Metz, Alsace-Lorraine
- Died: 22 January 1975 (aged 82); Hanover, Germany
- Military career
- Allegiance: German Empire (to 1918); Weimar Republic (to 1933); Nazi Germany (to 1945)
- Branch: Army
- Service years: 1914–1945
- Rank: Generalmajor
- Unit: 7th Motor-Transport-Battalion
- Commands: Feld Kommandantur 800
- Conflicts: World War II; World War I
- Awards: Iron Cross; Ehrenkreuz für Frontkämpfer

Ludwig Bieringer (12 August 1892 – 22 January 1975) was a German general during World War II. A lifelong professional soldier, he served his country as a junior officer in World War I, a staff officer in the inter-war period and a brigade-level commander during World War II.

== Biography ==
Born on 12 August 1892 in Metz, Ludwig Bieringer joined the German Army straight from school in 1913. During the First World War, he was an Oberleutnant (First Lieutenant). Bieringer served mainly in the 8th Train-Battalion. Bieringer was promoted to major in 1934, and served as Staff-Officer of Transport Troops, with the Staff of the 7th Division. He was promoted to Commander of the 7th Motor-Transport-Battalion in October 1935, before being promoted to Course-Director at the Army Supply School, in 1937.

As Army Supply Leader at the beginning of the Second World War, Bieringer assumed command of the Outpost of the General-Quartermaster, with the Army Group South, in June 1942, and then with the Army Group A. Bieringer was promoted to the grade of Generalmajor in July 1943. Bieringer was in charge of the supply of the troops, this time in Italy, from June to September 1943. From September 1943 to April 1944, he was detached as Field Commander assistant to the Feld Kommandantur of Besançon. Bieringer was eventually nominated Feld Kommandeur in Draguignan (Feld Kommandantur 800). Captured in August 1944, Bieringer was released in May 1947.

Bieringer died on 22 January 1975, in Hanover.

== Military career ==
- Fähnrich (01 Aug 1914);
- Leutnant (07 Aug 1914);
- Oberleutnant (22 Mar 1918);
- Rittmeister (01 Jun 1926);
- Major (01 Aug 1934);
- Oberstleutnant (01 Jan 1937);
- Oberst (01 Jan 1940);
- Generalmajor (01 Jul 1943)

== Decorations ==
- Iron Cross of 1939, 1st and 2nd Class
- Iron Cross of 1914, 1st and 2nd Class
- Friedrich August Cross, 2nd class
- Honour Cross of the World War 1914/1918
- Wehrmacht Long Service Award, 1st Class
- Eastern Front Medal

== Sources ==
- Die Generale des Heeres 1921–1945
