= Arthur von Briesen =

German general and Iron Cross recipient

- Born: 26 September 1891; Metz, Alsace-Lorraine
- Died: 15 May 1981 (aged 89); Konstanz, Germany
- Military career
- Allegiance: German Empire (to 1918); Weimar Republic (to 1933); Nazi Germany
- Branch: Army
- Service years: 1909–1945
- Rank: Generalmajor
- Unit: 27th Infantry-Regiment
- Commands: Commandant of Prague 1939-1944
- Conflicts: World War I World War II
- Awards: Ritterkreuz des kgl. Preuss. Hausordens von Hohenzollern mit Schwertern

Arthur von Briesen (26 September 1891 – 15 May 1981) was a Generalmajor in the Wehrmacht during World War II.

== Biography ==
Arthur von Briesen was born in Metz, in Alsace-Lorraine, at the time part of the German Empire. He began his military career on 24 March 1909 as a cadet (Fähnrich) in the 52nd Artillery Regiment. Then, in 1913, he was commissioned as an acting lieutenant into the 18th Ulanen-Regiment. In August 1914, at the outbreak of the First World War, Briesen was permanently transferred to the 18th Ulanen-Regiment, where he remained until 1916. Promoted to the substantive rank of Lieutenant in May 1916, Briesen was appointed aide-de-camp in different staffs, including in the High Command from 1917 to September 1919. During the war, he was awarded the prestigious Iron Cross (first class).

In September 1919, Briesen was transferred to the police, where he stayed until 1 October 1934, when he rejoined the regular army with the rank of Commander (Major). He was assigned to the Rostock Infantry Regiment until October 1935, then commanded the 3rd Battalion the 27th Infantry Regiment from October 1935 to November 1938, with the rank of lieutenant colonel. Promoted to the rank of Colonel on 1 April 1938, Briesen was assigned to the Staff of the 27th Infantry Regiment, until May 1939.

In 1939, following the completion of the German occupation of Czechoslovakia in March, Briesen was appointed to command the city of Prague, where he remained for five years. He was rewarded with the Iron Cross in 1939. On 1 October 1942, Briesen was promoted to the rank of Generalmajor and in March 1944 was appointed commander of Brody in Ukraine. In May 1944 he was assigned to the headquarters of the Wehrmacht in Italy, to be retrained. From July to November 1944, Briesen was assigned to the headquarters of the troops stationed in Bohemia and Moravia. He was taken prisoner on 8 May 1945, when German forces across Europe surrendered unconditionally, and was not released until some two years later.

Arthur von Briesen died in 1981, near Konstanz.

== Promotions ==
- Charakter als Fähnrich (24 March 1909);
- Fähnrich (18 October 1909);
- Leutnant (22 August 1910);
- Oberleutnant (15 May 1916);
- Charakter als Rittmeister (15 September 1919);
- Polizei-Oberleutnant (15 September 1919);
- Polizei-Hauptmann (1 August 1920);
- Polizei-Major (1 December 1933);
- Major (1 October 1934);
- Oberstleutnant (1 December 1935);
- Oberst (1 April 1938);
- Generalmajor (1 October 1942)

== Awards and decorations ==
- Knights Cross of the Royal House Order of Hohenzollern with Swords
- Iron Cross of 1914, 2nd and 1st Class
- Iron Cross of 1939, 2nd and 1st Class
- Honour Cross of the World War 1914/1918
- War Merit Cross (1939) 1st and 2nd class with Swords
- Wehrmacht Long Service Award, 1st Class
- Austrian War Remembrance Medal with swords
- Hungarian World War Commemorative Medal with Swords
