= Arthur Kobus =

German general

- Born: 9 February 1879; Metz, Alsace-Lorraine
- Died: April 1945 (aged 66); Berlin, Germany
- Military career
- Allegiance: German Empire (to 1918); Weimar Republic (to 1933); Nazi Germany
- Branch: Army
- Rank: Generalleutnant
- Conflicts: World War I World War II
- Awards: Eisernes Kreuz

Fritz Arthur Kobus (9 February 1879 – April 1945) was a German general during the Second World War.

== Biography ==
Arthur Kobus was born on 9 February 1879, in Metz, Alsace-Lorraine and entered military service on 18 March 1897 as an officer candidat (Fahnenjunker). Kobus fought during the First World War, with the rank of Officer. He followed his career in the Reichswehr, then in the Heer, the German army. During the Second World War, Arthur Kobus served in many significant military assignments, and participated in a few military operations. He eventually attained the rank of Generalleutnant on 1 July 1942. In April 1945, General Kobus committed suicide in Berlin, rather than surrender to the Red Army.

== Awards and decorations ==
- Prussian Centenary Medal 1897
- Iron Cross (1914), 2nd and 1st Class
- Brunswick War Merit Cross, 2nd and 1st Class (BrKr1/BrK1)
  - 2nd Class with the Frontline Service Horse Clasp on the ribbon (BrKr2a/BrK2a)
- Wound Badge (1918) in Black
- Prussian Long Service Cross for 25 years
- Honour Cross of the World War 1914/1918 with Swords
- Wehrmacht Long Service Award
- War Merit Cross (1939), 2nd and 1st Class

== Sources ==
- Generale der Reichswehr und Wehrmacht mit K on lexikon-der-wehrmacht.de
- Rangliste des Deutschen Reichsheeres, 1928, p. 116
