= Ernst Schreder =

German general

- Born: 21 June 1892; Metz, Alsace-Lorraine
- Died: 6 December 1941 (aged 49) (DOW); Königsberg, Germany
- Military career
- Allegiance: German Empire (to 1918); Weimar Republic (to 1933); Nazi Germany (to 1945)
- Branch: Army
- Service years: 1914–1941
- Rank: Generalmajor
- Conflicts: World War II; World War II
- Awards: Eisernes Kreuz; Deutsches Kreuz in Gold, on 19 December 1941

Ernst Schreder (21 June 1892 – 6 December 1941) was a German general during the Second World War.

== Biography ==
Ernst Schreder was born on 21 June 1892 in Metz, Alsace-Lorraine. He fought during the First World War. After the war, he pursued a career in the Police. He later joined the Heer, the army of the Wehrmacht.

During the Second World War, Ernst Schreder served as an officer in many military assignments, and participated in significant military operations on both the Eastern and Western fronts. He eventually obtained the rank of Generalmajor on 1 December 1941.

Schreder was seriously wounded on the Eastern Front in October 1941, and later succumbed to his injuries in Königsberg (Kaliningrad) on 6 December 1941. On December 19, 1941, he was posthumously decorated with the German Cross in Gold, in recognition for the actions he took and the sacrifices he made to fight with his troops. The German Cross was issued in two degrees: gold and silver, the former being an award for bravery, the latter being for distinguished service and was considered a continuation of the War Merit Cross with swords.

=== Decorations ===
- Deutsches Kreuz in Gold, on 19 December 1941

== Sources ==
- Die Generale des Heeres 1921–1945.
