= Hans Leistikow (artist) =

German artist and graphic designer (1892–1962)

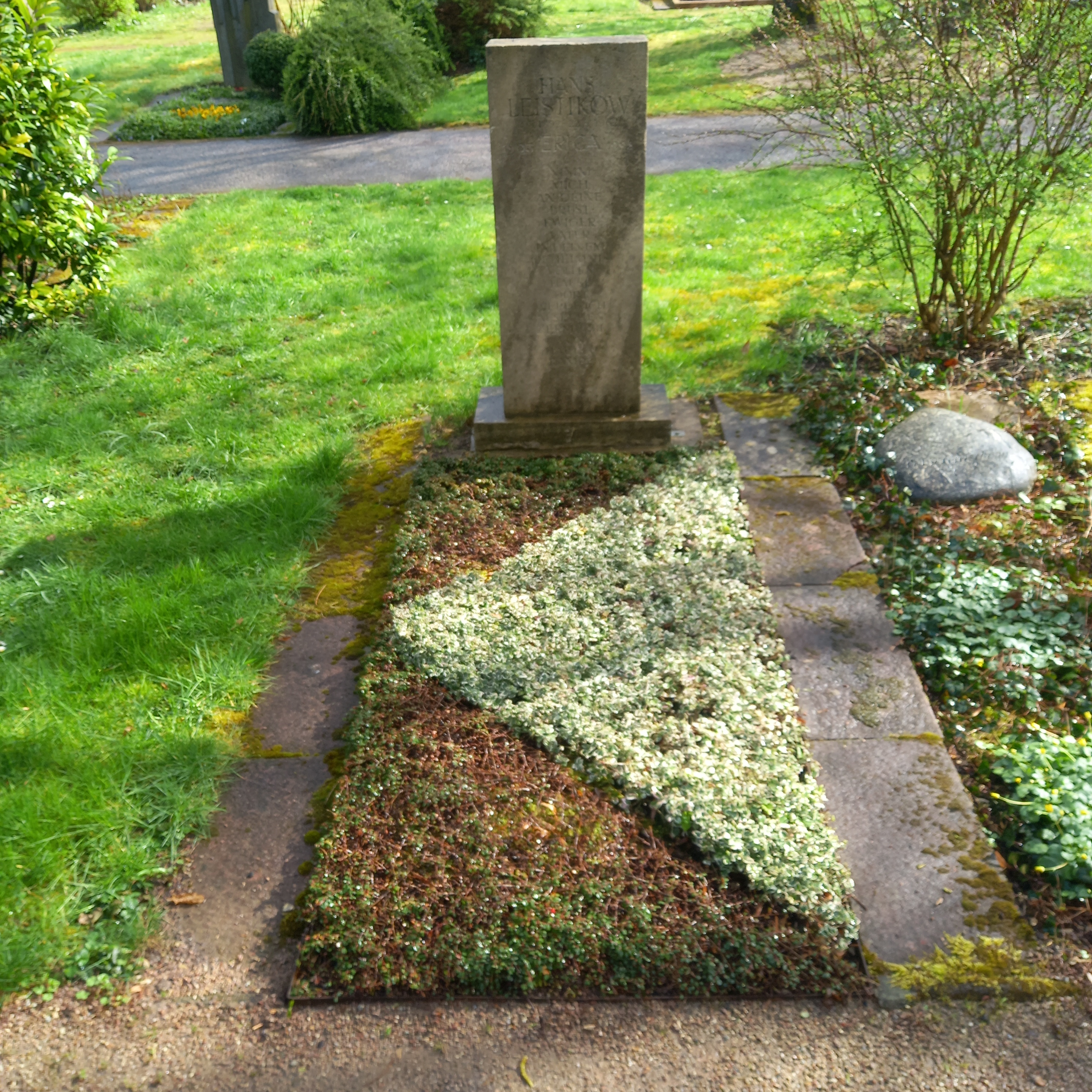
Grave of Leistikow and his wife at the Südfriedhof cemetery in Frankfurt

Hans Leistikow (4 May 1892 – 22 March 1962) was a German artist, specialising in graphic design.

From 1925 onwards, he took part in the New Frankfurt affordable-housing project.

== Early life and education ==
Leistikow was born in Elbląg, the eldest of three children of the pharmacist Johannes Leistikow (1863–1897) from Elbląg and his wife, Käte (nee Zachler; 1869–1945), from Breslau. This also made him a nephew of Walter Leistikow and an elder brother to Grete Leistikow, whilst his brother Wolf died aged 18 in 1914.

He studied at the Staatliche Akademie für Kunst und Kunstgewerbe Breslau under Hans Poelzig. Poelzig recommended that Leistikow use a signature that would distinguish him from his father's brother Walter Leistikow and from then on Hans signed his works "HAL", adding a letter A between his initials to express his admiration for Edgar Allan Poe.

== Award ==
In 1957, he was awarded the Goethe-Plakette des Landes Hessen.

== Legacy ==
Streets are named after him in Kassel and Frankfurt.

== Bibliography ==
- Susan R. Henderson: Building Culture. Ernst May and the New Frankfurt Initiative 1926–1931. Peter Lang, Frankfurt am Main / New York 2013, ISBN 978-1-4539-0533-3.
- (in German) Max Kolpe: Hans Leistikow. In: Gebrauchsgraphik, 6. Jahrgang 1929, Heft 10, S. 23–31 (Digitalisat).
- (in German) Tobias Picard: Durch den Kopf des Auftraggebers denken. Der Gestalter Hans Leistikow. In: Kunst und Künstler in Frankfurt am Main im 19. und 20. Jahrhundert (= Archiv für Frankfurts Geschichte und Kunst, Band 69). Frankfurt am Main 2003.
- (in German) Tobias Picard: Leistikow, Hans in the Frankfurter Personenlexikon (Erweiterte Onlinefassung, Stand des Artikels 8. November 2020), also in: Wolfgang Klötzer (ed.): Frankfurter Biographie. Personengeschichtliches Lexikon. Erster Band. A–L (= Veröffentlichungen der Frankfurter Historischen Kommission. Band XIX, Nr. 1). Waldemar Kramer, Frankfurt am Main 1994, ISBN 3-7829-0444-3, S. 450 f.
- (in German) Bettina Schmitt, Rosemarie Wesp (ed.): Zurück in die Moderne. Hans Leistikow (1892–1962). Anlässlich der gleichnamigen Ausstellung im Dommuseum Frankfurt. 3. Oktober 2022 – 29. Januar 2023. Schnell und Steiner, Regensburg 2022, ISBN 978-3-7954-3641-4.
- (in German) Jörg Stürzebecher u. a.: Exemplarisch. Hans Leistikow. Ein Projekt der Universität Gesamthochschule Kassel. Universität-Gesamthochschule Kassel, Fachbereich Visuelle Kommunikation, Kassel 1995, OCLC 75629223.
- (in German) Rosemarie Wesp, Dieter Wesp: Hans und Grete. Die Geschwister Leistikow als Gestalter des Neuen Frankfurt. Ausstellungsbroschüre, Frankfurt am Main 2016 (online als PDF-Dokument).
- (in German) Liane Wilhelmus: Zwischen Gegenständlichkeit und geometrischer Abstraktion. Hans Leistikows Arbeiten in Baden-Württemberg. In: Denkmalpflege in Baden-Württemberg. Nachrichtenblatt der Landesdenkmalpflege 4/2023, S. 278–283 (Digitalisat).
