= Kurt von Falkowski =

- Born: 3 November 1886; Metz, Alsace-Lorraine, German Empire
- Died: 1 April 1953 (aged 66); Einbeck, West Germany
- Military career
- Allegiance: German Empire; Nazi Germany
- Branch: Prussian Army (1906–19); Luftwaffe (1935–42)
- Service years: 1906–19; 1935–42
- Rank: Generalmajor
- Commands: Luftwaffen-Bau-Brigade I (1942)
- Conflicts: World War I World War II: Defense of the Reich
- Awards: Ritterkreuz des Königlichen Hausorden von Hohenzollern mit Schwertern

Kurt von Falkowski (3 November 1886 – 1 April 1953) was a Generalmajor in the Luftwaffe during World War II.

== Biography ==
Kurt von Falkowski was born in Metz, Lorraine. During World War I, he served as an officer in the artillery. In 1935, Falkowski was appointed commander of the V Luftzeuggruppe in Munich.

From December 1936 until March 1941, von Falkowski was in charge of Wehrbereichskommando Passau.

In March 1941, Kurt von Falkowski assumed command of the Brigade Luftwaffen-Bau-I. Falkowski was promoted Generalmajor in November 1941.

Kurt von Falkowski died on 1 April 1953, in Einbeck.

== Awards and decorations ==
- Ritterkreuz des Königlichen Hausorden von Hohenzollern mit Schwertern
- 1914 EK I
- 1914 EK II
- Ehrenkreuz für Frontkämpfer
- Wehrmacht-Dienstauszeichnung IV. bis I. Klasse
- Medaille zur Erinnerung an den 01.10.1938
- Kriegsverdienstkreuz II. Klasse mit Schwertern
- Kriegsverdienstkreuz I. Klasse mit Schwertern
