= Hanns Benda =

German World War II Admiral

- Born: August 19, 1877; Metz, Alsace-Lorraine
- Died: February 27, 1951 (aged 73); Malente, Germany
- Military career
- Allegiance: German Empire; Weimar Republic (to 1933); Nazi Germany
- Branch: Imperial German Navy; Reichsmarine; Kriegsmarine
- Service years: 1904-1945
- Rank: Admiral
- Commands: AdmOberstabsintendant
- Conflicts: World War I World War II
- Awards: German Cross in Silver

Hanns Benda (1877–1951) was a German Admiral during World War II.

== Biography ==
Hanns Benda was born in Metz, Alsace-Lorraine, in 1877. Benda studied law at the University of Leipzig and at the University of Jena from 1896 to 1899. On 18 October 1899, he was promoted to the rank of reserve lieutenant. From 1900 to 1904, Benda served in various courts, including in Weimar. Hanns Benda joined the Kaiserliche Marine on 1 March 1904. He served as quartermaster in Wilhelmshaven. On 3 January 1909, Benda managed an office of the Imperial Navy. On 6 July 1914, Hanns Benda was transferred to the Central Office of the imperial maritime management. After the First World War, he continued his career in the Reichsmarine then in the Kriegsmarine. On 1 June 1935, Benda was appointed Chief of the office of economic management, of the German Navy. During this time, he often conducted the duties of a commanding admiral.

On 1 November 1939, after a further reorganization of the Department of Navy, Benda became chief deputy of the Administration Department of the Navy. Benda was promoted to the rank of admiral on August 19, 1942. Still at the naval high command (Oberkommando der Marine - OKM), Benda was appointed Admiral-Oberstabsintendant on 1 May 1944. On February 28, 1945, Benda asserted his right to retire. For his entire career, Benda received the Deutsches Kreuz in silver, on 18 March 1945. Hanns Benda died on 27 February 1951, in Malente, Schleswig-Holstein.

== Awards ==
- German cross (Deutsches Kreuz) in Silver, on 18 March 1945 (AdmOberstabsintendant, OKM, Marinewehr C)
