= Herbert Gundelach =

German general

- Born: 15 June 1899; Metz, Alsace-Lorraine, German Empire present-day Metz, France
- Died: 4 November 1971 (aged 72); Hochdahl, North Rhine-Westphalia, West Germany present-day part of Erkrath, Federal Republic of Germany
- Military career
- Allegiance: German Empire (to 1918); Weimar Republic (to 1933); Nazi Germany (to 1945)
- Branch: Army
- Service years: 1918–1945
- Rank: Generalmajor
- Conflicts: World War II
- Awards: Eisernes Kreuz, Deutsches Kreuz in Gold

Herbert Gundelach (15 June 1899 – 4 November 1971) was a German general during the Second World War.

== Biography ==
On 15 June 1899, Herbert Gundelach was born in Metz, Alsace-Lorraine. Gundelach joined the German Army straight from school. After the war, Gundelach made a brilliant military career in the Reichswehr, which was limited to a standing army of 100 000 men, and then in the Heer, the regular German army.

During the Second World War, Herbert Gundelach participated in many significant military operations. From 1939 to 1941, Lieutenant Colonel Gundelach was appointed as General Generalstabsoffizier in the 16th Infantry Division. The 16.Infanterie-Division fought in the campaign against the Balkans in April, 1941, and then later as a part of the southern sector of the Eastern Front in June, 1941. From February to October 1944, Gundelach was Chief of the General Staff of the XXVIII. Armeekorps. Herbert Gundelach eventually obtained the rank of Generalmajor. He ended the war in captivity, surrendering to the Allies in 1945. He was a prisoner of war at Camp Ritchie in Maryland and was involved with the Hill Project, an effort to use German POWs to translate texts to better understand Military efforts of the Nazi regime following the end of the War. He was released in September 1947.

Herbert Gundelach died in 1971.

== Decorations ==
- Eisernes Kreuz (1914) 2nd class;
- Verwundetenabzeichen (wound stripe) (1918) in Schwarz (black);
- Spange zum Eisernen Kreuz 2nd class;
- Eisernes Kreuz (1939) 1st class;
- Deutsches Kreuz in Gold, 26 January 1942;

== Sources ==
- Dermot Bradley: Die Generale des Heeres 1921-1945, vol 4: Fleck-Gyldenfeldt, Biblio Verlag, Osnabrück, 1996, (p. 493-495).
