= Otto Krueger (general) =

- Born: 29 December 1891; Metz
- Died: 6 June 1976 (aged 84); Niederaschau, Bavaria
- Military career
- Allegiance: German Empire Nazi Germany
- Branch: Imperial German Navy (1909–1919) Luftwaffe (1934–1943)
- Service years: 1909–1943
- Rank: Generalmajor
- Commands: Luftwaffen-Bau-Brigade V
- Conflicts: World War I World War II

Otto Krueger (29 December 1891 – 6 June 1976) was a Generalmajor, in the Luftwaffe, during World War II.

== Biography ==
Otto Krueger was born in Metz, Lorraine, on December 29, 1891. Fähnrich zur See on 15 April 1912, he was promoted Leutnant zur See on 3 August 1914. During World War I, he served as an Oberleutnant zur See in the Kaiserliche Marine.

Otto Krueger stayed in the army after the war. He was promoted to Kapitänleutnant in 1921, Korvettenkapitän in 1929, Oberstleutnant in 1934 and Oberst in August 1937.

When World War II broke out, the Commander of the 26th Flying-Replacement-Battalion was transferred to the Luftwaffe-Construction-staff, first in Schleswig, in France (Lille) and then in Norway, before being promoted to the rank of Generalmajor in November 1941. Between Mars 1941 and Mars 1942, Otto Krueger assumed command of the Luftwaffe-Construction-Brigade V, before commanding the 11th aerial district.

Otto Krueger died in Niederaschau, Bavaria, on 6 June 1976.

== Bibliography ==
- Generale der Reichswehr und Wehrmacht mit K on
- Generalmajor Otto Krueger
