= Walther Kittel =

German general

- Born: 20 March 1887
- Died: 11 November 1971 (aged 84)
- Military career
- Allegiance: Nazi Germany
- Branch: Army (Wehrmacht)
- Service years: 1905–1945
- Rank: Generalmajor
- Conflicts: World War I World War II
- Awards: Knight's Cross of the War Merit Cross

Walther Kittel (1887–1971) was a German general of medical services during World War II.

== Biography ==
Walther Kittel was born in Metz, Alsace-Lorraine, on 20 March 1887. Kittel joined the German Army straight from school at eighteen years old in order to become a military doctor. As Oberarzt, Kittel began a brilliant career in the University of Göttingen.

From 1914 to 1918, during the First World War, Kittel served as Stabsarzt. He stayed in the army after the war, as a medical officer. Walther Kittel was promoted to the rank of Generaloberarzt in April 1931, and Oberstarzt in January 1934. He continued his career as Generalarzt in January 1937, and eventually Generalstabsarzt on 1 October 1940.

Affected first in the 1st Army, he was posted then in the 12th Army on 22 December 1940, then in the 6th Army on 19 June 1942. As Chief Medical Officer in the Army Group Don, Kittel received the German Cross in silver on 24 February 1943. Chief Medical Officer in the Army Group South from March 1943 to April 1944, he was then assigned to the Army Group Ukraine, then to the Army Group A from September 1944 to January 1945 and eventually to the Army Group Centre, from January to May 1945. Prisoner of war on 8 May 1945, Walter Kittel remained in captivity until 1947.

Member of the Scientific Council for Health Affairs of the German Ministry of Defence from 1963 to 1967, Walter Kittel died on 11 November 1971, in Wiesbaden.

== Awards and decorations ==
- German Cross in Silver (24 February 1943), as Surgeon General and Army Group South doctor in the quartermaster department of task force Don
- Iron Cross 1914 (2nd and 1st classes)
- Knight's Cross of Order of Franz Joseph with war decoration (Austro-Hungary)
- Knight's Cross of the War Merit Cross with Swords (4 June 1944) as Surgeon General and Army Group South doctor in the quartermaster department of task force Don

== Sources ==
- Helmut Berthold: Die Lilien und den Wein: Gottfried Benns Frankreich, Würzburg : Königshausen & Neumann, 1999.
