= Hans Leistikow (general) =

German general

- Born: 29 August 1895; Metz, Alsace-Lorraine
- Died: 29 March 1967 (aged 71); Krautheim, Germany
- Military career
- Allegiance: German Empire (to 1918); Weimar Republic (to 1933); Nazi Germany
- Branch: Army
- Rank: Generalmajor
- Commands: Feldkommandeur of Laval
- Conflicts: World War II; World War I
- Awards: Ehrenkreuz, Hohenzollern

Hans Leistikow was a German general during the Second World War.

== Biography ==
In August 1895, Hans Leistikow was born in Metz in Alsace-Lorraine. He fought during the First World War and made a military career in the German army. Senior Officer at the beginning of World War II, Leistikow participated in the battle of France. After various assignments, Hans Leistikow was appointed Feldkommandeur of Laval (Feldkommandantur 582) in June 1944. While German troops retreated in front of the victorious US Army, Leistikow was promoted to the grade of Generalmajor on 1 October 1944. He was captured shortly after.

Hans Leistikow died in 1967, at Krautheim, Baden-Württemberg.

== Decorations ==
- Iron Cross of 1914, 1st and 2nd class
- Knight's Cross of the Royal House Order of Hohenzollern with Swords
- Wound Badge (1918) in Black
- Hanseatic Cross of Hamburg

== Sources ==
- Die Generale des Heeres 1921–1945.
