= Hans-Albrecht Lehmann =

German general

- Born: 6 February 1894; Metz, Alsace-Lorraine
- Died: 27 November 1976 (aged 82); Garmisch-Partenkirchen, Germany
- Military career
- Allegiance: German Empire (to 1918); Weimar Republic (to 1933); Nazi Germany (to 1945)
- Branch: Army
- Service years: 1914–1945
- Rank: Generalmajor
- Commands: Feldkommandeur of Laval
- Conflicts: World War II; World War II
- Awards: German Cross in Silver

Hans-Albrecht Lehmann (6 February 1894 – 27 November 1976) was a German general during the Second World War.

== Biography ==
Lehmann was born on 6 February 1894 in Metz in Lorraine. Lehmann served in the First World War with the Imperial German Army, leaving the service with the rank of Oberleutnant. After the war, he entered the Berlin police department in February 1920. In October 1935, he enlisted in the Wehrmacht and continued his military career, gradually climbing the ranks. Lehmann was appointed commander of the "Nachrichtentruppe I", in Königsberg, on 1 April 1938. Lehmann was an Oberstleutnant on the eve of the Second World War. As an Oberst in the Sixteenth German Army, Lehmann received the Deutsches Kreuz in silver, on 25 March 1943. Thanks to his leadership skills, Lehmann was shortly afterwards promoted to Generalmajor, on 1 September 1943.

Lehmann died in 1976, at Garmisch-Partenkirchen, in Bavaria.

== Decorations ==
- Eisernes Kreuz (1914), 2nd and 1st classes
- Eisernen Kreuz (1939), 2nd and 1st classes
- Deutsches Kreuz in Silver, on 25 March 1943.

== Sources ==
- Dermot Bradley: Die Generale des Heeres 1921-1945, Band 7, Knabe-Luz; Biblio Verlag, Bissendorf, 2004 (p. 430-431).
