= December 1917 =

Month in 1917

<<	December 1917					>>
Su	Mo	Tu	We	Th	Fr	Sa
						1
2	3	4	5	6	7	8
9	10	11	12	13	14	15
16	17	18	19	20	21	22
23	24	25	26	27	28	29
30	31

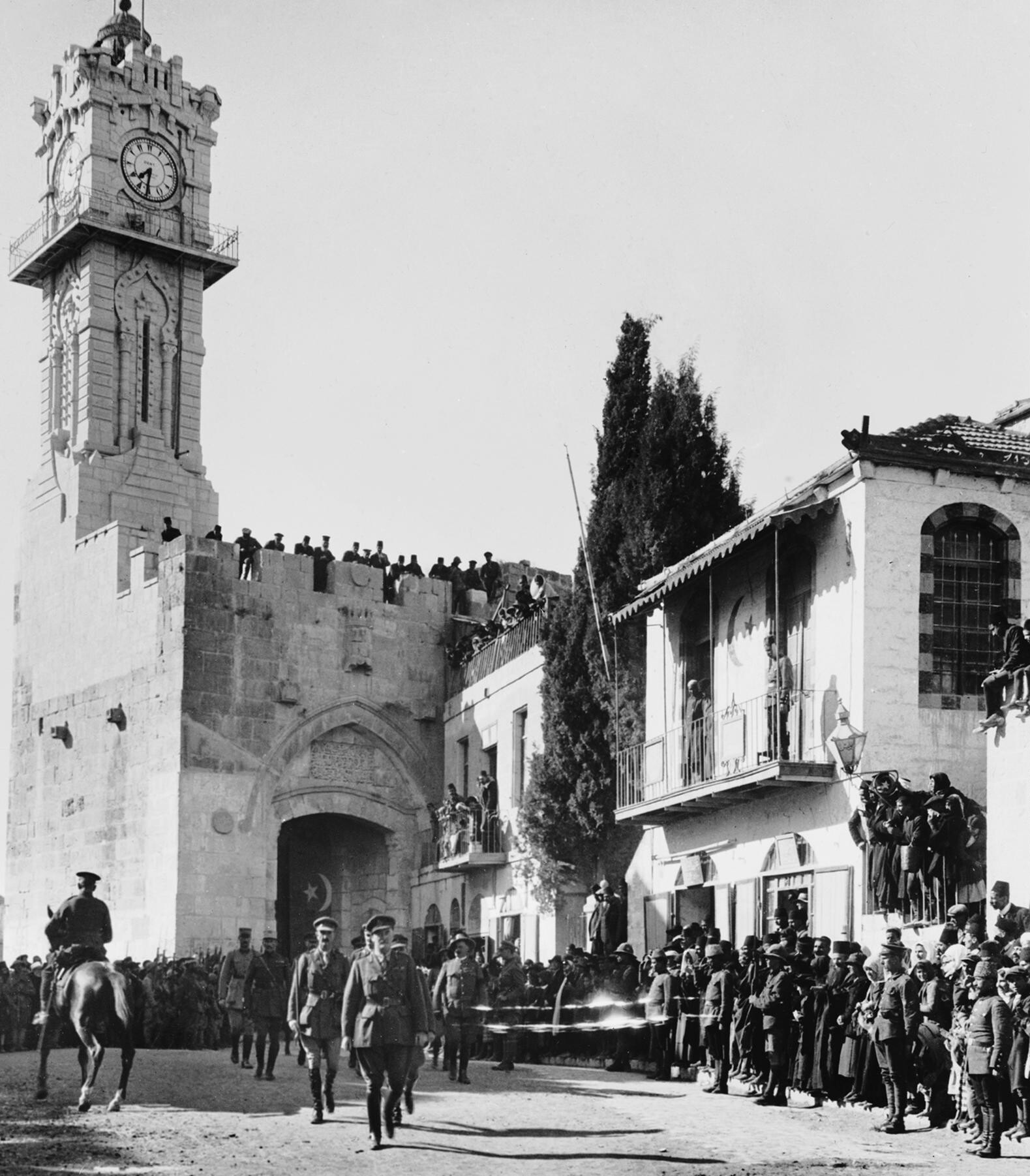
British General Edmund Allenby enters Jerusalem.

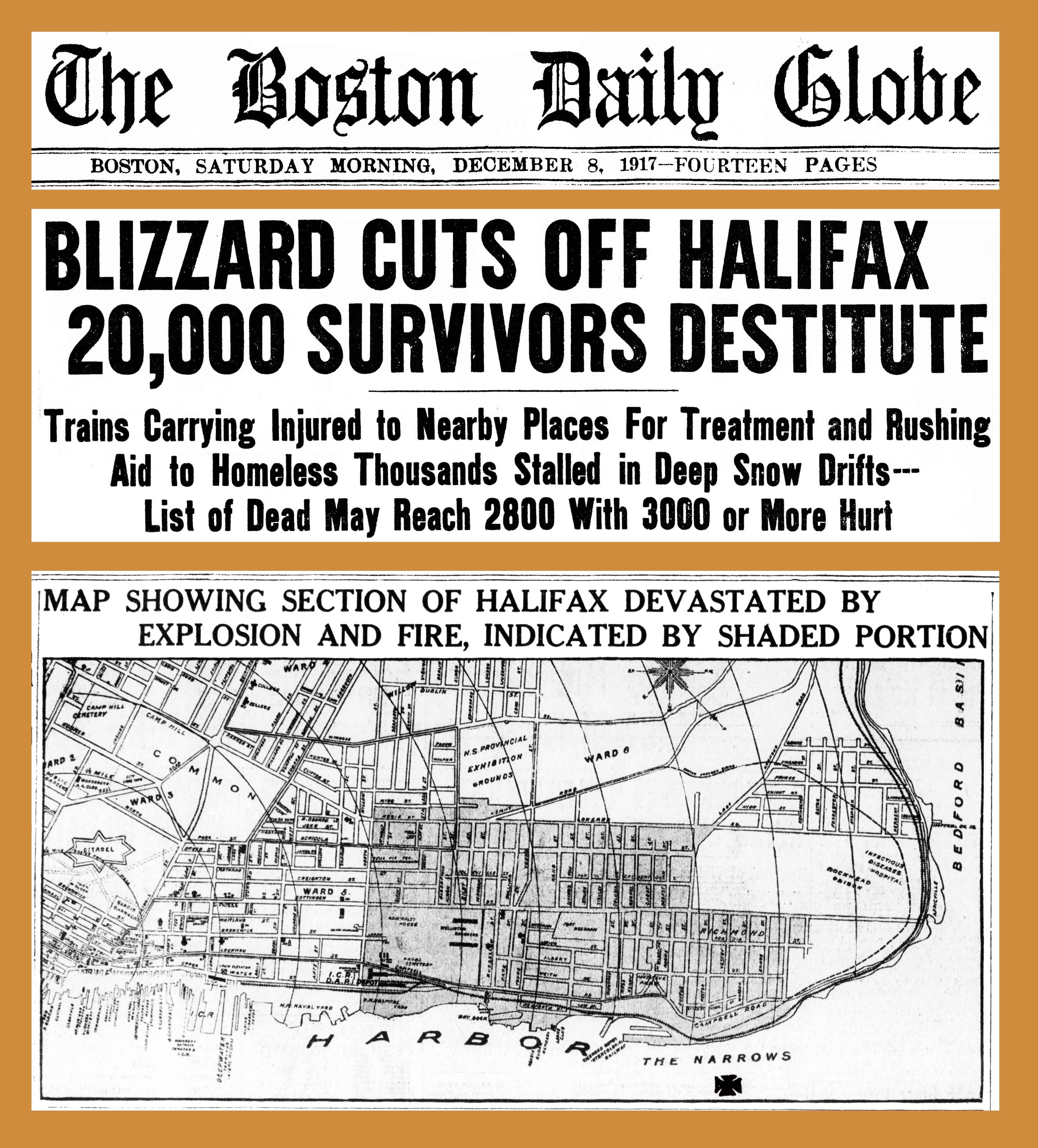
Headline from The Boston Globe on progress to reach survivors of the Halifax Explosion.

The following events occurred in December 1917:

== December 1, 1917 (Saturday) ==
- Battle of Jerusalem – The Yildirim Army Group of the Ottoman Empire clashed with the Egyptian Expeditionary Force at Ell Burj and Nebi Samwil in Palestine but suffered heavy losses in both attacks.
- The British Fourth Army launched a night attack to capture Westroosebeke, Belgium from the Germans in an attempt to secure a winter line for units in Passchendaele but were ultimately repulsed by German defenses, losing 1,689 casualties.
- The Golden Tornado football team of Georgia Tech, which finished with an unbeaten and untied record of 9-0-0, was declared the unofficial champion of the 1917 college football season in the United States by the International News Service (INS) whose "football expert" made a postseason ranking of the Top 10 teams of the year. The INS listed the Pitt Panthers (10-0-0), also unbeaten and untied, in second place and the unbeaten and once-tied Ohio State Buckeyes at third place. The 9-2-0 Penn Quakers (whose only two losses had been to both Georgia Tech and Pitt) were ranked fourth.
- Chilean-born American socialite Blanca Errázuriz was acquitted of the murder of her husband John de Saulles, a celebrity football player and manager turned millionaire through real estate in New York, following a sensational trial that even covered an alleged affair with rising film star Rudolph Valentino. The defense and media portrayed Errázuriz as a victim of a chauvinism during the divorce proceedings and custody battle prior to the couple's argument on August 3 that resulted in her shooting her husband.
- In Madrid, the Spanish newspaper El Sol published its first edition in Madrid.
- The United States Army established the 5th Infantry Division.
- The Royal Flying Corps established air squadrons No. 97 and No. 115.
- The United States Army established the 213th Aero Squadron.
- A severe cold wave in Interior Alaska produced the coldest recorded mean monthly temperatures in the United States. Fort Yukon, Alaska averaged −48.3 °F or −44.6 °C and Eagle, Alaska −46 °F or −43.3 °C.
- Born:
  - Joanne Siegel, American model, wife to Jerry Siegel, inspiration for the character Lois Lane in Superman; as Jolan Kovacs, in Cleveland, United States (d. 2011)
  - Eladio Dieste, Uruguayan architect, best known for his designs for Montevideo Shopping and Christ the Worker Church in Estación Atlántida; in Artigas, Uruguay (d. 2000)

== December 2, 1917 (Sunday) ==
- German submarine SM UB-81 struck a mine and sank in the English Channel off the Isle of Wight then was rammed by a Royal Navy patrol boat with the loss of either 27 of her 34 crew or 29 of her 35 crew (sources differ).
- German fighter ace Walter von Bülow-Bothkamp shot down and killed British ace Harry G. E. Luchford, who had 24 victories at the time of his death. Von Bülow-Bothkamp would be shot down and killed by a British ace just one month later.
- The Norwegian sports club Gjeilo was established in Geilo, Norway before changing to its present name the following year to Geilo. The club has sections on alpine skiing, freestyle skiing, skiing and biathlon, snowboarding, telemark skiing, football, handball and cycling.
- The first official handball match was played in Berlin.

== December 3, 1917 (Monday) ==
- Battle of Cambrai – The German Second Army captured the village of La Vacquerie and pushed British forces back behind the St Quentin canal.
- Battle of Jerusalem – British forces recaptured the Palestinian village of Beit Ur el Foqa they had lost to the Ottomans five days earlier. Ottoman resistance in the Judaean Mountains began to taper off everywhere.
- The New Zealand Division attacked the Polderhoek Spur ridge near Ypres, Belgium but failed to complete their objective. The division held their ground against German counterattacks for a month, amassing a total 1,198 casualties by the end of December.
- Nikolay Dukhonin, the last commander-in-chief of the Imperial Russian Army, was lynched and murdered at a railway station in Mogilev, Belarus after surrendering to Soviet custody. Red Army officer Pavel Dybenko was alleged to have given the order to allow a mob of soldiers and sailors to bayonet Dukhonin to death, then use his corpse as target practice.
- The first prototype of the Beardmore aircraft was flown.
- The North Coast line was extended in New South Wales, Australia, with station Kempsey opened to serve the line.
- Born: Wilhelm Brasse, Polish photographer and Holocaust survivor, known for his photo work during his imprisonment at the Auschwitz concentration camp; in Żywiec, Austria-Hungary (present-day Poland) (d. 2012)

== December 4, 1917 (Tuesday) ==
- U.S. President Woodrow Wilson delivered his State of the Union Address to the 65th United States Congress, which focused on the United States' entry into World War I: "I shall not go back to debate the causes of the war. The intolerable wrongs done and planned against us by the sinister masters of Germany have long since become too grossly obvious and odious to every true American to need to be rehearsed."
- Sfatul Țării, governing council for Bessarabia within the crumbling Russian Empire, held its first session.
- Battle of Jerusalem – British troops found no further resistance on the main road between Hebron and Jerusalem.
- The Philippine Red Cross formed as a chapter of the American Red Cross. It would becomes its own independent organization in 1934.
- Born: Alexander Baron, British writer, author of From the City from the Plough and The Lowlife; as Joseph Alexander Bernstein, in Maidenhead, England (d. 1999)
- Died: Scott Shipp, 78, American army officer, commander of the Virginia Military Institute cadet battalion at the Battle of New Market during the American Civil War (b. 1839)

== December 5, 1917 (Wednesday) ==
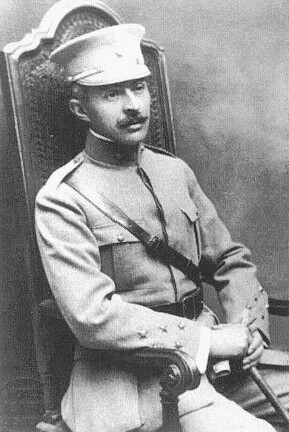
Sidónio Pais, dictator of Portugal.

- The Supreme Soviet of the National Economy, or Vesenkha, was established by decree of the Council of People's Commissars (Sovnarkom) and All-Russian Central Executive Committee of Soviets, for the stated purpose to "plan for the organization of the economic life of the country and the financial resources of the government".
- A military junta led by Sidónio Pais pushed to overthrow the Afonso Costa administration in Portugal.
- After weeks of unfavorable weather, the Luftstreitkräfte (German Air Force) made its first heavier-than-air raid against United Kingdom since October. Nineteen Gotha and two Riesenflugzeug bombers attacked in several waves, causing £100,000 in damage around the London area but inflicting few casualties. British anti-aircraft guns shot down two Gotha bombers and their crews were captured while a third bomber went missing.
- The Ukrainian State Academy of Arts, the first art academy for Ukraine, was established in Kiev with Fedir Krychevsky as the first rector.
- The Finnish daily newspaper Keskipohjanmaa published its first edition.
- Born: Wenche Foss, Norwegian actress, known for stage and film roles including The Master and His Servants and The Pinchcliffe Grand Prix; as Eva Wenche Steenfeldt-Foss, in Kristiania, Norway (present-day Oslo, Norway) (d. 2011)
- Died: Edmund Reid, 71, British law enforcer, head of the Criminal Investigation Department of the Metropolitan Police of London during the Jack the Ripper murders (b. 1846)

== December 6, 1917 (Thursday) ==
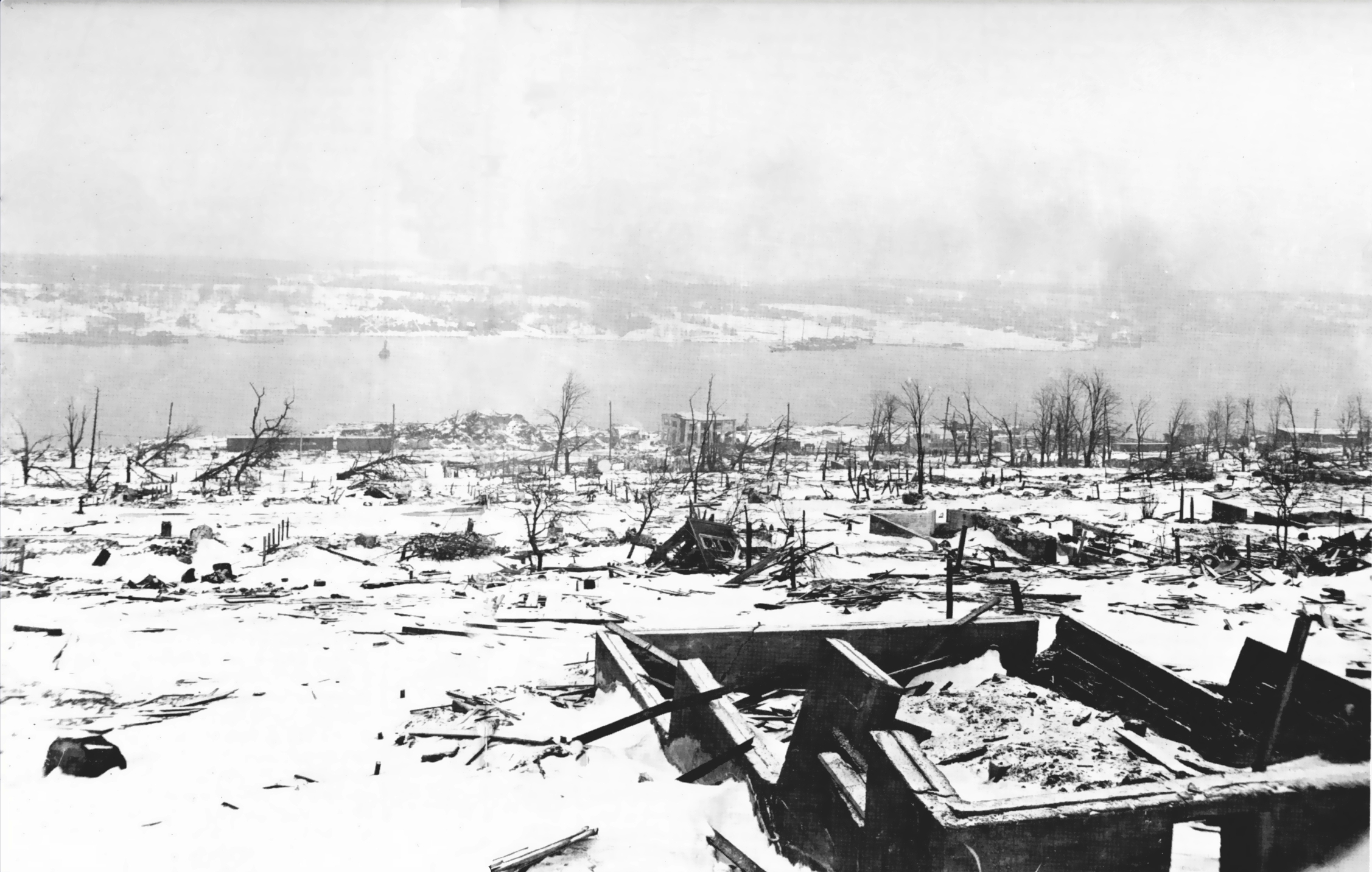
A view of devastated Halifax, Nova Scotia following the explosion after explosives on a crippled ship ignited in the harbour.

- Halifax Explosion – French cargo ship Mont-Blanc, loaded with explosive material, collided with Norwegian ship Imo in Halifax Harbour, Nova Scotia. The collision caused a fire that ignited the explosive material on Mont-Blanc, causing the biggest man-made explosion in recorded history until the Trinity nuclear test in 1945. The massive blast destroyed part of Halifax, killed at least 1,963 people and injured 9,000 more.
  - Vince Coleman, a train dispatcher for Canadian Government Railways in Halifax, stayed at his telegraph office after the collision between Mont-Blanc and Imo to send a stop order on an overnight train from Saint John, New Brunswick that was carrying over 300 passengers from entering the city, saving hundreds of lives. His last telegraph decoded from Morse code was said to have read: "Hold up the train. Ammunition ship afire in harbor making for Pier 6 and will explode. Guess this will be my last message. Good-bye boys." He was killed along with thousands of others in the ensuing blast.
- The Senate of Finland officially declared the country's independence from Russia, with the date continually observed as Independence Day.
- U.S. Navy destroyer USS Jacob Jones was torpedoed and sunk in the Atlantic Ocean south west of the British Isles by German submarine U-53, killing 66 crew in the first significant American naval loss of World War I and first ever U.S. destroyer loss to an enemy. Survivors were rescued by British craft.
- German submarines SM UC-69 and SM U-96 collided off the coast of France, killing 11 of the crew on board UC-69.
- The United States Army established the 7th Infantry Division.
- The first Viru Infantry Battalion was established as part of the Estonian Army.
- The Luftstreitkräfte, the air arm of the Imperial German Army, established air squadron Jagdstaffel 43.
- Chikuhei Nakajima and Seibi Kawanishi founded the Japan Aeroplane Manufacturing Work Company Ltd, the first aircraft manufacturing company in Japan.
- Born:
  - Kamal Jumblatt, Lebanese politician, co-founder and leader of the Lebanese National Movement; in Deir al-Qamar, Ottoman Empire (present-day Lebanon) (d. 1977, assassinated)
  - Irv Robbins, Canadian-born American entrepreneur, co-founder of the ice cream chain Baskin-Robbins; as Irvine Isaac Robbins, in Winnipeg, Canada (d. 2008)
  - Eliane Plewman, French spy, member of the Special Operations Executive; as Eliane Sophie Browne-Bartroli, in Marseille, France (d. 1944, executed at Dachau concentration camp)

== December 7, 1917 (Friday) ==
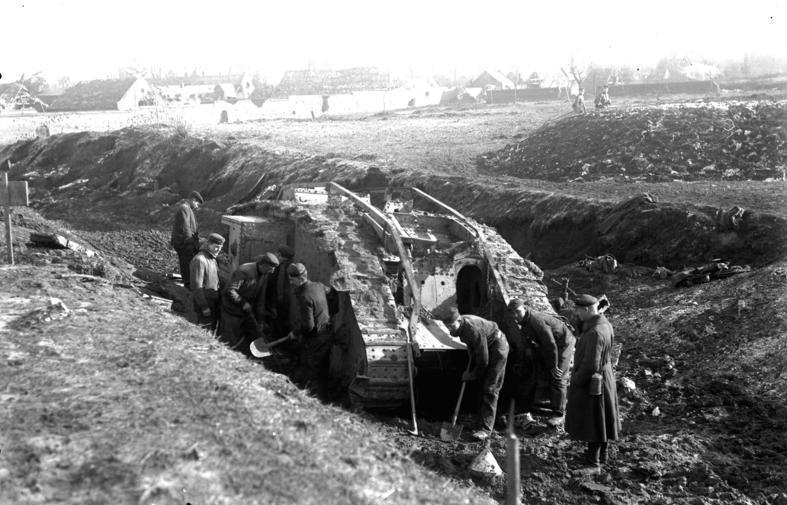
German troops capture a British tank during the Battle of Cambrai.

- The United States declared war on Austria-Hungary.
- The Battle of Cambrai – The British gave up further positions to the Germans before the general operation was called off.
  - German casualties were estimated between c. 40,000 casualties to c. 53,000 German casualties. British casualties were recorded as 47,596, including 9,000 men taken prisoner.
  - German command credited the use of ten ground-attack air squadrons in providing close air support to ground forces during the 17-day battle, for playing a key role in halting the British advance and convincing the Luftstreitkräfte of the need for a permanent ground-attack force.
- Canadian naval vessel Simcoe foundered and sank in the Gulf of St. Lawrence, with a loss of 44 crew.
- The province of Romblon was re-established in the Philippines.
- Japanese food manufacturer Kikkoman, most noted for its soy and seasoning products, was founded in Noda, Chiba, Japan through the merging of eight businesses owned and operated by the Mogi and Takanashi families.
- Born: Hurd Hatfield, American actor, best known for the lead title role in The Picture of Dorian Gray; as William Rukard Hurd Hatfield, in New York City, United States (d. 1998)
- Died:
  - Ludwig Minkus, 91, Austrian composer, best known for ballet compositions La source, Don Quixote and La Bayadère (b. 1826)
  - Ann Eliza Young, 73, American activist, former wife of Brigham Young and early advocate for women's rights (b. 1844)

== December 8, 1917 (Saturday) ==
- Battle of Jerusalem – The Yildirim Army Group of the Ottoman Empire abandoned Jerusalem in the face of advancing Egyptian Expeditionary Force.
- After three days of insurrection, Portuguese prime minister Afonso Costa handed power over to Sidónio Pais.
- Born:
  - Nisse Strinning, Swedish architect and designer, best known for kitchen and book shelf designs; as Nils Strinning, in Kramfors, Sweden (d. 2006)
  - Ian Johnson, Australian cricketer, bowler for the Victoria cricket team and the Australia national cricket team from 1935 to 1956; in North Melbourne, Victoria, Australia (d. 1998)
  - Alan Stewart, New Zealand academic, 1st Vice-chancellor of Massey University; in Auckland, New Zealand (d. 2004)
- Died: Mendele Mocher Sforim, 81, Russian Yiddish and Hebrew writer, co-founder of the Yiddish periodical Kol Mevasser (b. 1836)

== December 9, 1917 (Sunday) ==
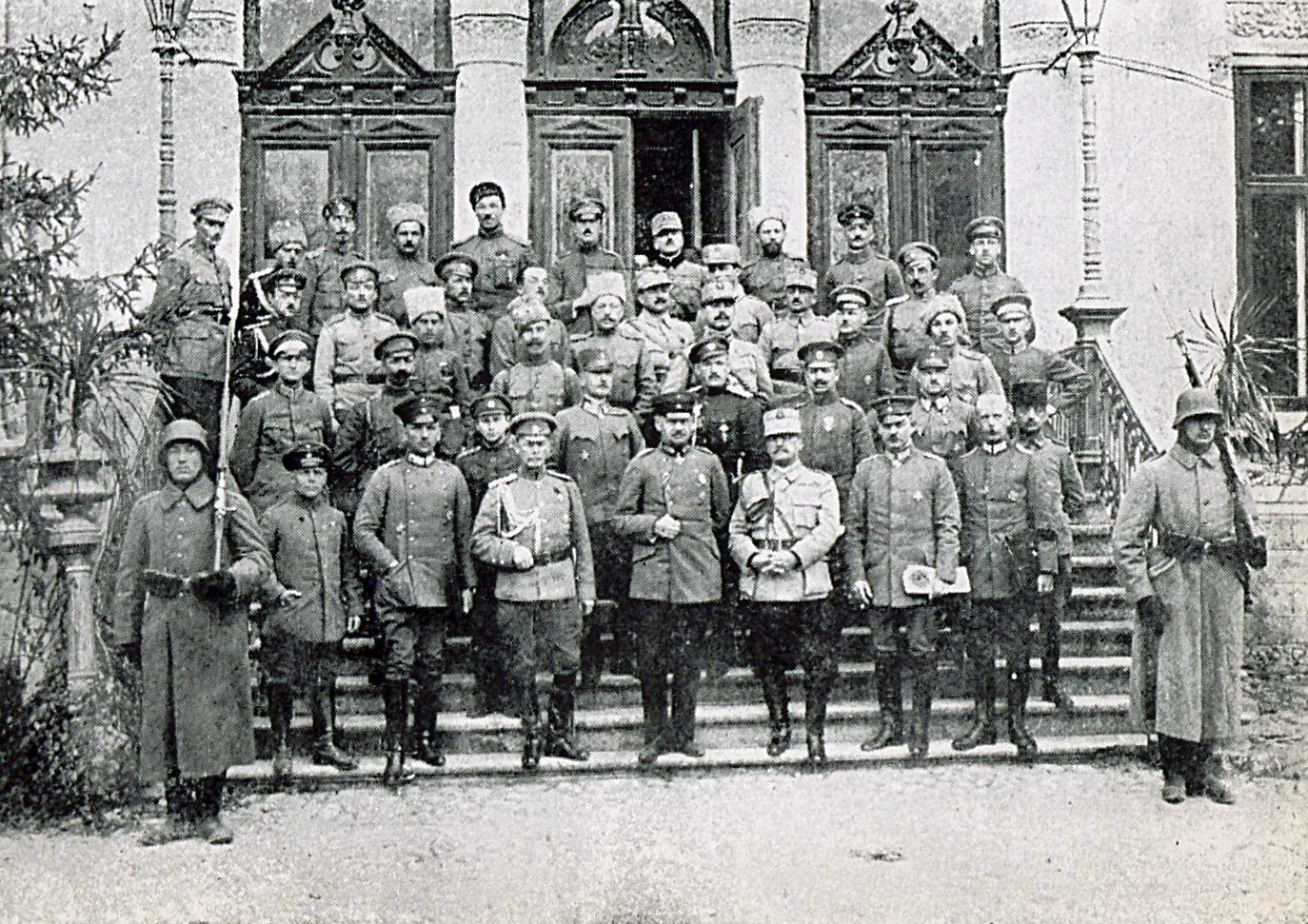
Delegates from Romania and the Central Powers following the signing of an armistice.

- Romania signed an armistice with the Central Powers, withdrawing from participation in World War I.
- Battle of Jerusalem – The British Egyptian Expeditionary Force accepted a letter of surrender of Jerusalem delivered by the mayor, Hussein al-Husayni, on behalf of the Ottoman Governor of Palestine.
- German submarine SM UB-18 was rammed and sunk in the English Channel by a Royal Navy patrol boat with the loss of all 24 crew.
- Wexford beat Clare 0-9 and 0-5 to win its third All-Ireland Senior Football Championship title in Croke Park, Dublin.
- Born:
  - James Jesus Angleton, American intelligence officer, chief of CIA Counterintelligence from 1954 to 1975; in Boise, Idaho, United States (d. 1987)
  - James Rainwater, American physicist, recipient of the Nobel Prize in Physics for his research in atomic physics; as Leo James Rainwater, in Council, Idaho, United States (d. 1986)
- Died: Nat M. Wills, 44, American vaudeville entertainer, best known for his early vaudeville recordings including "No News" which is preserved by the Library of Congress (b. 1873)

== December 10, 1917 (Monday) ==
- Panama declared war on Austria-Hungary as part of its alliance with the United States.
- The Nobel Prize Committee selected British physicist Charles Glover Barkla as recipient for the Nobel Prize in Physics while Danish authors Karl Adolph Gjellerup and Henrik Pontoppidan shared the Nobel Prize in Literature. The International Committee of the Red Cross was awarded the Nobel Peace Prize for its humanitarian efforts throughout World War I.
- Austro-Hungarian naval ship SMS Wien was torpedoed and sunk at Trieste, Italy by two Italian torpedo boats under command of Luigi Rizzo with the loss of 46 of her 469 crew.
- German submarine SM UB-75 struck a mine and sank in the North Sea with the loss of all 34 crew.
- Harry Marshall Erskine Evans was elected 14th Mayor of Edmonton after earning half of the vote in the Alberta city's municipal election.
- The Junkers J 8 was first flown and in three months would be used by Germany as attack aircraft.
- The Tata Oil Mills Company was established as a subsidiary manufacturer for the Tata Group in Bombay.
- Born: Yahya Petra of Kelantan, Malaysian state leader, 6th Yang di-Pertuan Agong (state monarch of Malaysia); in Kota Bharu, Unfederated Malay States (present-day Malaysia) (d. 1979)
- Died: Mackenzie Bowell, 93, Canadian state leader, 5th Prime Minister of Canada (b. 1823)

== December 11, 1917 (Tuesday) ==
- Battle of Jerusalem – British General Edmund Allenby led units of the Egyptian Expeditionary Force into Jerusalem on foot through the Jaffa Gate, instead of a traditional entrance on horse or by vehicle, as a show of respect for the holy city.
- Bernardino Machado, President of Portugal, was forced from power and replaced by Sidónio Pais, giving him complete control of the country.
- The Luftstreitkräfte established air squadrons Jagdstaffel 44, 45, and 46.
- Born: Max-Hellmuth Ostermann, German air force officer, commander of Jagdgeschwader 54 for the Luftwaffe during World War II, recipient of the Knight's Cross of the Iron Cross; in Hamburg, German Empire (present-day Germany) (d. 1942, killed in action)

== December 12, 1917 (Wednesday) ==
- At least 543 people were killed and hundreds more injured after an overloaded troop train derailed on the Culoz–Modane railway near Saint-Michel-de-Maurienne in the French Alps, making it the single worst train disaster in French history.
- The Idel-Ural State was established in Kazan within the dissolving Russian Empire.
- The Royal Australian Navy battlecruiser HMAS Australia was damaged in a collision with the British cruiser HMS Repulse.
- The motorboat USS Elizabeth (SP-972) collided with the steamship Northland in Norfolk Harbor and sank, killing 2 crewmembers.
- A fire aboard the ocean-going tug USS Chemung (AT-18) killed 3 sailors.
- Father Edward J. Flanagan, a Catholic priest, founded Boys Town orphanage in the village of the same name near Omaha, Nebraska.
- The first prototype of the Beardmore aircraft was flown.
- Born: Alan Deere, New Zealand air force officer, commander of the No. 403 Squadron among his commands during World War II, recipient of the Order of the British Empire, Distinguished Service Order and Distinguished Flying Cross from both the United Kingdom and United States, author of Nine Lives; in Auckland, New Zealand (d. 1995)
- Died:
  - Andrew Taylor Still, 89, American physician, credited as the "father of osteopathy" in the United States (b. 1828)
  - Charles Bowen, 87, Irish-New Zealand politician, 13th Speaker of the New Zealand Legislative Council (b. 1830)

== December 13, 1917 (Thursday) ==
- The Crimean People's Republic was established. As the area in 1917 was predominantly Muslim, it became the world's first secular Muslim state to declare sovereignty.
- The Kazakhs declared independence from Russia and established the Alash Autonomy in what is now present-day Kazakhstan. The nation-state would last until 1920 when it was absorbed into the Soviet Union.
- Royal Navy armed steamship HMS Stephen Furness was sunk in the Irish Sea west of the Isle of Man by German Submarine SM UB-64 with the loss of 101 lives.
- A judicial inquiry into the Halifax Explosion was held at the Halifax Court House. It released a report the following February concluding the captain and crew of the Mont-Blanc were responsible for causing the collision that eventually started the explosion.
- German submarine SM U-75, which sank British cruiser HMS Hampshire which had been carrying Secretary of State for War Herbert Kitchener in 1915, struck a mine and sank in the North Sea with the loss of 23 of her crew.
- The first edition of The Capital Times daily newspaper was released in Madison, Wisconsin.
- Born:
  - John Hart, American actor, best known as the second Ranger in the 1950s television Western The Lone Ranger; in Los Angeles, United States (d. 2009)
  - Miron Constantinescu, Romanian politician, leading member of the Romanian Communist Party; in Chișinău, Kingdom of Romania (present-day Moldova) (d. 1974)

== December 14, 1917 (Friday) ==
- French cruiser Châteaurenault was torpedoed and sunk in the Mediterranean Sea by German submarine SM UC-38 before itself was sunk by French destroyer Lansquenet. Some 1,162 survivors from the Châteaurenault and 20 survivors from the UC-38 were rescued by Lansquenet and fellow destroyers Mameluck and Rouen.
- The U.S. Marines established the 3rd Marine Expeditionary Brigade.
- The U.S. Navy destroyer Kimberly was launched by the Fore River Shipyard in Quincy, Massachusetts. The ship primarily protected Allied shipping around the United Kingdom and Europe during World War I.
- The village of Robbins, Illinois was incorporated.
- A solar eclipse occurred over part of Antarctic and South Pacific.
- Died: George Wilson, 30, New Zealand cricketer, bowler for the New Zealand national cricket team and Canterbury cricket team from 1913 to 1914; killed in action at the Ypres Salient (b. 1887)

== December 15, 1917 (Saturday) ==
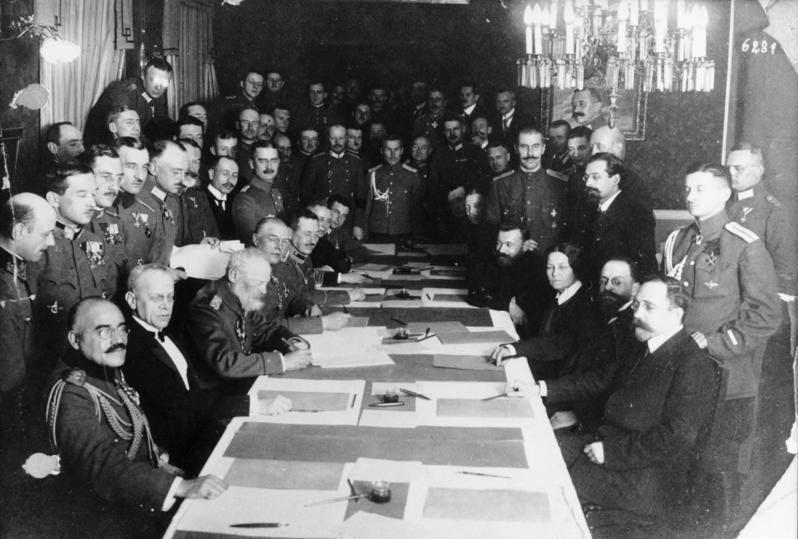
Delegates from Russia and the Central Powers signing an armistice.

- Russia and the Central Powers agreed to an armistice, ending the fighting on the Eastern Front.
- The Moldavian Democratic Republic was established with Ion Inculeț as president.
- Cargo ship SS Formby bound for Waterford from Liverpool was torpedoed and sunk in the Irish Sea by German submarine U-62 with the loss of all 35 crew.
- The Luftstreitkräfte established air squadron Jagdstaffel 78.
- The U.S. Army established the 93rd Infantry Division.
- The German army command Armee-Abteilung Woyrsch was dissolved after the Imperial German Army achieved victory on the Eastern Front.
- U.S. Navy destroyer Fairfax was launched by the Mare Island Naval Shipyard in Vallejo, California. The ship was eventually sold to the Royal Navy after World War I.
- Born:
  - Gregers Gram, Norwegian resistance fighter, officer with Norwegian Independent Company 1 during German occupation of Norway in World War II; in Kristiania, Norway (present-day Oslo, Norway) (d. 1944, killed in action)
  - Owen Snedden, New Zealand clergy, Archbishop of the Roman Catholic Archdiocese of Wellington from 1962 to 1981; in Auckland, New Zealand (d. 1981)
- Died: Bernard J. D. Irwin, 87, American army medical officer, first recipient of the Medal of Honor for action during the Apache Wars (b. 1830)

== December 16, 1917 (Sunday) ==
- Bolshevik forces captured Sevastopol in an attempt to regain control of Crimea three days after the region declared independence.
- The Luftstreitkräfte established air squadron Jagdstaffel 47.
- U.S. Navy destroyer Sigourney was launched by the Fore River Shipyard in Quincy, Massachusetts. The ship was eventually sold to the Royal Navy after World War I.
- Cecil B. DeMille released The Devil-Stone, the second romantic film of the year starring Geraldine Farrar. It became the sixth top-grossing film of the year. Two copies of the film survive with the American Film Institute and the Library of Congress.
- Born:
  - Arthur C. Clarke, British science-fiction writer and inventor, author of Childhood's End, Rendezvous with Rama and the screenplay for 2001: A Space Odyssey, leading proponent in the development of the geosynchronous satellite; in Minehead, England (d. 2008)
  - Nabi Bakhsh Baloch, Pakistani literary scholar, leading researcher and critic on Sindh poetry and other literary writing; in Sanghar District, British India (present-day Pakistan) (d. 2011)
  - Pete Cenarrusa, American politician, Secretary of State of Idaho from 1967 to 2003; in Carey, Idaho, United States (d. 2013)
- Died: Yosef Lishansky, 26-27, Russian-Jewish spy, member of the Nili espionage ring in the Ottoman Empire; executed (b. 1890)

== December 17, 1917 (Monday) ==
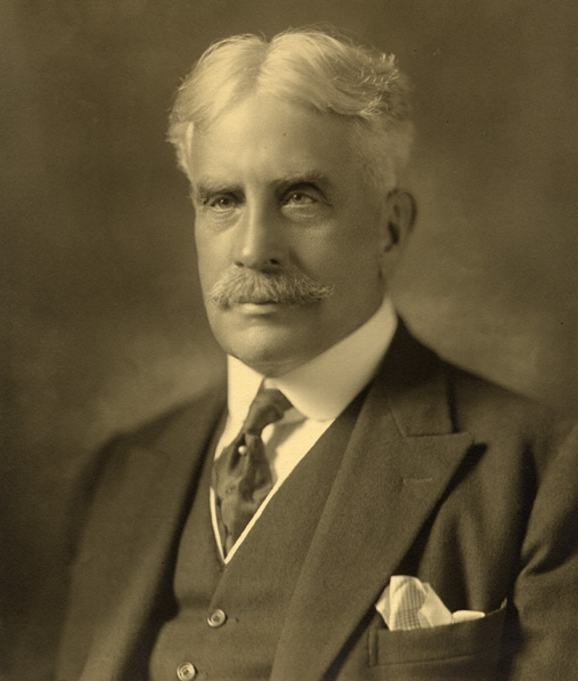
Robert Borden, Prime Minister of Canada

- Robert Borden won a second consecutive majority in the Canadian federal election, defeating opposition leader and former prime minister Wilfrid Laurier with 57 per cent of the vote.
- The All-Ukrainian Congress of Soviets was established as the governing body of the Ukrainian Soviet Socialist Republic.
- The Raad van Vlaanderen (Council of Flanders), a quasi-governmental body of the Flemish Movement in German-occupied Belgium, proclaimed the independence of Flanders.
- U.S. Navy submarines USS F-1 and USS F-3 collided off the coast of California, killing 19 of the 22 crew on F-1.
- A bomb was set off behind the Governor's Mansion in Sacramento, California while Governor William Stephens was home. No one was injured though the mansion had extensive damage. The subsequent investigation led to a crackdown against the trade union Industrial Workers of the World, which had been protesting the conviction trial and conviction of Thomas Mooney for the 1916 Preparedness Day Bombing in San Francisco.
- Born: Kriangsak Chamanan, Thai state leader, 15th Prime Minister of Thailand; as Somchit Chamanan, in Nakhon Chai Si, Tawantok, Siam (present-day Mueang Samut Sakhon, Samut Sakhon province, Thailand) (d. 2003)
- Died:
  - Elizabeth Garrett Anderson, 81, British physician, politician and suffragist, first woman in the United Kingdom to qualify as physician and a surgeon, as well as first to be elected to a school board or to hold the title of mayor in the country (b. 1836)
  - Ber Borochov, 36, Russian linguist and activist, founding member of Labor Zionism; died of pneumonia (b. 1881)
  - Charles P. Rogers, 88, American industrialist, founder of bed manufacturer Charles P Rogers & Co. (b. 1829)
  - Frank Gotch, 39, American wrestler, World Heavyweight Wrestling Champion from 1908 to 1913 (b. 1877)

== December 18, 1917 (Tuesday) ==
- The Armistice of Erzincan was signed between the Ottoman Empire and states under Transcaucasian Commissariat (a government body created following the October Revolution) which temporarily ended fighting on the Caucasian and Persian Fronts until February 12, 1918.
- The United States Army established the 163d, 166th, and 168th Aero Squadrons.
- German film company Universum-Film was established in Berlin, and later evolved into the media company UFA.
- Auto manufacturer Palmer-Moore Company was officially put for sale at public auction in Syracuse, New York and sold the following March.
- Born: Ossie Davis, American actor, best known for his collaborations with directors Melvin Van Peebles, Gordon Parks, and Spike Lee, including Do the Right Thing and Jungle Fever, recipient with wife Ruby Dee of the National Medal of Arts; as Raiford Chatman Davis, in Clinch County, Georgia, United States (d. 2005)

== December 19, 1917 (Wednesday) ==
- German submarine SM UB-56 struck a mine and sank in the Strait of Dover with the loss of all 37 crew.
- British flying ace Richard Maybery died after his airplane went down near Haynecourt, France. He had 21 confirmed kills and five shared victories at the time of his death.
- The actual first National Hockey League game was played between the Montreal Wanderers and the Toronto Arenas, with Montreal winning 10-9. Wanderers defenceman Dave Ritchie scored the league's first goal and goalie Bert Lindsay earned the first win. The game started fifteen minutes before the "official first game" of the league between the Montreal Canadiens and Ottawa Senators, with Montreal beating Ottawa 7-4 in part to five goals scored by Canadiens centre Joe Malone.
- Born: Paul Brinegar, American actor, best known for his character roles in the television Westerns The Life and Legend of Wyatt Earp, Rawhide, and Lancer; in Tucumcari, New Mexico, United States (d. 1995)

== December 20, 1917 (Thursday) ==
- Battle of Jaffa – The British 21st Corps attacked the Yildirim Army Group of the Ottoman Empire threatening the British-held port of Jaffa, Palestine.
- A train wreck in Shepherdsville, Kentucky killed 49 people and left an equal number injured, making it the deadliest train accident in the state's history.
- The second referendum on the issue of military conscription was held in Australia, ending with it being defeated as was in the case of the first.
- The Cheka, a predecessor to the KGB, was established in Russia after a decree issued by Vladimir Lenin.
- The Royal Flying Corps established air squadrons No. 188 and No. 189.
- The city of Assisi was established when it separated from Platina in Brazil.
- Catholic clergy Daniel Mannix became a Catholic archbishop of Melbourne, after which he publicly came out in support of Sinn Féin.
- The Chequers Estate Act received royal assent, designating the Chequers manor near Ellesborough, England as the official country residence of the Prime Minister of the United Kingdom.
- The United States Army established Camp Merritt, New Jersey to handle 42,000 enlisted men.
- Born:
  - David Bohm, American physiologist, known for theories applying quantum theory to psychology; in Wilkes-Barre, Pennsylvania, United States (d. 1992)
  - Audrey Totter, American actress, best known for her film noir roles in Main Street After Dark and The Postman Always Rings Twice; in Joliet, Illinois, United States (d. 2013)
  - Billy Drake, British air force pilot, commander of the No. 128 and No. 112 Squadrons during World War II, recipient of the Distinguished Service Order and the Distinguished Flying Cross from both the United Kingdom and the United States; in London, England (d. 2011)
  - Petrus Hugo, South African air force officer, commander of the No. 41 and No. 615 Squadrons during World War II, recipient of the Distinguished Flying Cross from both the United Kingdom and United States; in Pampoenpoort, Union of South Africa (present-day South Africa) (d. 1986)
- Died:
  - Eric Campbell, 38, Scottish actor, best known for co-starring with Charlie Chaplin in several comedies including The Floorwalker, Easy Street and The Immigrant; killed in a car accident (b. 1879)
  - Frederick McCubbin, 62, Australian painter, member of the Heidelberg School (b. 1855)
  - Lucien Petit-Breton, 35, French cyclist, winner of the Tour de France in 1907 and 1908; killed in action (b. 1882)

== December 21, 1917 (Friday) ==
- Battle of Jaffa – The British 21st Corps successfully drove off Ottoman units with a bayonet attack, securing Jaffa with the capture of the village of Rantieh just east of the Palestinian port.
- Born:
  - Heinrich Böll, German writer, recipient of the Nobel Prize in Literature; in Cologne, German Empire (present-day Germany) (d. 1985)
  - Noah Adamia, Soviet sniper, recipient of the Hero of the Soviet Union for action at the Siege of Sevastopol during World War II; in Mathondhzi, Transcaucasian Commissariat (present-day Georgia) (d. 1942, killed in action)
- Died: Wilhelm Trübner, 66, German painter, known of realist paintings including The Death of Pope Alexander VI (b. 1851)

== December 22, 1917 (Saturday) ==
- The United States Guards were formed by the Militia Bureau for domestic security.
- Deutsches Institut für Normung, or German Institute for Standardization, was established in Berlin.
- The Ise Electric Railway extended the Nagoya Line in the Mie Prefecture, Japan, with stations Kusu, Mida, and Ise-Wakamatsu serving the line.
- Born:
  - Frankie Darro, American voice actor and stunt artist, best known as the voice of Lampwick in the Disney film Pinocchio; as Frank Johnson, Jr., in Chicago, United States (d. 1976)
  - Freddie Francis, British cinematographer and film director, recipient of two Academy Awards in cinematography for Sons and Lovers and Glory; as Frederick William Francis, in London, England (d. 2007)
  - Gene Rayburn, American game show host, better known as the host for Match Game; as Eugene Peter Jeljenic, in Christopher, Illinois, United States (d. 1999)
- Died: Frances Xavier Cabrini, 67, American nun, founder of the Missionary Sisters of the Sacred Heart, first American canonized as a saint by Pope Pius XII in 1946 (b. 1850)

== December 23, 1917 (Sunday) ==
- A local plebiscite supported transferring the communities of Narva and Ivangorod (Jaanilinn) from Petrograd Governorate to the Autonomous Governorate of Estonia.
- Three Royal Navy destroyers - HMS Surprise, HMS Tornado, and HMS Torrent - were destroyed when their squadron ran into a minefield in the North Sea off the coast of the Netherlands. In total, 12 officers and 240 crewmen were killed from the three ships. Only British destroyer Radiant survived to pick up the remaining survivors.
- New Zealand flying ace Clive Franklyn Collett was killed in a plane crash following a test flight of a captured German Albatros. He had 11 victories to his credit.
- The Luftstreitkräfte established air squadrons Jagdstaffel 49 and 50.
- American actress Marion Davies made her screen debut in the comedy adventure Runaway, Romany, directed by George Lederer.
- Anglo-French Convention of 1917 on dividing south of the former Russian Empire into the French and British "zones of activity", laying ground for the Allied intervention in the Russian Civil War with a goal of countering the Bolsheviks and German interests.
- Born:
  - Sophie Masloff, American politician, 56th Mayor of Pittsburgh, first woman and Jew to hold the mayoral seat; as Sophie Friedman, in Pittsburgh, United States (d. 2014)
  - Eberle Schultz, American football player, guard for Oregon State University and Philadelphia Eagles, Pittsburgh Steelers and Cleveland Rams from 1939 to 1947; in Eugene, Oregon, United States (d. 2002)

== December 24, 1917 (Monday) ==
- The first All-Ukrainian Congress of Soviets took place in Kharkiv, with initially 964 participants which later grew to 1250. It approved the Treaty of Brest-Litovsk between Russia and Central Powers and declared the nation state of the Ukrainian Soviet Socialist Republic. The All-Ukrainian Central Executive Committee was also established with 41 members and Yukhym Medvedev as chair.
- Royal Navy vessel HMS Penshurst was torpedoed and sunk in the Bristol Channel by German submarine SM U-110 with the loss of two crew.
- The British Army established the 18th Indian Division to serve in the Mesopotamian campaign.
- The Western Bucking Broadway, the sixth feature film directed by John Ford, was released by Universal Film. The film was found and restored by the National Center of Cinematography in Paris in 2002.
- Died:
  - Ivan Goremykin, 78, Russian state leader, 2nd and 5th Prime Minister of Russia (b. 1839)
  - Francis G. Newlands, 71, American politician, U.S. Representative of Nevada from 1893 to 1903, U.S. Senator from Nevada from 1903 to 1917 (b. 1846)

== December 25, 1917 (Tuesday) ==
- Soviet–Ukrainian War – A Bolshevik uprising against the Central Council of Ukraine occurred in Aleksandrovsk, Ukraine. It was put down three days later.
- German submarine SM U-87 was rammed and then sunk with depth charges by Royal Navy patrol ships in the Irish Sea with the loss of all 44 crew.
- Brite Ranch raid – Mexican raiders attacked a ranch in Presidio County, Texas, resulting in four deaths. It is still debated whether the raiders were loyal to Pancho Villa or Venustiano Carranza.
- Jesse Lynch Williams' Why Marry?, the first dramatic play to win a Pulitzer Prize, opened at the Astor Theatre in New York City, with Estelle Winwood leading the cast.
- Born:
  - Yusuf al-Khal, Syrian-Lebanese poet, known for his poems including "The Deserted Well", co-founder of the poetry magazine Shi'r; in Amar al-Husn, Syria (d. 1987)
  - Klavdia Fomicheva, Russian air force officer, noted female bomber commander for the Soviet Air Forces during World War II, recipient of the Hero of the Soviet Union; in Moscow, Russian Republic (present-day Russia) (d. 1958)
  - Lincoln Verduga Loor, Ecuadorian journalist and politician, member of the Senate of Ecuador from 1967 to 1968; in Chone, Ecuador (d. 2009)
  - John Minton, English painter, best known for his popular book cover illustrations for publisher John Lehmann; as Francis John Minton, in Great Shelford, England (d. 1957)

== December 26, 1917 (Wednesday) ==
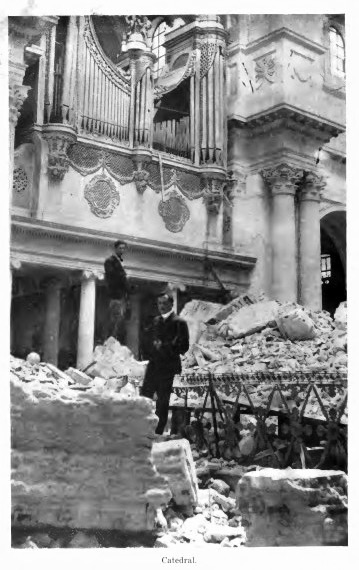
The Guatemala City Cathedral after an earthquake struck the Guatemala.

- An earthquake measuring 6.0 in magnitude struck Guatemala and destroyed thousands of homes and public buildings in Guatemala City, as well as wrecking the historic ruins of Antigua Guatemala. It was the worst earthquake of the year in terms of death toll, with 2,650 people reported killed.
- Brite Ranch raid – An American cavalry force of 200 men pursued the Mexican raiders that besieged a Texas ranch the day before, killing 10 raiders and recovering some of the stolen horses and supplies.
- U.S. President Woodrow Wilson used the Federal Possession and Control Act to place most U.S. railroads under the United States Railroad Administration, hoping to transport troops and materials for the war effort more efficiently.
- Born: Rose Mary Woods, American administrator, Secretary for U.S. President Richard Nixon; in Sebring, Ohio, United States (d. 2005)

== December 27, 1917 (Thursday) ==
- The Imperial German Army established the 18th Army to serve on the Western Front. It was dissolved in 1919.
- The Luftstreitkräfte established air squadrons Jagdstaffel 51, 52, and 53.
- U.S. Navy destroyer Rathburne was launched by William Cramp & Sons in Philadelphia.
- The village of Hughenden, Alberta was incorporated.
- Born:
  - Jimmy McAlinden, Irish football player and coach, played forward for numerous clubs including Southend and the Ireland national football team from 1934 to 1955, coached for Glenavon, Lisburn and Drogheda from 1954 to 1978; as James McAlinden, in Belfast, Ireland (present-day Northern Ireland) (d. 1993)
  - Buddy Boudreaux, American jazz musician, known for his collaborations with Jimmy Dorsey, Bob Crosby, Warren Covington and others; as John Landry Boudreaux, in Donaldsonville, Louisiana, United States (d. 2015)

== December 28, 1917 (Friday) ==
- Canadian fighter ace Alfred Edwin McKay was shot down by German ace Carl Menckhoff during a dogfight over Belgium. Listed as deceased, he had earned 10 confirmed victories one month prior to his death.
- The 8th Brigade of the Royal Flying Corps was created by raising the 41st Wing to brigade status, with Brigadier-General C. L. N. Newall as commander.
- American journalist H. L. Mencken published a fictitious historical account of the bathtub in the New York Evening Mail, including accounts of the White House installing a bathtub in 1842. Although a complete hoax, parts of the historical account have been presented as fact as recently as 2008. Mencken later wrote: "The success of this idle hoax, done in time of war, when more serious writing was impossible, vastly astonished me."
- The city of Lanco, Chile was incorporated.
- Born: Ellis Clarke, Trinidadian state leader, first President of Trinidad and Tobago; in Belmont, Trinidad and Tobago (d. 2010)

== December 29, 1917 (Saturday) ==
- The American Association of Teachers of Spanish was established in New York City for assist teachers who used Spanish in their classrooms. The name was changed to include Portuguese in its title when the language was added to the organization's mission statement in 1944.
- Born:
  - Ramanand Sagar, Indian film and television director, best known for the Indian television series Ramayan, recipient of the Padma Shri; as Chandramauli Chopra, in Lahore, British India (present-day Pakistan) (d. 2005)
  - Tom Bradley, American politician, 38th Mayor of Los Angeles; in Calvert, Texas, United States (d. 1998)

== December 30, 1917 (Sunday) ==
- Battle of Jerusalem – The Egyptian Expeditionary Force secured their victory by successfully defending Jerusalem from numerous Yildirim Army Group counterattacks, inflicting 1,000 Ottoman casualties and capturing 750 prisoners.
- German submarine SM UC-34 torpedoed and sank Royal Navy troopship Aragon in the Mediterranean Sea off Alexandria, Egypt, killing 610 people. The sub then struck and sank Royal Navy destroyer HMS Attack while it was rescuing survivors, killing 10 more sailors out of the crew of 70.
- British opera singer Mary Garden made her screen debut in historical drama Thais. Based on the novel by Anatole France, it was directed by Hugo Ballin and Frank Hall Crane, and released through Goldwyn Pictures. Although Garden was a major star, the film became one the biggest box office flops of the decade.
- Born:
  - Yun Dong-ju, Korean poet, known for his protest poetry, including Sky, Wind, Star and Poem, during Japanese occupation in World War II; in Longjing, Jilin, Republic of China (present-day China) (d. 1945, died in prison)
  - Lachhiman Gurung, Nepalese soldier, recipient of the Victoria Cross for action during the Burma campaign in World War II; in Tanahun District, Kingdom of Nepal (present-day Nepal) (d. 2010)
  - Seymour Melman, American engineer and economist, author of The Permanent War Economy and Pentagon Capitalism; in New York City, United States (d. 2004)
- Died: Gustaf Nyström, 61, Finnish architect, best known for his ground-breaking urban planning of the Kallio and Töölö neighborhoods in Helsinki (b. 1856)

== December 31, 1917 (Monday) ==
- The British government imposed rationing of sugar to eight ounces per person per week.
- Born:
  - Joan McCracken, American actress and dancer, best known for her Broadway hits including original cast member of Oklahoma!, Bloomer Girl, and Billion Dollar Baby; in Philadelphia, United States (d. 1961)
  - Wilfrid Noyce, English mountaineer, member of the 1953 British Mount Everest expedition; as Cuthbert Wilfrid Francis Noyce, in Simla, British India (present-day Shimla, India) (d. 1962, killed in a mountaineering accident)
