= Loor =

Loor or de Loor is a surname. It may be a Dutch or Flemish occupational surname meaning 'peddler, or 'ragman'. It may also be a surname of Spanish origin. Notable people with the surname include:

- Barbara de Loor (born 1974), Dutch speed skater
- Cristhian Loor (born 2006), Ecuadorian footballer
- Isidore De Loor, Belgian professed religious
- Ivan Loor (born 1955), Russian politician
- Julio Mendoza Loor, Ecuadorean dressage rider
- Layan Loor, Ecuadorian footballer
- Lincoln Verduga Loor, Ecuadorian journalist and politician
- Tatiana Loor (born 1991), Ecuadorian beauty pageant titleholder
- Viljar Loor (1953–2011), Estonian volleyball player
