= Night action of 1/2 December 1917 =

- Part of the Third Battle of Ypres of the First World War
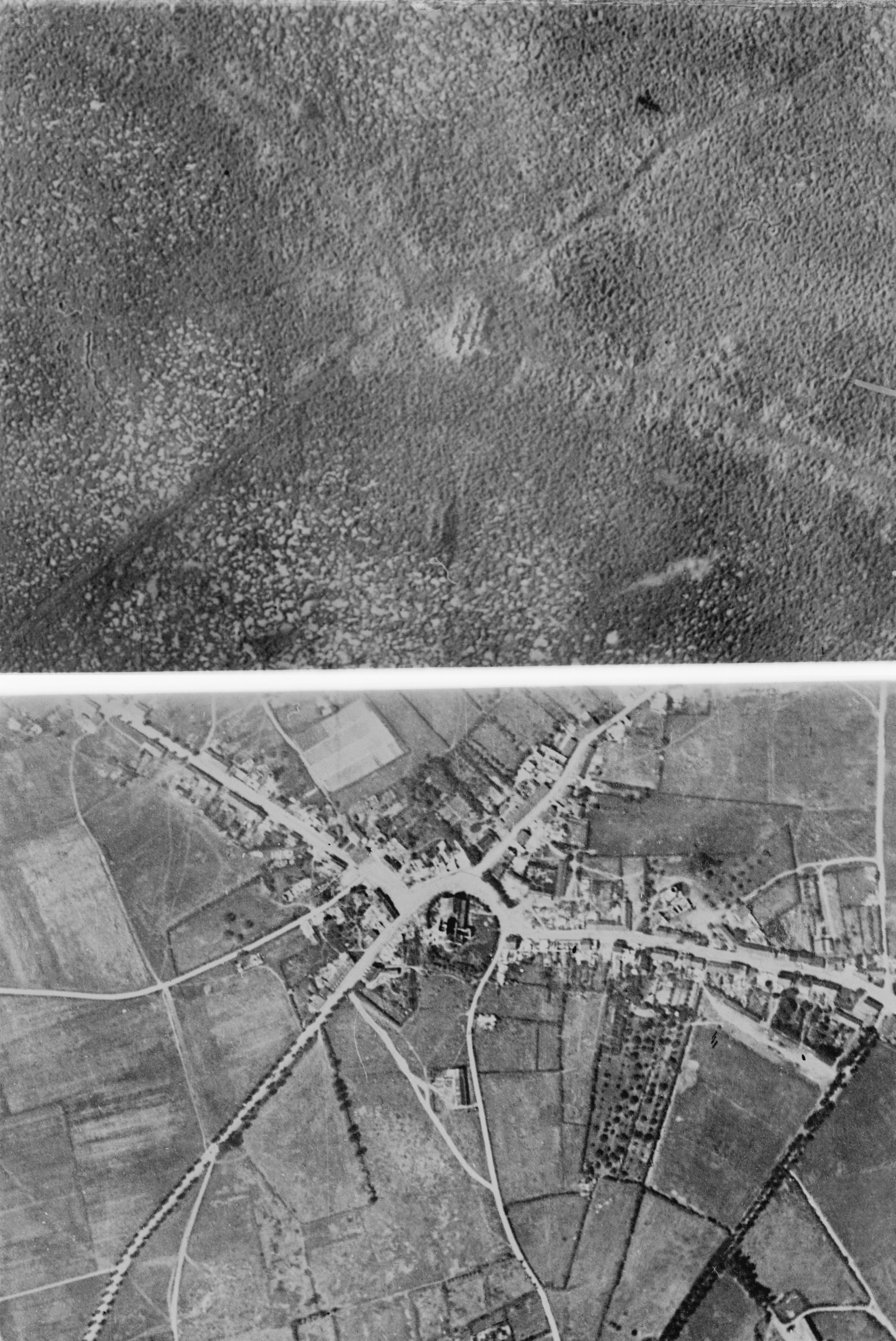
- Aerial views of Passchendaele before and after the Third Battle of Ypres
Date	1/2 December 1917
Location	Passchendaele, Belgium 50°54′N 03°01′E
Result	German victory

Belligerents
United Kingdom	German Empire

Commanders and leaders
Douglas Haig	Crown Prince Rupprecht

Units involved
Fourth Army	4th Army

Strength
9 battalions	4 regiments

Casualties and losses
1,689	c. 800
- Passchendaele (Passendale), a village in the Belgian province of West Flanders

The Night action of 1/2 December 1917 during the First World War, was a local operation on the Western Front, in Belgium at the Ypres Salient. The action was a British Fourth Army (re-named from the Second Army on 8 November) attack on the German 4th Army. The Third Battle of Ypres (31 July – 10 November) proper had ended officially on 20 November but the attack was intended to capture the heads of valleys leading eastwards from the ridge, to gain observation over German positions.

On 18 November the VIII Corps on the right and II Corps on the left (northern) side of the Passchendaele Salient, took over from the Canadian Corps. The area was subjected to constant German artillery bombardment and its vulnerability to attack led to a suggestion by Brigadier Cecil Aspinall that the British should either retire to the west side of the Gheluvelt Plateau or advance to broaden the salient towards Westroosebeke (now Westrozebeke). Expanding the salient would make the troops in it less vulnerable to German artillery-fire and provide a better jumping off line for a resumption of the offensive in the spring of 1918.

The British attacked towards Westroozebeke on the night of 1/2 December, dispensing with a preliminary bombardment as a ruse, the artillery remaining silent until eight minutes after the infantry advanced. The ploy failed because the noise of the British assembly and the difficulty of moving across muddy and waterlogged ground had alerted the Germans. In the moonlight, the British troops were visible when they were still 200 yd (180 m) short of the German defences. Some ground was captured and about 150 prisoners were taken but the attack on the redoubts failed and observation over the heads of the valleys on the east and north sides of the ridge, was not gained.

== Background ==
=== Strategic developments ===
With the failure to capture Passchendaele and the ridge on 12 October, the grand strategic objectives of the Third Battle of Ypres were abandoned. Attacks continued, to secure a winter line from Passchendaele to Westroosebeke to hold German troops in Flanders before a British offensive at Cambrai due on 20 November and to provide jumping-off points for a resumption of the offensive in 1918. On 20 November 1917, Field Marshal Sir Douglas Haig, commander of the British Expeditionary Force (BEF) formally ended the offensive. Haig took the decision because of an acute shortage of infantry, orders to send five divisions to Italy in the British Expeditionary Force (Italy) and the need to take over more of the Western Front from the French. Command of the former Second Army sector in Flanders was transferred to General Henry Rawlinson and the Fourth Army HQ, which also took over command of II Corps (Lieutenant-General Claud Jacob). General Hubert Gough and the Fifth Army headquarters were transferred to Artois, in command of the divisions relieving French army south of the Somme. It was desirable for the Fourth Army to mount minor operations to improve its positions and to continue to keep German troops away from Cambrai, once the Battle of Cambrai (20 November – 7 December 1917) had begun.

=== Tactical developments ===
==== Fifth Army ====
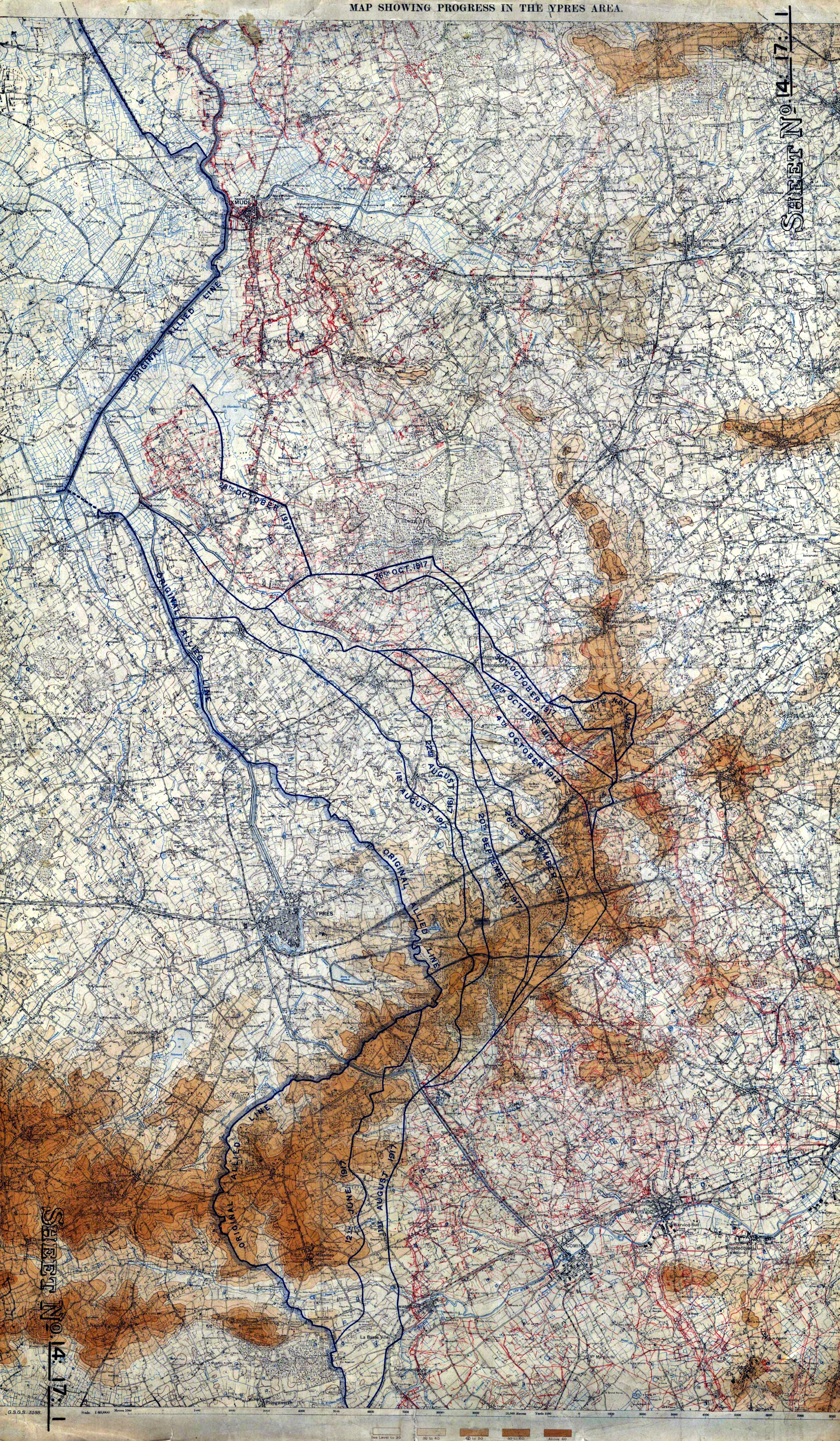
Map Showing Allied progress in the Ypres Salient, 1917

After the Battle of the Menin Road Ridge on 20 September, British attack planning had reached a stage of development where plans had been reduced to a formula. The Second Army operation order of 7 November was written on less than a sheet of paper. Corps staffs produced more detailed plans, particularly for the artillery and more discretion was allowed to divisional commanders than in 1915 and 1916. The tactical sophistication of the infantry had increased during the battle but the chronic difficulty of communicating between front and rear during an attack, could only partially be remedied.

Practical forms of communication relied on sight, which was dependent on the weather and the time of day. Due to the German system of pillbox defence and the impossibility of maintaining line formations on ground full of flooded shell-craters, waves of infantry had been replaced by a thin line of skirmishers leading small columns, that snaked around shell-holes and mud sloughs. The rifle was re-established as the primary infantry weapon and Stokes mortars were added to creeping barrages; "draw net" barrages were introduced, where field guns began a barrage 1,500 yd (1,400 m) beyond the German front line and then moved it towards the German positions several times before an attack.

==== 4th Army ====
German counter-attacks, from the Battle of the Menin Road Ridge on 20 September to the end of the Flanders campaign, had become "assaults on reinforced field positions", due to the British infantry making shorter advances, after torrential rains in August had turned much of the ground into a swamp. The difficulty the British had in co-ordinating infantry advances, artillery-fire, tank and aircraft operations in such weather, left the infantry vulnerable to the German defensive tactic of Gegenstoß (immediate counter-attack). A dry spell in September greatly increased the effectiveness of British air observation and artillery-fire and from 20 September, German Gegenstöße had been smashed by dug-in British infantry, often on reverse slopes and in contact with their artillery. On 9 October, the 4th Army ordered the dispersal of the battalions of front line regiments again and moved reserve battalions back behind the artillery protective line. Eingreif divisions were moved closer to the front line, quickly to counter-attack and counter-battery fire was increased to protect the Eingreif divisions from the British artillery.

Behind a Vorfeldlinie (outpost line) an outpost zone 500–1,000 yd (460–910 m) deep, was occupied by a few sentries and machine-guns. When the British attacked, the troops in the Vorfeldlinie and the outpost zone were swiftly to retire to the main line of resistance (Hauptwiederstandslinie) and the artillery was quickly to bombard the Vorfeldlinie. The rear battalions of the ground-holding divisions (Stellungsdivisionen) and their Eingreif division would advance to the Hauptwiederstandslinie and conduct a Gegenstoß (improvised counter-attack) if this was impossible, a Gegenangriff (methodical counter-attack) would be substituted, after taking 24–48 hours to arrange the co-ordination of infantry, artillery and aircraft. The length of front held by a Stellungsdivision was reduced by half to 2,500 yd (2,300 m) with a depth of 8,000 yd (4.5 mi; 7.3 km), because of the difficulties caused by the weather, devastating British artillery-fire and German infantry casualties. Infantry battalions were relieved after two days and the divisions every six days. The Vorfeldzonelinie concept was soon altered because the British were able to pick off isolated outposts and lift prisoners. A Sicherungslinie (safety line), to be retired to at night, was built to stop the British raiding the Vorfeldzonelinie. The Hauptwiderstandslinie was about 400 yd (370 m) further back, comprising fortified farms, pillboxes, blockhouses and shell craters. (The Vorfeldzone around Passchendaele was captured by the Canadian Corps on 10 November and the Hauptwiderstandslinie perforce became a linear defence, protecting the eastern slope of Passchendaele Ridge.)

=== Second Battle of Passchendaele ===
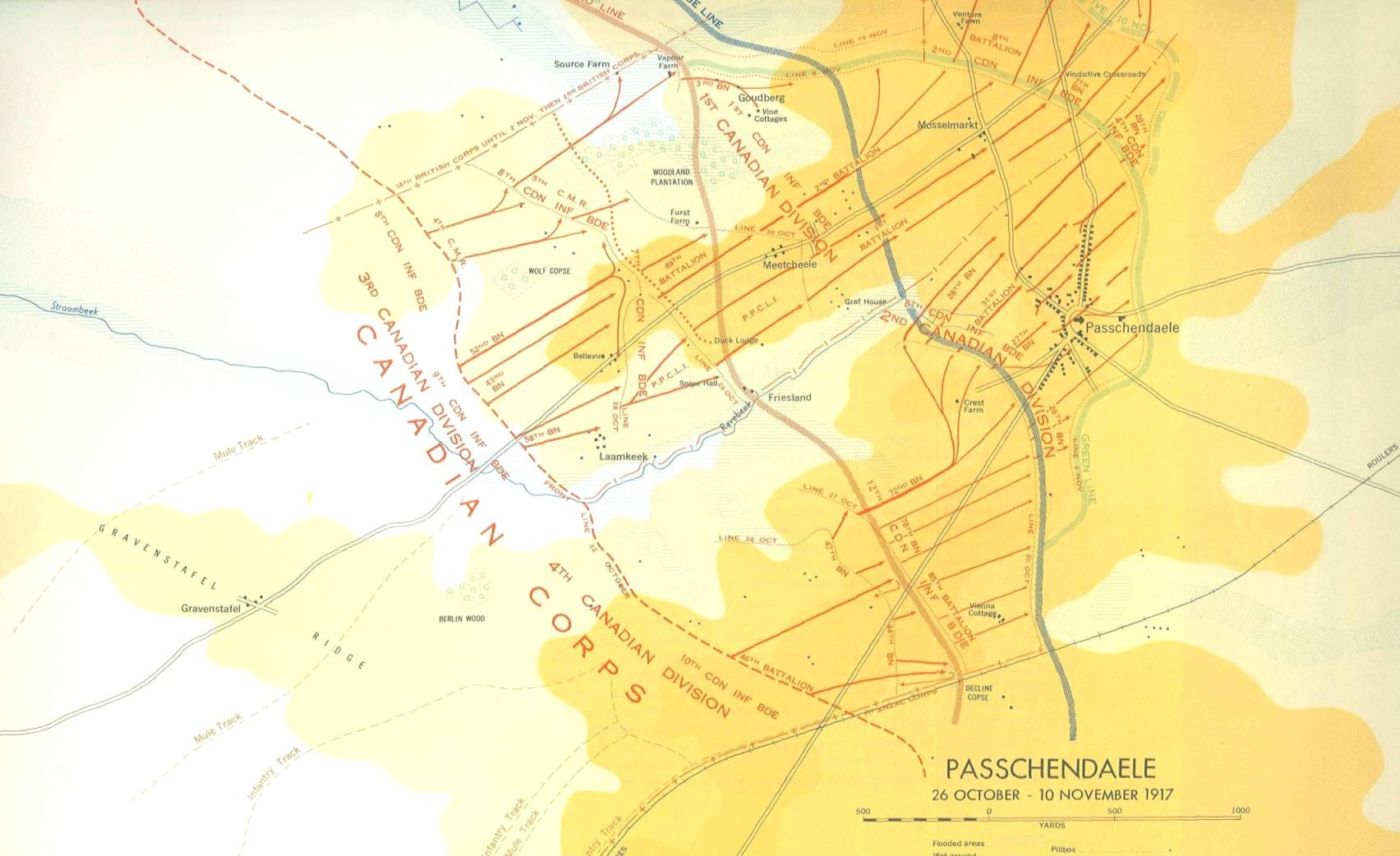
Second Battle of Passchendaele map (26 October – 10 November 1917

After the Canadian Corps attacks in late October and the capture of Passchendaele village on 6 November, the Canadians attacked the crossroads and remaining high ground near Hill 52 to the north on 10 November. The junction was 1,000 yd (910 m) north on the Passchendaele–Westroosebeke road and Hill 52 was 500 yd (460 m) beyond. Capture of the features would give the Second Army observation over German positions to the north-east. The Germans had used the lull after 6 November relieve the 11th Division with the 4th Division and the 44th Reserve Division.

The Canadian infantry jumped-off from Mosselmarkt and captured the crossroads and Venture Farm. In the II Corps area to the north, the advance by the 1st Division was foiled, when one of its two attacking battalions lost direction; a German counter-attack got between them and forced the survivors back to their start lines. Canadian troops filled the gap and formed a defensive flank along the corps boundary but this ended the Canadian advance. The Second Army was still short of Westrosebeek, from which the Germans had observation over the Passchendaele Salient. In the Fifth Army area, the XIV Corps had been relieved by XIX Corps on 29 October, II Corps took over from XVIII Corps on 2 November and on 14 November, VIII Corps in the Second Army area began the relief of the Canadian Corps.

=== Weather ===
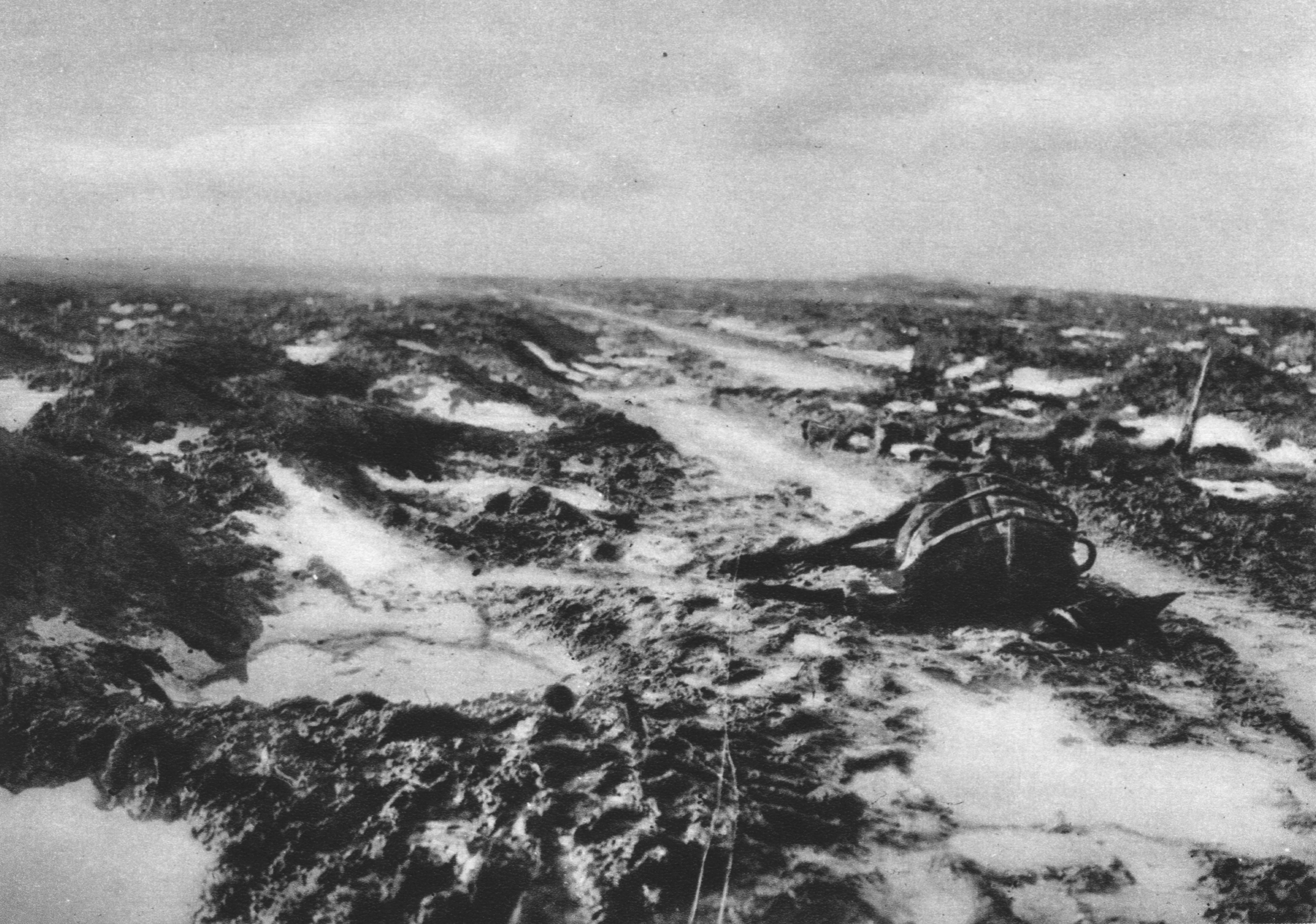
Gelände bei Passchendale (Terrain at Passchendaele)

In August 1917, rainwater had dried relatively quickly; swamping had been caused by the unusually large rainfall and still air. When the autumn rains began in October, intermittent sunny spells were insufficient to dry the ground. (Note: In 1935, the chief engineers of the armies, corps and divisions reported that contact with the front line had become much more difficult in early October; the French First Army had the same difficulty on the northern flank.) Carrying parties were needed to move supplies to the front line and conditions for the artillery became so bad that pack mules were used to carry ammunition. Heavy guns had to be strung out in lines along plank roads, which made them easily visible from German positions. Haig was kept informed of conditions and the amount of sickness among the troops in Flanders but judged that conditions for German troops were even worse. The strategic objectives of the British offensive were abandoned in early October and Haig ordered that, once the weather had improved, Passchendaele Ridge was to be captured as a winter position. On 21 October, the 4th Army reported that its troops were close to collapse, because of the constant British artillery-fire, exposure to the weather in mud-filled shell-holes and with no time to recover because of the tempo of British attacks.

=== Passchendaele salient ===
Weather 1 November – 6 December 1917 (Note: After 11 November, data for the BEF area in France.)
Date	Rain mm	°F	
1	0.2	51	dull
2	0.7	56	dull
3	0.0	52	dull
4	0.0	47	dull
5	0.0	49	fog
6	1.0	52	dull
7	1.4	48	dull
8	2.6	44	cloud
9	1.6	50	cloud
10	13.4	46	—
11	1.8	48	—
12	—	—	fine
13	—	—	fine
14	—	—	rain
15	—	—	fine
16	—	—	dull
17	—	—	dull

The British salient was about 3,000 yd (1.7 mi; 2.7 km) deep, 1,000 yd (910 m) wide and was overlooked from German positions at Westroosebeke to the north, the highest point on Passchendaele Ridge. The Ravebeek stream, flowing from the church ruins in Passchendaele to Zonnebeke had overflowed and become another swamp of decomposing flesh and detritus. Troops had to struggle through miles of barbed wire, tree stumps, a swamp of rotting corpses, shell craters full of bodies and broken equipment. The ground was glutinous and also slippery; when trodden on, gas fumes rose to mix with the stench of the dead. The mud held men's boots so tight that they had to be pulled free and if a soldier tried to detour, he could disappear in the mud or blunder into German positions.

There was one duckboard track into the salient, easily visible to German observers and under frequent shell and gas bombardments. Roads from Broodseinde and Zonnebeke were also constantly fired on. When the 33rd Division took over from the 3rd Canadian Division on 6 November, the only places proof against German shells were captured pillboxes and blockhouses. The locations of these structures were obvious to the Germans, who continuously bombarded them with gas shell, making them near uninhabitable.

Once the British plan to continue the advance to Westroosebeke had been cancelled, the salient was fortified against a possible German attack and troops were crammed into it. To provide shelter, the VIII Corps HQ had two shafts dug with galleries at the bottom big enough for two companies in each. Primus shaft was dug on the Keerselaarhoek rise next to the Passchendaele road and the other shaft was excavated at Crest Farm, the assembly area for troops who were to be ready to counter a German attack. The shelters needed continuous pumping but still had about a foot of water in them and were overrun by rats. Engineers and pioneers managed to double the duckboard track and as troops were relieved they were formed into working parties to complete the "mule track", about 1.9 mi (3 km) long, from Frost House to Tyne Cottages (Tyne Cot).

When the new track was finished, wagon drivers and mule attendants ran the gauntlet of German artillery to deliver supplies, sometimes adding to the corpses on either side. A Decauville track (light railway) was built and provided a near-regular service with six to eight wagons, which moved so quietly that the drivers avoided most of the German shelling. British and Dominion mining companies built many more concrete, gas-proof dug outs but the Germans added a nose irritant to the normal phosgene gas, which was indistinguishable; sometimes the irritant induced soldiers to remove the mask, unaware that they were breathing phosgene as well. Sometimes, having walked back from Passchendaele, a soldier would drop dead at the canteen in Ypres town square.

== Prelude ==
=== German preparations ===
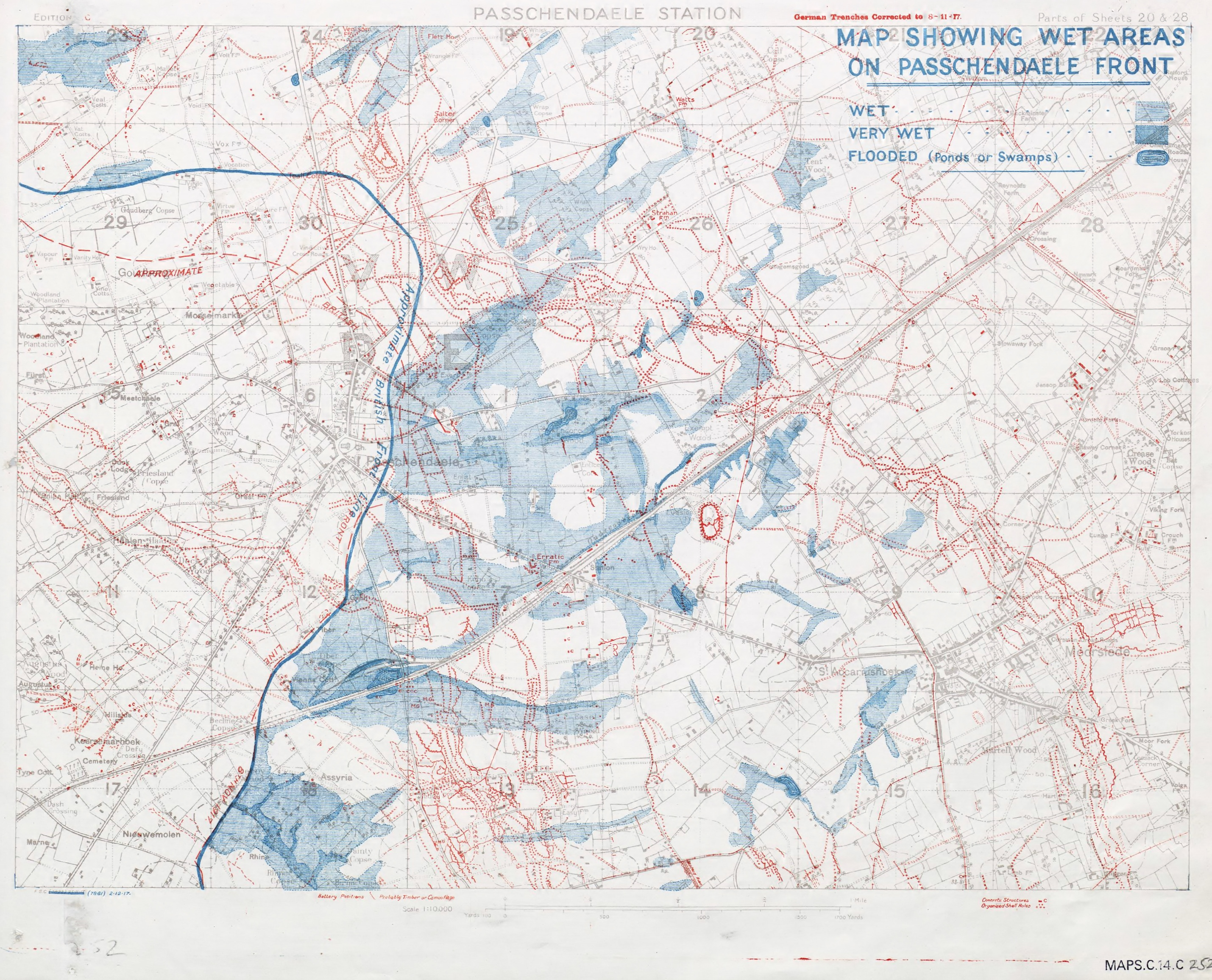
Map showing waterlogged areas around Passchendaele in November 1917

After the First Battle of Passchendaele on 12 October, a new corps headquarters, Gruppe Staden took over the divisions between Gruppe Ypern to the south and Gruppe Dicksmuide further north, with its southern boundary from Vindictive Crossroads north-eastwards to Oostnieuwkerke, west of Westroosebeke. After the British attack on 10 November, both sides kept up continuous bombardments and night bombing by aircraft; the British flyers even attacked front line positions on moonlit nights. From November, the neighbouring divisions of Gruppe Staden and Gruppe Ypern held the area from Passchendaele village to a rise topped by Vat Cottage. (Note: Gruppen (Groups) had superseded corps with permanently attached divisions, corps headquarters were given a territorial name and organised and supplied divisions sent to the area; by remaining in one place the Gruppe staff officers gained the benefit of continuity.)

The Gruppe Staden division occupied two positions known to the British as Southern Redoubt and Northern Redoubt, linked by Venison Trench, which was about 550 yd (500 m) long. From 11 November, the 199th Reserve Division held the Gruppe Staden area until relieved the night of 16/17 November by the 4th Division, returning on the night of 21/22 November until the night of 30 November/1 December. In the Gruppe Ypern area, the 44th Reserve Division was in the line until 14 November and was relieved by the 25th Division until 20 November, then the division had another spell until 26 November, when the 25th Division took over again.

Sector B (Abschnitt B) of the neighbouring Gruppe Staden division, lay on drier ground to the west of the Northern Redoubt; east of the Passchendaele–Westroosebeke road, the occupants of a pillbox (Teall Cottage to the British) had a commanding view over the ground to the north of Venison Trench; beyond this were the outworks of Westroosebeke. The topography of the area enabled the Germans to avoid obvious entrenchments and hold the front with shell-crater positions and fortified localities. Höhenrücken (High Ridge, Hill 52 to the British) was about 200 yd (180 m) west of Teall Cottage, higher than the rest of the vicinity and was the main defensive work of Abschnitt B, with observation of the British lines north of Vindictive Crossroads. Farmhouses known to the British as Volt, Void, Vocation, Virile and Vox farms, Veal and Vat cottages, had been fortified and pillboxes built between them.

In November, the German commanders became cautiously optimistic that the Flandernschlacht (Flanders Offensive) was over, although the British artillery still caused many casualties. On 20 November, the HQ of Gruppe Wijtschate issued a memo to all commanders, complaining that the lack of saluting by junior officers was setting a bad example to the men. To foster offensive spirit, many patrols were conducted and on one occasion, troops of Infantry Regiment 116 reached Passchendaele church. On 26 November, when the 25th Division relieved the 44th Reserve Division to the north and east of Passchendaele, the men found that the conditions were even worse, the weather being much colder. In early December, there was little shelter and most of the infantry had to exist in the open, with no protection from the elements. A great effort was made to supply "Siegfried Shelters" for four to six men, made from eight to ten sheets of corrugated iron over steel pillars, the sheets bent into an arc and bolted to a wooden floor. In the front line, shelters were buried under a metre of earth, close to the remains of hedgerows, buildings and bushes, which was found to be excellent camouflage against British reconnaissance aircraft.

=== British preparations ===
Weather 18–30 November 1917 (Note: After 11 November, all data for the BEF area in France.)
Date
18	dull
19	dull
20	dull
21	rain
22	rain
23	rain
24	rain
25	rain
26	snow
27	rain
28	fine
29	fine
30	fine

By 18 November, II Corps held the northern part of the salient and VIII Corps held the south side. Brigadier-General Cecil Aspinall (later Aspinall-Oglander), the Brigadier-General General Staff (BGGS) of VIII Corps wrote a report describing the vulnerability of the position and its approaches to German artillery. Aspinall estimated that repairing the transport routes and keeping them open, despite German bombardments, would take eight labour battalions, when VIII Corps had only three. Aspinall considered that the morale effect of holding the village after such an effort by both sides was considerable, that parts of the rear area were shielded from German observers and it would be a good jumping-off position for an offensive towards Westroosebeke or the Lys valley but that its positions lacked observation to the north and north-east.

Remaining in the salient would mean that the Germans could bombard the defenders from an arc of 240° (degrees), reinforcements had no cover and supplies had to be carried forward a great distance. It would be easy for the Germans to prevent troops moving into the salient and they could smother the area with artillery-fire, guaranteeing a constant drain of casualties. Because the salient needed an excessive amount of artillery, the crews would have little rest, being so vulnerable to flanking-fire and the infantry holding the area would be too worn out to fight in a spring offensive. Aspinall recommended that unless there was another offensive in early 1918, the British should withdraw about 8,000 yd (4.5 mi; 7.3 km), to a line from Westhoek, along Pilckem Ridge to the north. A retirement should not be delayed until a German attack, because much of the artillery would be lost but rather be by surprise, as soon as the new front line was ready.

Despite the gloomy prognosis, Rawlinson decided that the army should remain on the ridge. Teall Cottage was captured on the night of 21/22 November and on the night of 24/25 November, two battalions of the 8th Division attacked without artillery support and advanced the line to the ridge crest, which increased the depth of observation into the German lines by 400 yd (370 m). An expected German counter-attack on the 8th Division front at 6:00 a.m. on 30 November was a costly failure, many German casualties being inflicted by British small-arms fire and a prompt artillery barrage. Teall Cottage, having been transferred from the 8th Division to the 32nd Division area on 24/25 November, was recaptured and a British counter-attack on the cottage before dawn on 1 December failed, with 102 casualties.

=== British plan ===
Map showing the 8th Division's preparations, dated 28 November 1917

VIII Corps held the right flank of the salient with the 33rd Division on the right and the 8th Division in the centre; II Corps held the left flank with the 32nd Division. At a conference on 18 November, Rawlinson told Jacob, Hunter-Weston and Lieutenant-General Arthur Currie (Canadian Corps) that an operation to take the ground along the ridge as far as Westroosebeke was to be undertaken to broaden the salient. Success would give the British observation over valleys on the north and east sides of the ridge and deprive the Germans of assembly areas on the reverse slope.

Planning began for a methodical advance to broaden the salient from Passchendaele to Westroosebeke and Spriet. The 8th Division (Major-General William Heneker) was to conduct an attack on 26 November, to advance 100–300 yd (91–274 m) eastwards on a 1,020 yd (930 m) front and the 32nd Division (Major General Cameron Shute) was to act as a flank guard on the north edge of the salient, by advancing for 400 yd (370 m) on the flanks and 700 yd (640 m) in the centre, on a 1,850 yd (1,690 m) front. The 35th Division to the north was to support the 32nd Division with machine-gun fire.

== Night attack ==
=== 8th Division ===
As the attacking battalions of the 25th Brigade moved forward to their jumping-off points in the bright moonlight, German machine-gunners spotted the troops on the left flank and opened fire; after three minutes, they began to fire on the British in the centre and on the left, who had been hidden by cloud. After H-hour + five minutes, the British troops were engaged by small-arms fire all along the front and the German infantry sent up flares and rockets. The British artillery began to fire at H-hour + eight minutes as planned; the German artillery took a minute longer. The delay caused by the German infantry small-arms fire, prevented some of the British support troops from getting clear before the German barrage came down; many casualties were suffered and B Company HQ of the 2nd Battalion Royal Berkshire Regiment (2nd Berks) was hit.

The 8th Division attack on Passchendaele ridge, 1/2 December 1917.

The battalion reached its objectives and D Company dug in up to the south-eastern end of Southern Redoubt. C Company on the right, which was to form a defensive flank, had far less trouble and the platoon adjacent to D Company took 30 prisoners; 5 Platoon, B Company, managed to get into Southern Redoubt and began a mutually-costly hand-to-hand struggle with the garrison. The troops on the left of B Company veered left to gain touch with the 2nd Battalion Lincolnshire Regiment (2nd Lincoln) which had not been able to maintain its advance, went too far and opened a gap to the north of Southern Redoubt, which isolated 5 Platoon in the redoubt. The survivors of the platoon were forced out and dug in facing south-west but this uncovered the left flank of D Company, which then had to repulse several small counter-attacks.

The left flank platoons of B Company had got into the trench between the redoubts, killed many Germans and captured three machine-guns; both flanks were open but the troops held on. The British position was in front of the 2nd Lincoln, which had been caught by small-arms fire at the start of the attack and only managed to get within 30 yd (27 m) of the German front line, where the survivors dug in. On the left flank, the 2nd Battalion, The Rifle Brigade (2nd RB) was also caught by machine-gun fire from the front and by enfilade fire from Teal Cottage in the 32nd Division area. The cottage should have been captured earlier by the 32nd Division and the left end of the 2nd RB forming up tape ran from the position. Just before the advance, it was discovered that the Germans were still there and the 2nd RB hastily masked it with a defensive flank. The battalion failed to reach Venison Trench, suffering so many casualties that it had to dig in only about 100 yd (91 m) in front of the original front line.

The 8th Division battalions held their ground against small counter-attacks until about 4:10 p.m., when German artillery-fire increased in volume and the 32nd Division sent up SOS flares, which were repeated by the 8th Division. The British artillery replied instantly and German troops in the open, east of Southern Redoubt were caught by the bombardment and repulsed. By 5:00 a.m. the German artillery had fallen silent and a lull fell over the 8th Division front. The troops in front of the 2nd Lincoln were brought back and filled the gap between the 2nd Lincoln and the 2nd Berks, which created a continuous line; the 25th Brigade was relieved by the 41st Brigade of the 14th (Light) Division overnight.

=== 32nd Division ===
Weather 1–6 December 1917 (Note: After 11 November, all data for the BEF area in France.)
Date	Rain mm	°F	
1	—	—	fine
2	—	—	cold
3	—	—	fine
4	—	—	cold
5	—	—	fine
6	—	—	dull

The 97th Brigade and the 15th Battalion, Lancashire Fusiliers (15th LF) of the 96th Brigade formed up below the faint outline of Hill 52 and the low southern slope of Vat Cottage Ridge. The 2nd Battalion, King's Own Yorkshire Light Infantry (2nd KOYLI) was on the right flank, with three companies for the attack and one in support, the 16th Battalion, Highland Light Infantry to its left, then the 11th Battalion, Border Regiment (11th Border) and 17th Battalion, Highland Light Infantry (17th HLI), each with two companies leading and two in support. The 15th LF on the left flank, had been holding the line with the 16th Battalion, Northumberland Fusiliers (16th NF) since the night of 30 November/1 December.

The 15th LF had three assault companies and one in support on a 1,850 yd (1,690 m) front, from Teall Cottage to the north-east of Tournant Farm. After being relieved, the 16th NF retired to the right of Virile Farm in reserve; patrols and Lewis gun crews entered no man's land after dark to cover the assembly. The battalions formed four waves, the first two in skirmish lines forming an advanced guard and the other two in section columns (snake formation), to advance through the crater field and be ready to outflank the objectives.

Advancing at 1:55 a.m., the 97th Brigade suffered many casualties amongst junior officers and NCOs; after seizing Hill 52 and Mallet Copse, the advance was stopped by resolute German defenders. Counter-attacks during the morning and late afternoon drove back the tired survivors to positions just short of or on the jumping-off line. Shute requested permission to attack again with the 14th Brigade (Brigadier-General Frederick William Lumsden) but was refused by British GHQ on the morning of 3 December.

== Aftermath ==
=== Analysis ===
In 2011, Michael LoCicero wrote that the Action on the Polderhoek Spur (3 December) by two New Zealand battalions, had received more attention than the nine-battalion attack on Passchendaele Ridge and it had received only a cursory mention in the Reichsarchiv publication Flandern 1917 (1928) by Werner Beumelburg. In 1926, the 8th Division historians, John Boraston and Cyril Bax wrote that the attack was a limited success at best. Some ground had been captured and about 150 prisoners taken but the redoubts had not been captured and the Germans had held the ground giving observation over the heads of the valleys on the east and north sides of the ridge. The noise that the British infantry made as they assembled and the difficulty of moving over muddy and waterlogged ground, alerted the Germans. In the moonlight, the Germans could see the British troops when they were still 200 yd (180 m) away; without artillery covering fire for the first eight minutes, the attack was doomed. Beumelburg wrote that on 2 December, two British brigades (sic) attacked on a narrow front against the 38th Division of Gruppe Staden and the 25th Division and 12th Reserve Division of Gruppe Ypern; after an initial advance the British were repulsed. On 3 December, a British attack on a 1,300 ft (400 m) front against the left flank of the 17th Reserve Division had also been defeated.

In his 1979 memoir The Anger of the Guns, John Nettleton, the former Intelligence Officer for the 2nd Battalion, Rifle Brigade (Prince Consort's Own), wrote that in conditions where the moon was near full, there was no cover and the troops would stumble forward, rather than overrun the German defences. Objections to the plan were passed on by the 8th Division battalion, brigade and division commanders

...hostile machine-gun fire from prepared positions on a bright moonlight night was more to be feared than any barrage.

— Heneker

Heneker was over-ruled. Everything went wrong from the start; everyone thought that the attack would fail and morale plummeted. It appeared that the Germans realised that an attack was imminent the night before, when the Royal Engineers went forward to mark the jumping-off lines for the attack. There was only one decent road for the 32nd Division and a duckboard track for the 25th Brigade of the 8th Division to reach the assembly positions. German artillery was registered on these approach routes and inflicted many casualties as the troops moved up. The track was on the right side of the 8th Division and the troops using it had to move from right to left to assemble along the tapes. The moon was bright and the Germans could not but notice three battalions lining up behind the British outpost line.

As liaison officer to the 32nd Division, Nettleton moved up along the road and wrote that if the Germans were still ignorant of British intentions, a soldier carrying a sack of very lights was hit by a bullet which set them off. The troops nearby rolled him in the mud but could not extinguish the flares. The 32nd Division was supposed to have captured the Teall Cottage pillbox two days previous but the troops found that it was still occupied by Germans. The cottage was at a right angle in the front line and the attacking lines of both divisions could be enfiladed by machine-gun fires from the pillbox. The 32nd Division companies assembled in echelon to the left of Teall Cottage; runners from the Royal Irish Rifles drank the run ration and the battalion commander had to cadge replacements from the 25th Brigade. From the battalion HQ, Nettleton heard the German machine-guns begin to fire at 1:55 a.m. as soon the advance began. The artillery barrage that began eight minutes later was "magnificent" but the attack had already been defeated, the German machine-gunners having "wiped out" the British infantry in the moonlight. The 2nd KOYLI managed to advance only 100 yd (91 m) and when it was relieved on the night of 2/3 December, it had the appearance of an understrength company.

LoCicero wrote that the night attack 1/2 December was an obscure postscript to the Third Battle of Ypres, which had been only alluded to in Haig's dispatch for 1917. (Note: A Moonlight Massacre: The Night Operation on the Passchendaele Ridge, 2 December 1917: The Forgotten Last Act of the Third Battle of Ypres based on the thesis, was published in 2014.) Reginald Bond had written in a volume of the History of the King's Own Yorkshire Light Infantry (1929) that the only big night attack of the campaign had been overlooked because of the Battle of Cambrai. The operation was only briefly mentioned in the Report of the Battles Nomenclature Committee (1922) and not at all in the 1948 official history volume by James Edmonds. Edmonds and Shute corresponded about attack in 1930 but it did not appear in the official history. In 1938, I. S. O. Playfair had also failed to persuade the official historians to include the capture of Infantry Hill on 14 June 1917, which he called a notable success. In See How They Ran: The British Retreat of 1918 (1970), William Moore wrote that the casualties of the attack were not counted in the official history; Michael Stedman referred to a "futile sideshow" in Salford Pals: A History of the Salford Brigade (1993).

=== Casualties ===
The Eighth Division historians, John Boraston and Cyril Bax, recorded 624 casualties, Moore wrote that the 8th Division suffered 2,630 casualties. The 32nd Division losses were about the same and that the casualty statistics in Military Operations, France and Belgium 1917, Part II omitted those of 1/2 December. In 2011, LoCicero calculated that the 8th Division suffered losses from 2 to 3 December of about 552 men, the 32nd Division suffered 1,137 casualties and infantry regiments 117, 94, 116 and 95 suffered about 800 casualties. In The Passchendaele Campaign 1917 (2017) Andrew Rawson wrote that the attack had cost the British over 1,600 casualties.

=== Subsequent operations ===
==== Winter 1917–1918 ====
The 33rd Division was relieved by the 50th Division on 13 December and the area to the east and south of Passchendaele was held by posts, those to the east being fairly habitable, unlike the southern ones; from Passchendaele as far back as Potijze, the ground was far worse. Each brigade spent four days in the front line, four in support and four in reserve; on 18 December, thirteen Germans with four machine-guns were captured, having got lost in no man's land. The area was quiet apart from artillery-fire and the 50th Division was relieved by the 33rd Division from 4–6 January 1918, then came back into the line from 29 January. From 25–27 December, the 8th Division relieved of the 14th (Light) Division in cold and snowy weather, which entailed a great effort to prevent trench foot. In January, spells of freezing cold were followed by warmer periods, one beginning on 15 January with torrential rain and gale force winds, washing away plank roads and duckboard tracks. Conditions in the salient improved with the completion of transport routes and the refurbishment of German pillboxes. The Germans continued to raiding the British lines, often from a position known as the gasometers and also from Passchendaele railway station. The British retaliated and used night machine-gun fire and artillery barrages to great effect.

In places the German front line was pushed back until parts of no man's land were 700–1,000 yd (640–910 m) wide and the Germans abandoned the gasometers. On 9 February, the 33rd Division handed over part of the line to the 29th Division and took over ground from the 66th Division. The 29th Division had returned from Cambrai in late November and relieved the 8th Division on the night of 18/19 January. The division worked on the defences until relieved by the 8th Division from 9 to 12 February and returned to the salient on 7 March. On the evening of 3 March, two companies of the 8th Division raided Teal Cottage, supported by a smoke and shrapnel barrage, killed many of the garrison and took six prisoners, for one man wounded. A German attack on the 29th Division by two battalions on 11 March was repulsed; after that the Germans made no more attacks, keeping up frequent artillery bombardments and machine-gun fire instead. When the German armies further south began the Spring Offensive on 21 March 1918, "good" divisions in Flanders were sent south; the 29th Division was withdrawn on 9 April and transferred to the Lys.

==== Retreat, 1918 ====
On 23 March, due to a shortage of British reserves and the need to reinforce the Fifth and Third armies during the German Spring Offensive, Haig ordered Plumer to make contingency plans to shorten the line and release troops for the other armies. Worn-out divisions from Artois had been sent to Flanders to recuperate closer to the coast. On 11 April, Plumer authorised a withdrawal of the southern flank of the Second Army and ordered the VIII and II corps in the Passchendaele Salient to retreat the next day into the Battle Zone, leaving outposts left in the Forward Zone of the British defence system. The divisional commanders were ordered that the Forward Zone must be held and that the Germans must not be given the impression that a withdrawal was in progress. At noon on 12 April, the VIII Corps HQ ordered the infantry retirement to begin that night and the 59th Division was replaced by part of the 41st Division and transferred south. II Corps had begun to withdraw its artillery at the same time as VIII Corps on the night of 11/12 April and ordered the 36th (Ulster) Division and the 30th Division to conform to the VIII Corps retirement. The move was completed by 13 April without German interference; VIII Corps HQ was transferred into reserve.

During 13 April, General Headquarters (GHQ) discussed the situation in the Lys valley, where the German advance had lengthened the British front line. Plumer agreed to a retirement on the south side of the Ypres Salient to a reserve line from Mt Kemmel to Voormezeele (1.6 mi (2.5 km) south of Ypres), White Château (0.62 mi (1 km) east of Ypres) and Pilckem Ridge but ordered only that artillery ammunition be carried to the rear (a 4th Army report on 14 April had the British still in the Passchendaele Salient). The next day was quiet and the withdrawal of the II Corps and XXII Corps divisions was covered by the outposts in the original front line. Artillery had been divided into active batteries which fired and a greater number kept silent and camouflaged, with orders not to fire except in an emergency. (Note: The XXII Corps and II Corps divisions were the 30th, 36th, 41st, 6th and brigades of the 49th Division and 21st Division.) Plumer ordered the retirement to begin by occupying the new line before the night of 15/16 April, the garrisons in the outpost line and the Battle Zone remaining, with a few troops in an intermediate line beyond it. On the night of 15/16 April, the outpost line garrisons were to withdraw behind the new front line at 4:00 a.m. The intermediate line in front of the Battle Zone was to be held as long as possible to help the troops in the new line get ready for a German attack.

On 16 April, patrols went forward during the morning and found the area between the old and new front lines empty, the Germans still apparently ignorant of the retirement; a patrol captured a German officer scouting for observation posts, who did not know where the British were. Only in the late afternoon did German troops begin to close up to the new line and the troops in the Battle Zone easily repulsed the German infantry; the 4th Army diary recorded that patrols discovered the withdrawal at 4;40 a.m. On 17 April, at the Battle of Merckem, the Germans attacked north-east of Ypres, from Houthulst Forest, between Langemarck and Lake Blankaart to the north, with the 58th, 2nd Naval and the 6th Bavarian divisions against the 10th and 3rd Belgian divisions. The German troops captured Kippe, were forced out by Belgian counter-attacks supported by the II Corps artillery and the line was restored by nightfall. On the afternoon of 27 April, the south end of the Second Army outpost line was driven in, when Voormezeele was captured, re-captured and then partly captured by the Germans; another British outpost line was established north-east of the village.
