= Palmer-Moore Company =

Defunct American motor vehicle manufacturer

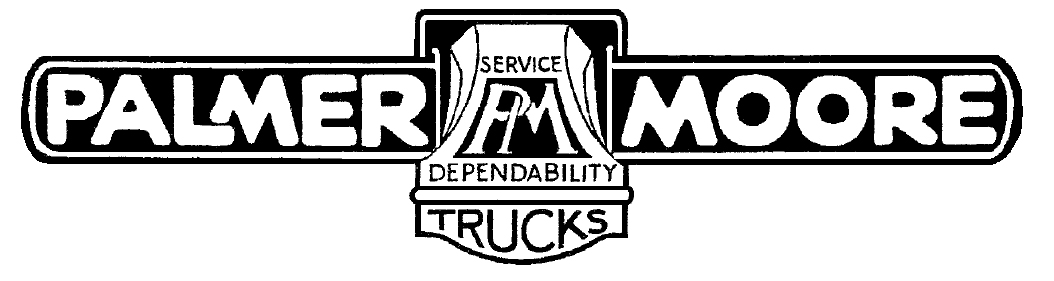
- Company type: Truck Manufacturing
- Industry: Engine and truck manufacturing
- Genre: Trucks
- Founded: 1906
- Founder: Charles L. Palmer, Thomas W. Meachem, T. G. Meachem and Edward Moore
- Defunct: 1918
- Fate: Competition and lack of capital during World War I
- Headquarters: Syracuse, New York, United States
- Area served: United States
- Key people: Thomas W. Meachem
- Products: Water and air-cooled motor and marine engines, trucks
- Number of employees: 600 in 1916

The Palmer-Moore Company (1906–1918) was a manufacturer of gasoline and air-cooled motor engines and marine engines in Syracuse, New York. The company began production of commercial trucks beginning in 1912. They were the third manufacturer in the city in the business and specialized in the manufacture of custom designs for local industries.

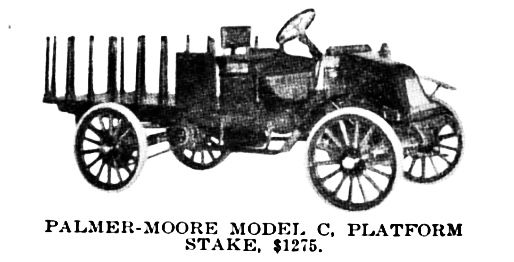
Palmer-Moore Model C (1913-1914) 0,75 t

The Palmer Moore Type C was one of the first automobiles of the company. The vehicle, with a payload of 750 kg, was designed as a flatbed truck. The flatbed had dimensions of 1118 mm by 2032 mm. The engine was a three-cylinder with 2471 cc with a bore of 101.6 mm and a stroke of 101.6 mm. The engine power was 32 hp.

== Advertisements ==
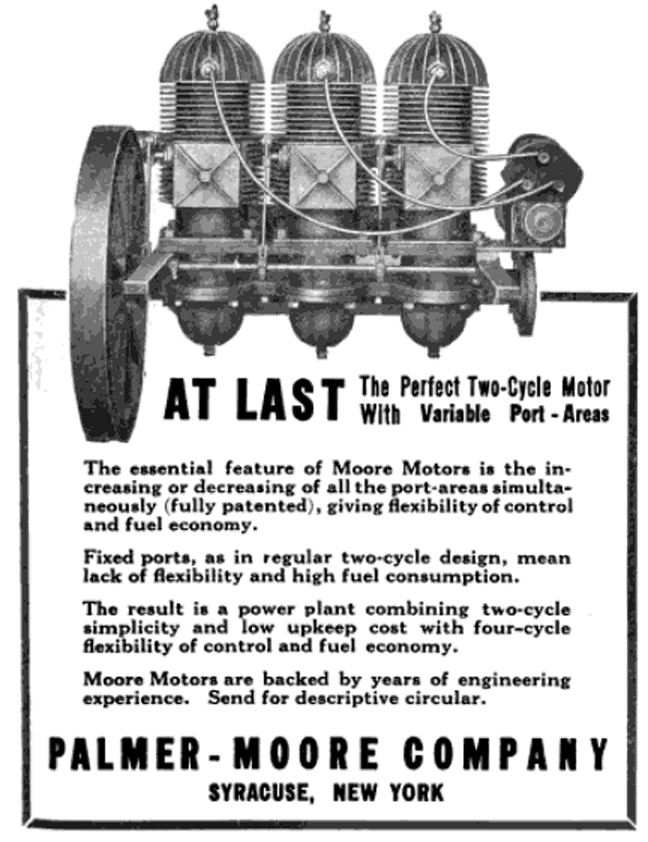
Palmer-Moore, "Moore Motors" - Power Wagons, June, 1912

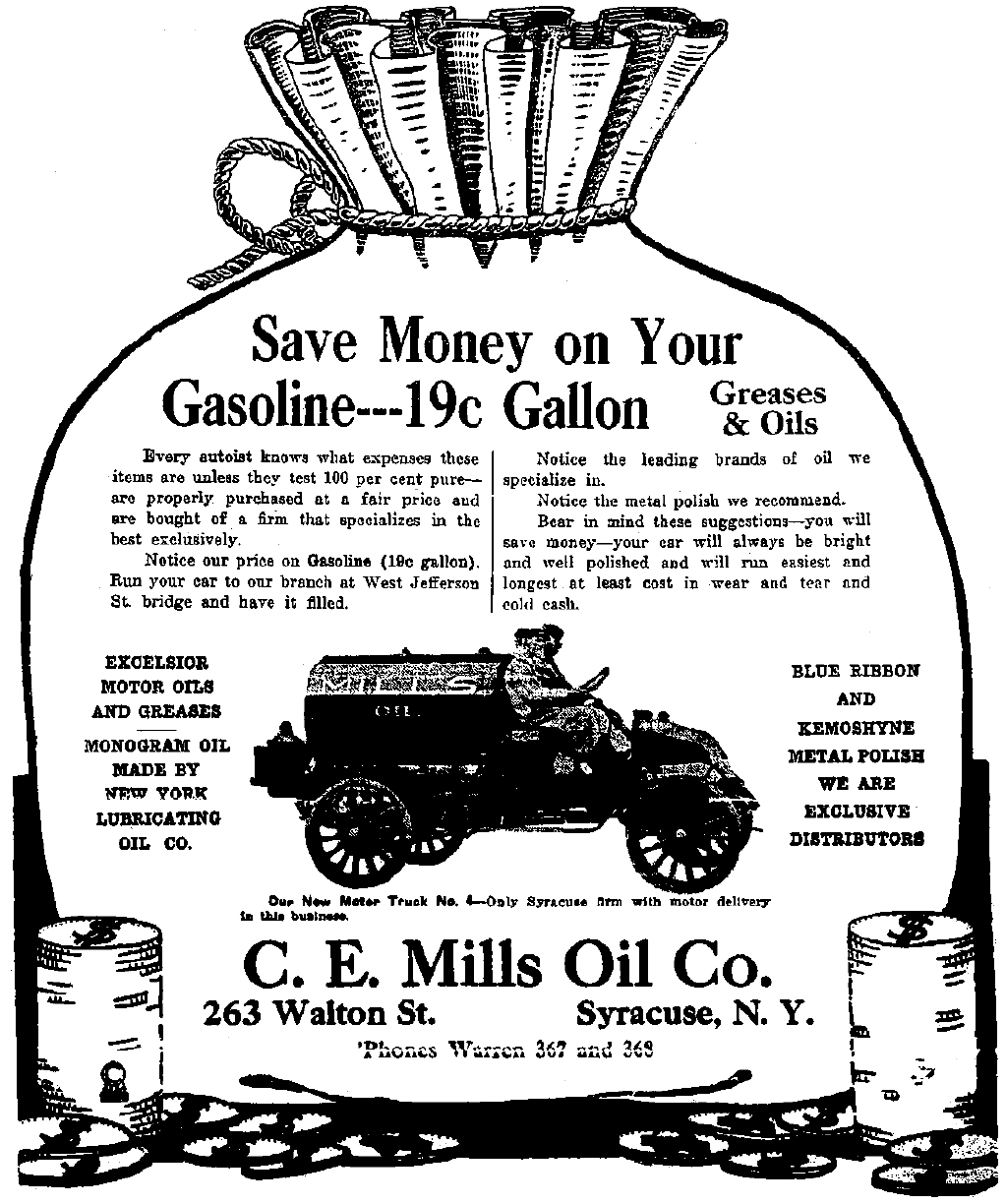
C. E. Mills Oil Company Advertisement and their new Palmer-Moore truck in June, 1913 - Syracuse Herald, June 22, 1913

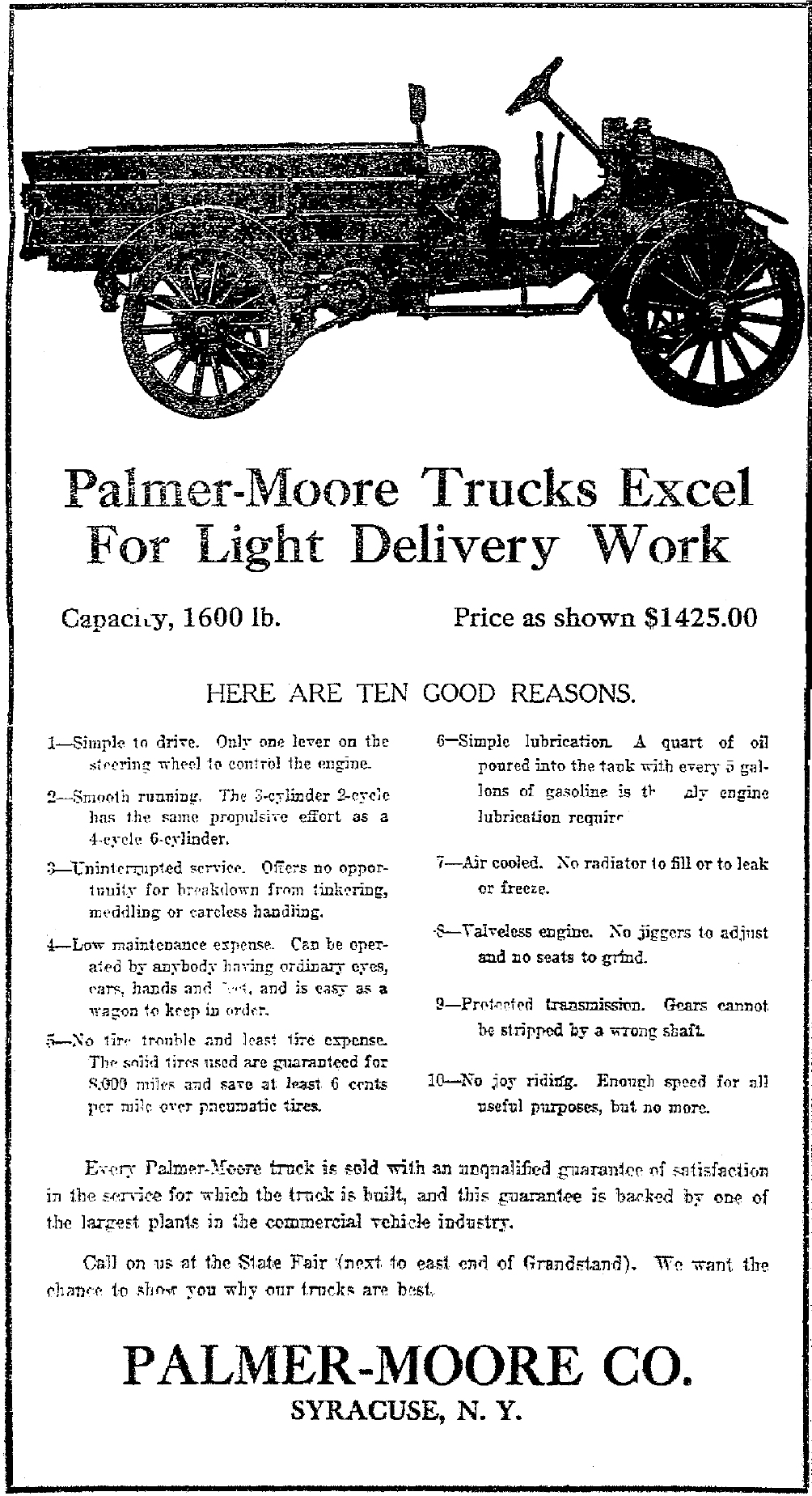
Palmer-Moore Company - Advertisement 1913 - "Low maintenance expense. Can be operated by anybody having ordinary eyes, ears, hands and feet, and is easy as a wagon to keep in order" - Syracuse Herald, September 7, 1913

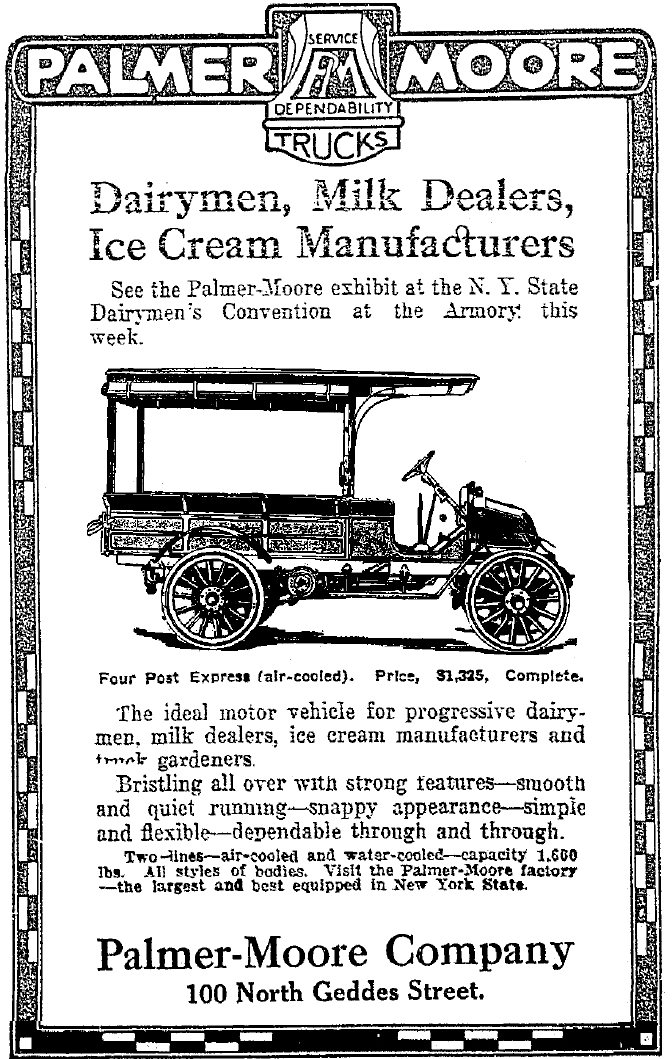
Palmer-Moore Company - 1913 "Dairymen, Milk Dealers and Ice Cream Manufacturers - Syracuse Herald, December 7, 1914

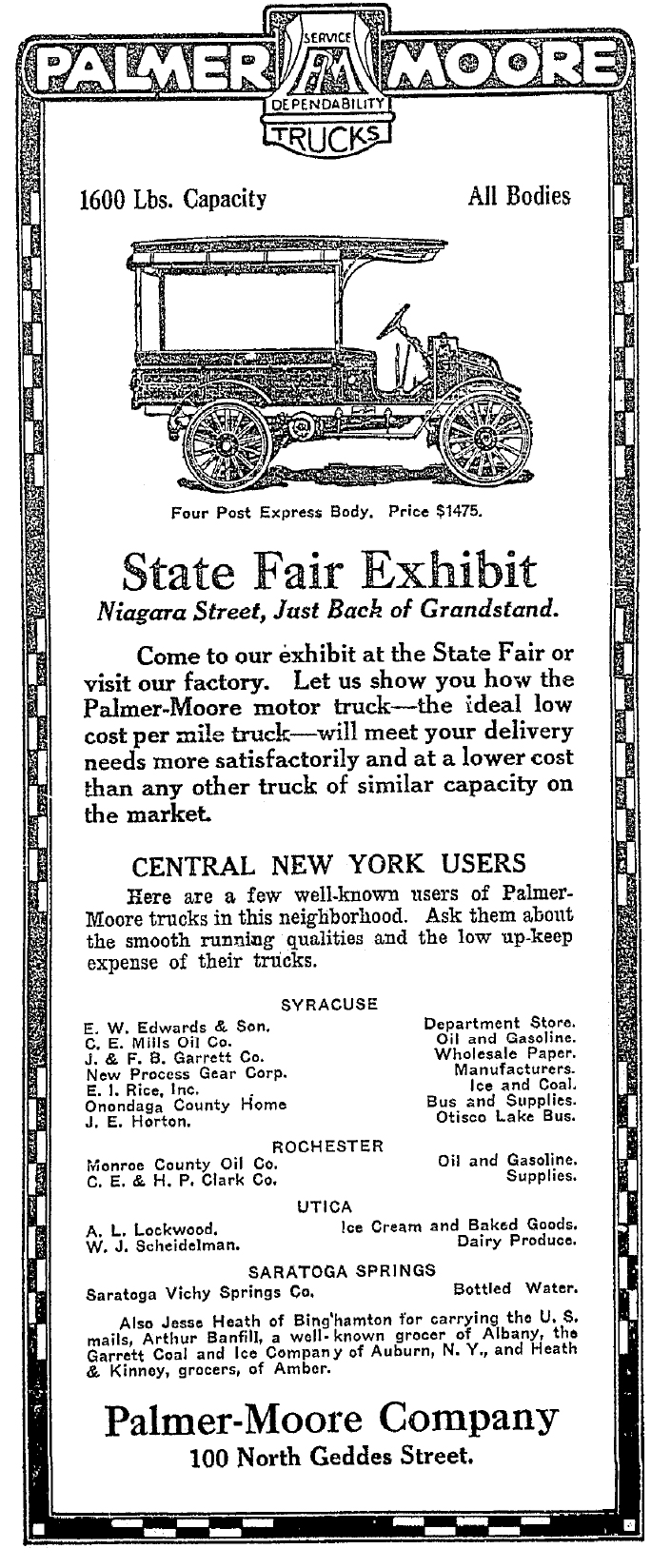
Palmer-Moore Company Advertisement - State Fair Exhibit - Syracuse Herald, August 30, 1914

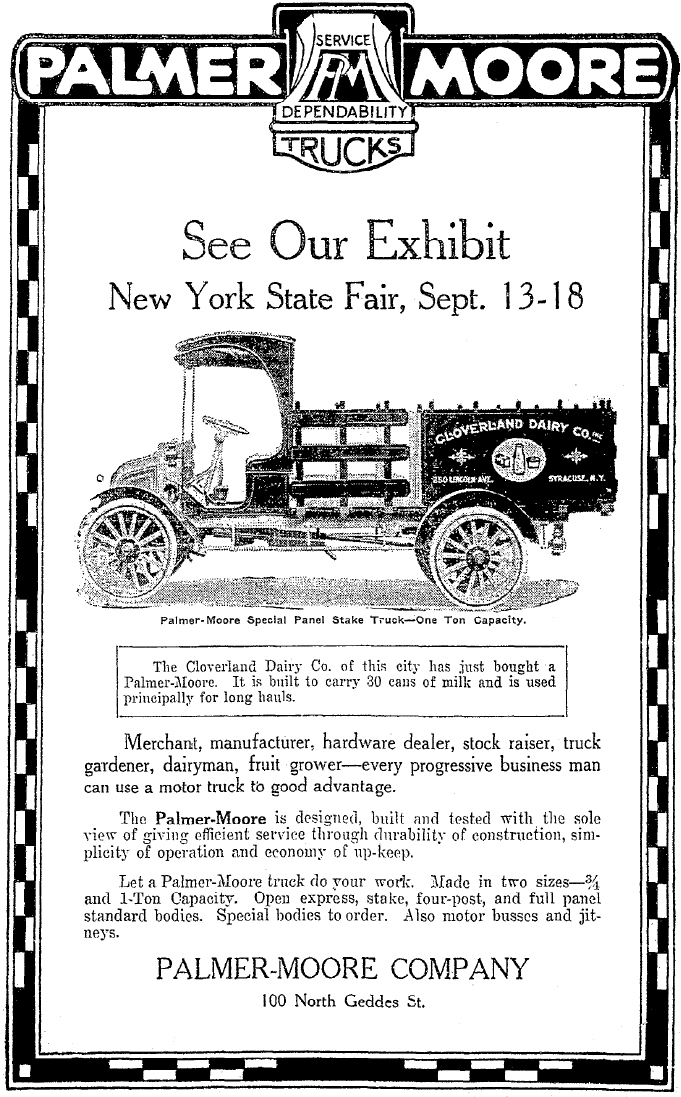
Palmer-Moore Company Advertisement - "Cloverleaf Dairy" - Syracuse Herald, September 12, 1915

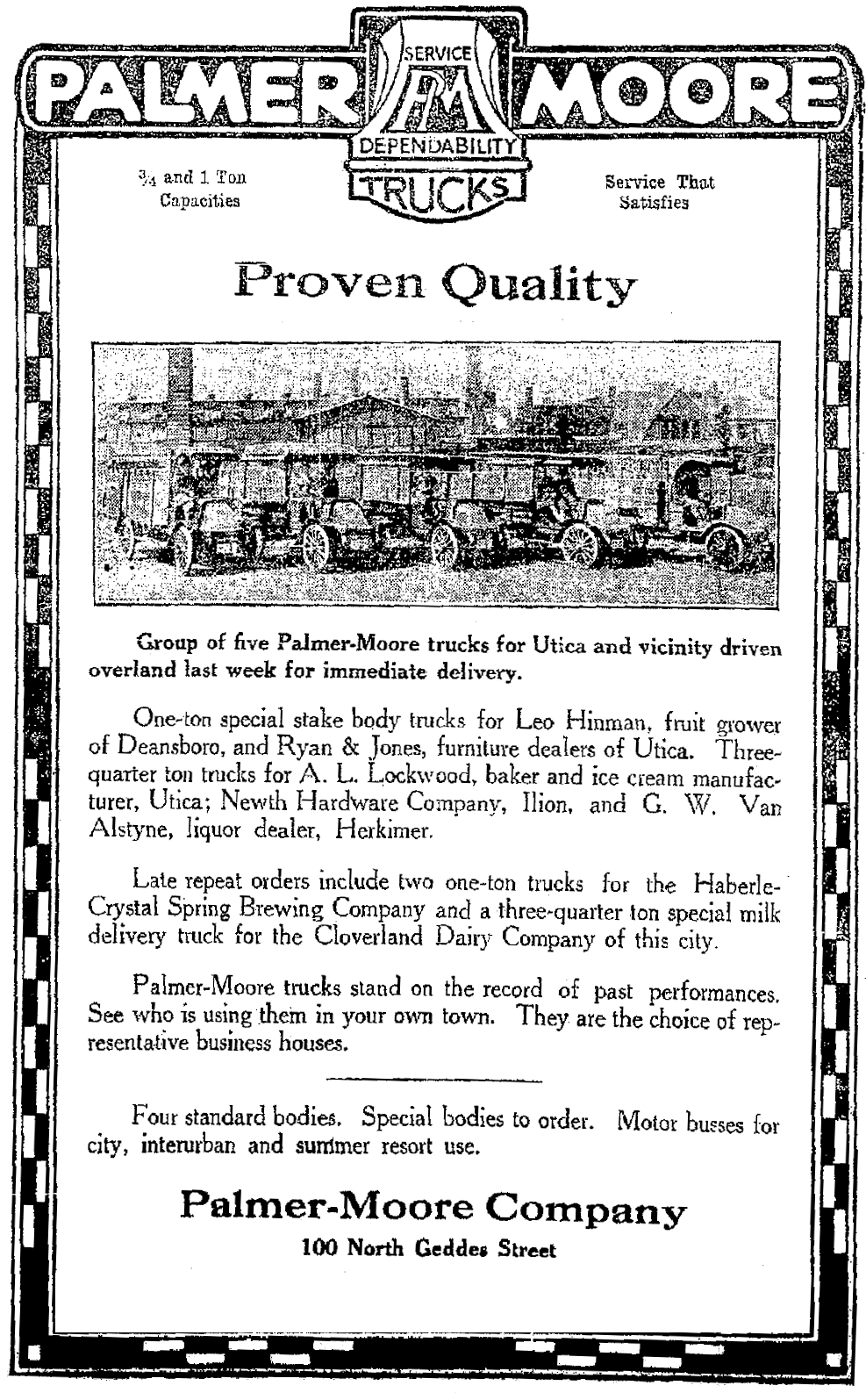
Palmer-Moore Company - Group of five Palmer-Moore trucks for Utica, New York - Syracuse Herald, April 9, 1916

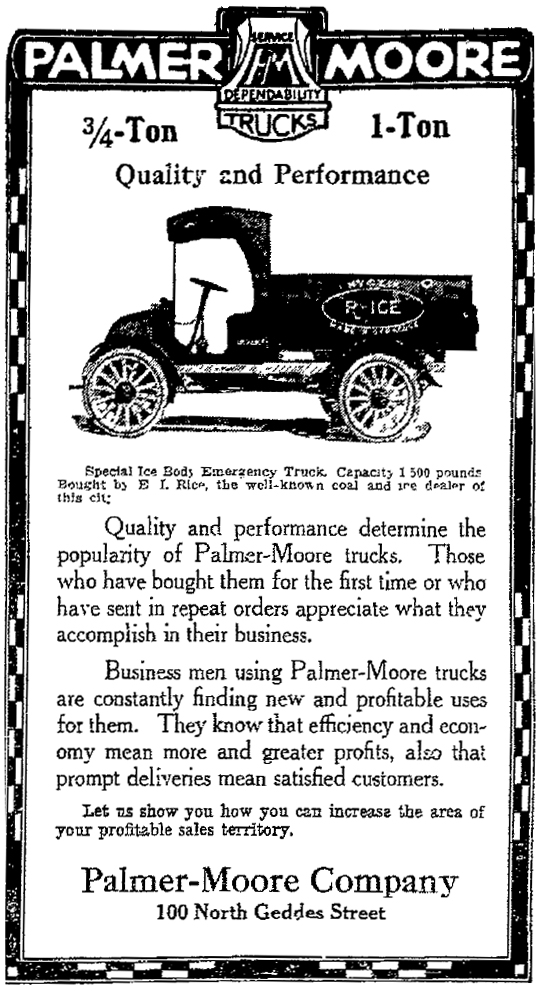
Palmer-Moore Company Advertisement - "Special Ice Body Emergency Truck" - Syracuse Herald, July 23, 1916

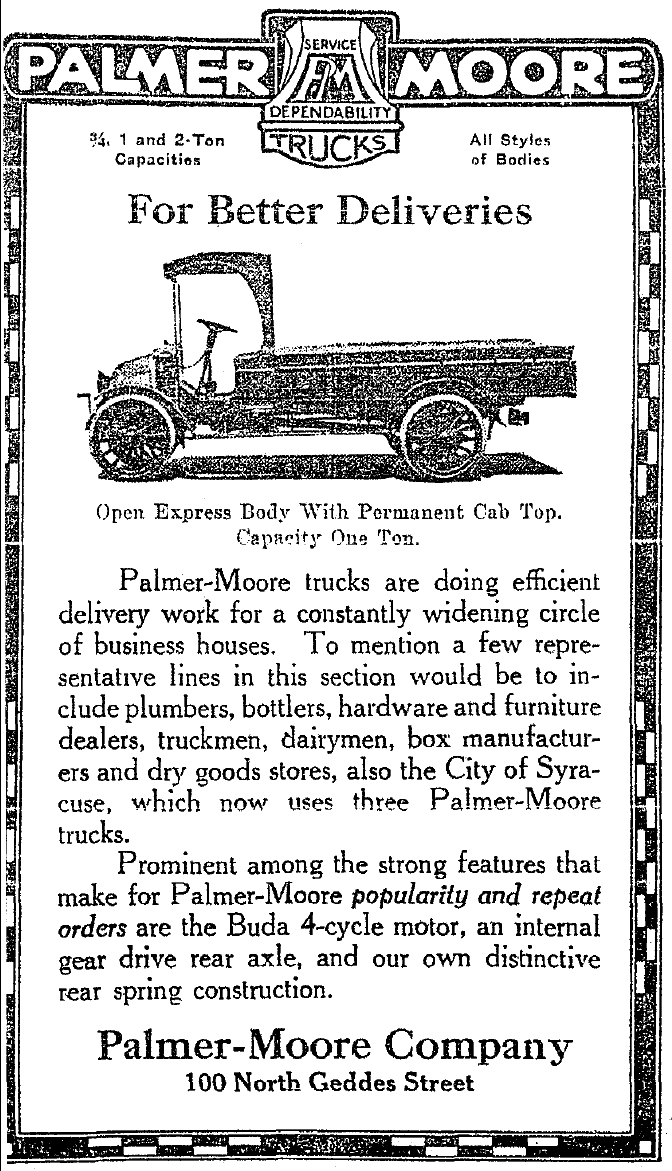
Palmer-Moore Company Advertisement "Open Express Body" - Syracuse Herald, October 29, 1916

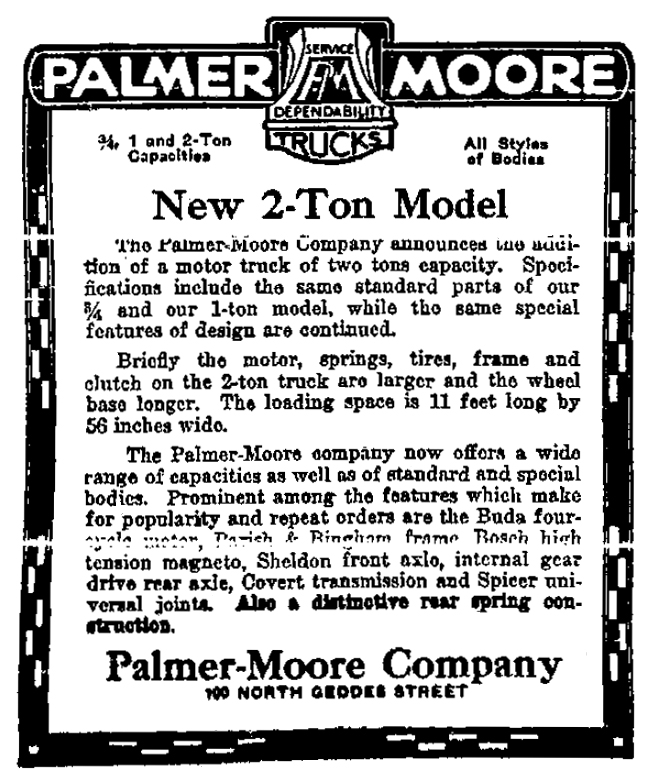
Palmer-Moore Company Advertisement "New two-ton model" - Syracuse Herald, November 5, 1916
