= Lincoln Verduga Loor =

Ecuadorian journalist and politician

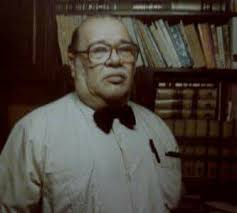

Senator of Ecuador
- In office 1967–1968

Personal details
- Born: December 25, 1917 Chone, Ecuador
- Died: January 15, 2009 (aged 91) Portoviejo, Ecuador
- Party: Concentration of People's Forces, Social Christian Party
- Spouses: Ney Bonilla (m. 1935; div. 1946) Lilian Palma (m. 1948; div. 1962) Hilda Amancha (m. 1967; div. 1975) Virginia Lara (m. 1975)
- Children: Carlos Lincoln, Edwin Wilson Enrique, Lincoln Enrique, Lilian Asunción, Lily Cecilia, Ramón Danilo, Iván Marcelo and Lastenia Guadalupe.
- Parent(s): Ramón Verduga, Lastenia Loor.

Lincoln Savonarola Verduga Loor (Chone, December 25, 1917 - Portoviejo, January 15, 2009) was an Ecuadorian journalist and politician known for a long career in public service in his country.

== Biography ==
Lincoln Verduga Loor was the sixth of ten brethren children of Ramon Verduga Cornejo, hero of the liberal revolution, and former mayor of Chone, and his wife Lastenia Loor Montesdeoca. The Verduga Family was recognized for being journalists, deputies and ministers.

== Public career ==
Lincoln made his primary education at the centenary school of Chone, Juan Montalvo; and secondary at Pedro Carbo College in Bahía de Caráquez and then specializes in Quito Technique Central in Graphic Arts, which included at the time the typesetter and photoengraver specialty.

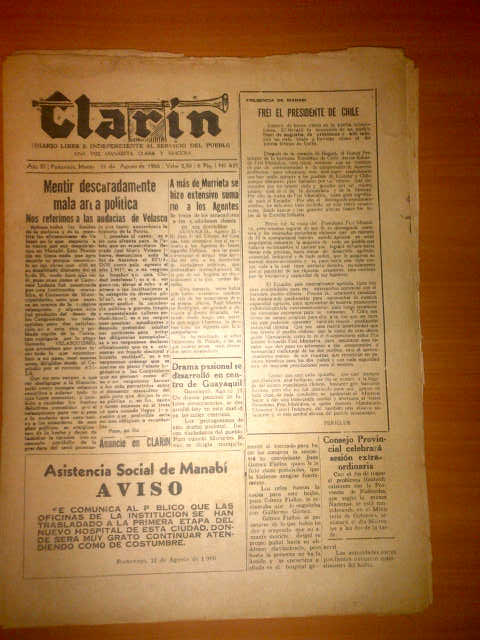
"El Clarín" newspaper, referring in harsh terms to the president Velasco Ibarra.

From an early age he excelled in public activity being his first work at age 17, to oversee the work of the road Chone-Quito with Engineer Isaac Solórzano.

He was director of the extinct CRM by seven occasions, Director of the Civil Registry of Portoviejo in the year 1966 and appears also as Secretary of the Interior of Manabi. In 1966, made a milestone in his journalist, along with his brother Franklin, founding the newspaper "El Popular", which later was renamed to "El Clarín", from which fought hard, populist and anti-democratic policies of former President José María Velasco Ibarra.

Due to the strong opposition of the Verduga brothers to the Velasquism, the former president sent fire facilities of "El Clarin", ending their issues, but not the journalistic career of Lincoln, who through his career, he became Senator for the Ecuadorian press 1967. From the Senate, prompted several Bills and Constitutional reforms.

His public life was when he and his brothers Wilson and Franklin, and the management of Medardo Mora, contributed to the creation of the Lay University Eloy Alfaro of Manabi, and with Dr. Ruben Dario Morales, managed the extension of the Lay University Vicente Rocafuerte in Portoviejo, which later became the San Gregorio University of Portoviejo.

== Last years ==
During the last stage of his life, he married with Virginia Lara Murillo in subsequent nuptials, and developed as Head of Placements in the Ministry of Labour, retiring in 1991. being the last public office he held. Lincoln died as the result of a long illness on January 15, 2009, leaving a legacy to journalism in Ecuador, specifically in Manabí.

== See also ==
- Chone, Ecuador
