= November 1917 =

Month in 1917

<<	November 1917					>>
Su	Mo	Tu	We	Th	Fr	Sa
				1	2	3
4	5	6	7	8	9	10
11	12	13	14	15	16	17
18	19	20	21	22	23	24
25	26	27	28	29	30

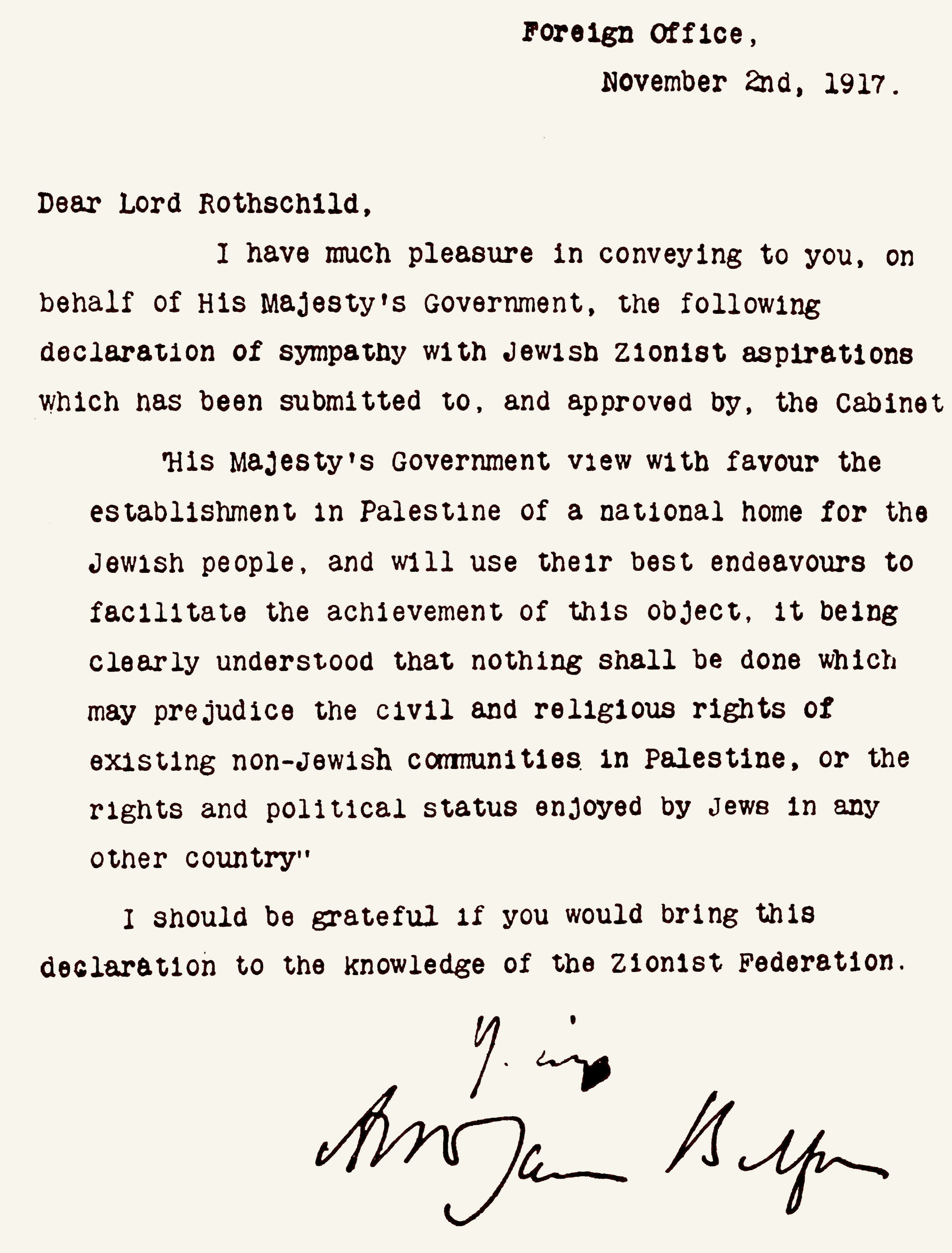
November 2: The Balfour Declaration as written by Foreign Secretary Arthur Balfour.

The following events occurred in November 1917:

== November 1, 1917 (Thursday) ==
- Third Battle of Gaza – The British 21st Corps of the Egyptian Expeditionary Force attacked and captured Umbrella hill, a massive sand dune defense held by the Ottomans west of Gaza.
- Battle of Tel el Khuweilfe – The British Desert Mounted Corps began attacking Ottoman positions on the north of Beersheba, Palestine towards Hebron and Jerusalem.
- The Australian Corps was established to replace the First ANZAC Corps while Second ANZAC became part of the British 22nd Corps.
- British submarine HMS E52 torpedoed and sunk German submarine SM UC-63 in the English Channel with all 26 crew lost.
- The Royal Flying Corps established air squadron No. 110.
- The Corpo Aeronautico Militare (Military Aviation Corps) of the Italian Army established its first naval air squadron 260a Squadriglia to defend the shipping lanes in the Adriatic Sea.
- Takatoku station, now known as Shin-Takatoku Station on Tobu Railway's Tobu Kinugawa Line, opened in Nikkō, Japan.
- Born:
  - Huelet Benner, American sharpshooter, gold medalist at the 1952 Summer Olympics; in Paragould, Arkansas, United States (d. 1999)
  - Kaisyn Kuliev, Soviet poet, known for his poetry collections including The Wounded Stone and A Beauty of the Earth; in Upper Chegem, Mountainous Republic of the Northern Caucasus (d. 1985)
  - R. W. B. Lewis, American literary critic, recipient of the 1976 Pulitzer Prize for the biography of Edith Wharton; as Richard Warrington Baldwin Lewis, in Chicago, United States (d. 2002)
  - Clarence E. Miller, American politician, U.S. Representative of Ohio from 1967 to 1993; in Lancaster, Ohio, United States (d. 2011)
  - Erich Rudorffer, German fighter pilot, member of the Luftwaffe during World War II with 222 victories claimed, ranking him the 7th most successful fighter pilot ever in air warfare, recipient of the Knight's Cross of the Iron Cross; in Zwochau, German Empire (present-day Germany) (d. 2016)
- Died: Leslie Maygar, 49, Australian army officer, recipient of the Victoria Cross for action during the Second Boer War; died from wounds sustained at the Battle of Beersheba (b. 1868)

== November 2, 1917 (Friday) ==
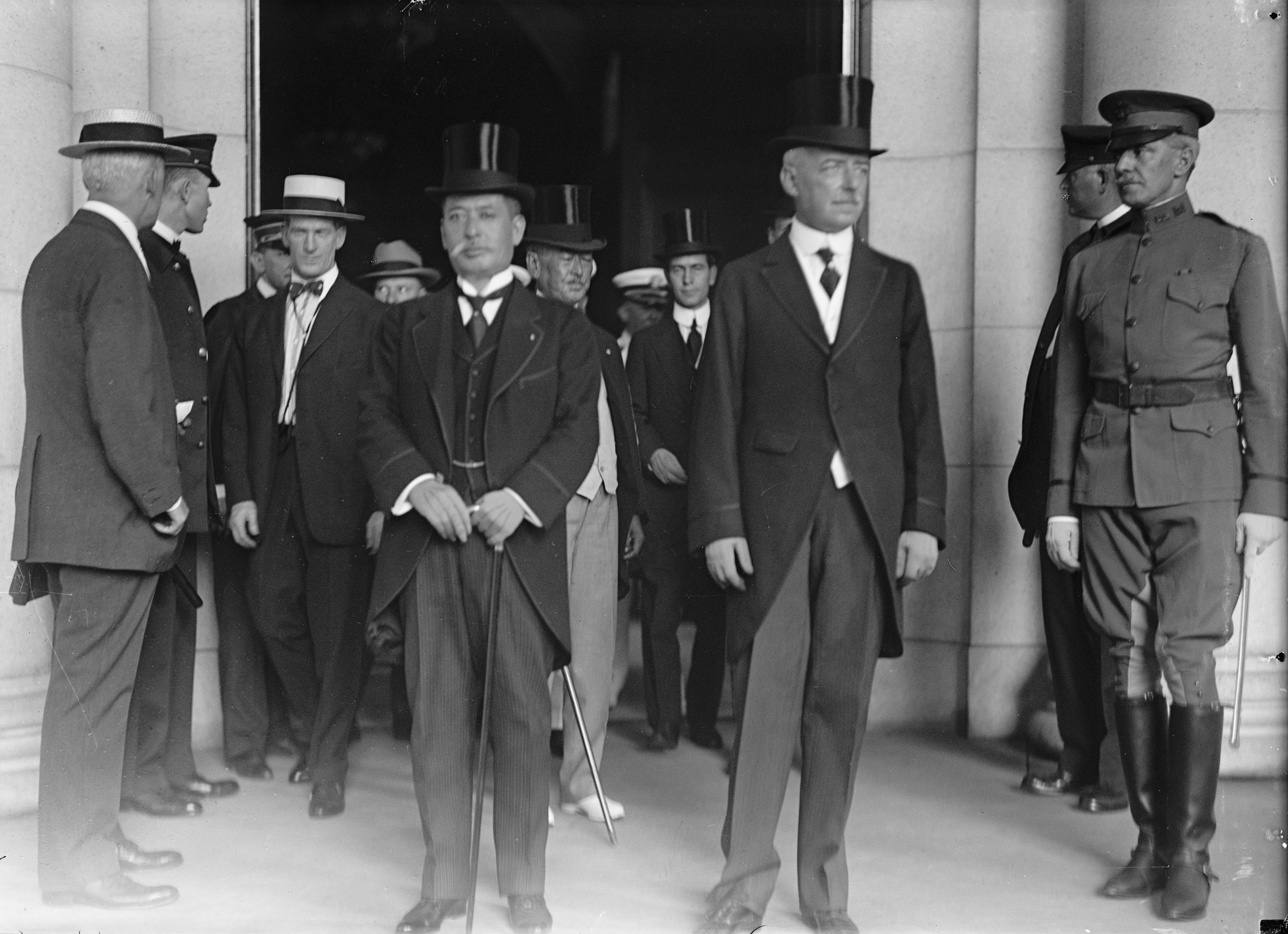
Japanese diplomat Ishii Kikujirō meeting with United States Secretary of State Robert Lansing in Washington, D.C. to sign the Lansing–Ishii Agreement.

- British Foreign Secretary Arthur Balfour made the Balfour Declaration, proclaiming British support for the "establishment in Palestine of a national home for the Jewish people..., it being clearly understood that nothing shall be done which may prejudice the civil and religious rights of existing non-Jewish communities".
- The Lansing–Ishii Agreement was signed between Japan and the United States, with the U.S. recognizing Japan had special interests in mainland China.
- Battle of Caporetto – The Italian Second Army completed its retreat to Tagliamento river, which allowed German forces to establish a bridgehead.
- Third Battle of Gaza – British overran Ottoman trenches around the El Arish and Jafa Redoubts south of Gaza, while suffering 350 killed, 350 missing and over 2,000 wounded.
- Battle of Tel el Khuweilfe – British forces advanced in Palestine to establish a new front line stretching from Dayr al-Hawa in the south to Beit Liqya in the north.
- United States Army Colonel Brice Disque introduced his plan to put the entire Pacific Northwest lumber industry under military control for the duration of World War I, leading to the creation of the Loyal Legion of Loggers and Lumbermen.
- Born:
  - Ann Rutherford, Canadian-born American actress, known for roles in Gone with the Wind and the Andy Hardy series with Mickey Rooney; as Therese Ann Rutherford, in Vancouver, Canada (d. 2012)
  - Robert Hampton Gray, Canadian naval officer, recipient of the Victoria Cross for action the Pacific Theater during World War II, last Canadian to receive the Victoria Cross; in Trail, British Columbia, Canada (d. 1945, killed in action)
- Died: Fred Billington, 63, British opera singer, best known for his work with the D'Oyly Carte Opera Company in London (b. 1854)

== November 3, 1917 (Saturday) ==
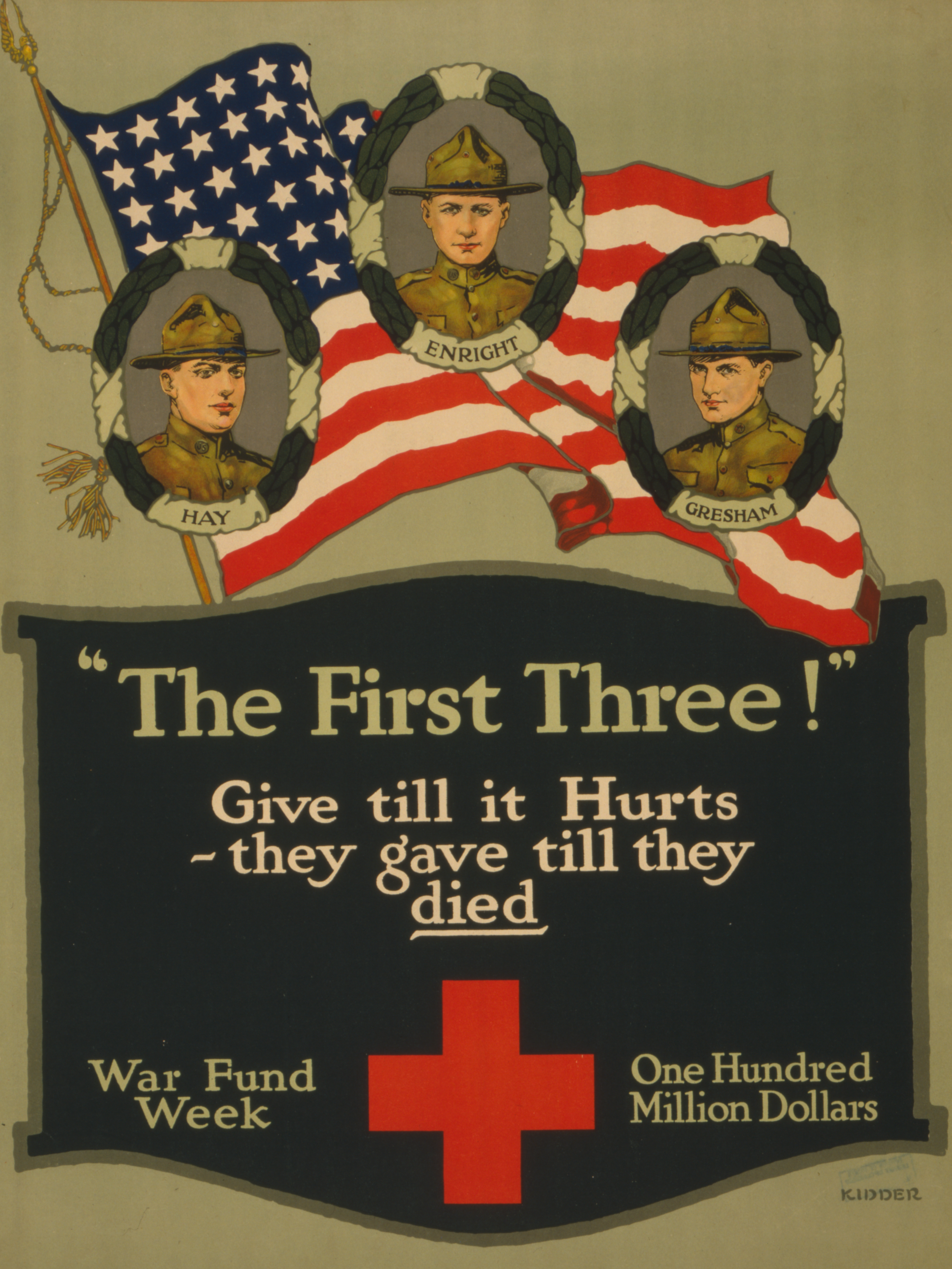
Poster of the first three American soldiers to die fighting in World War I: Merle Hay, Thomas Enright and James Bethel Gresham.

- Third Battle of Gaza – Ottoman defenders launched counterattacks to stem the British advance south and east of Gaza.
- Battle of Moon Sound – The Imperial German Navy succeeded in clearing the minefields around the Gulf of Riga in the Baltic Sea and ensuring Germany had full control of the West Estonian archipelago. The operation resulted in major casualties, including 156 dead, 60 wounded, and the loss of nine minesweepers and numerous smaller vessels. The Imperial German Army also sustained 54 dead and 141 wounded while taking control of the islands during Operation Albion. Russian casualties were smaller but significant numbers of men and equipment were captured, including 20,130 prisoners and 141 guns.
- Soldiers Thomas Enright, James Bethel Gresham, and Merle Hay of the 16th Infantry Regiment, 1st Infantry Division of the United States Army became the first official American military casualties of World War I. All three were killed in action during a German attack near Artois, France.
- German submarine SM UC-65 was torpedoed and sunk in the North Sea by British submarine HMS C15 with the loss of all 26 crew.
- CONCANACO, the Confederation of the National Chambers of Commerce in Mexico, was established.
- Born:
  - Conor Cruise O'Brien, Irish politician, member of the Dáil Éireann (Irish legislature) from 1969 to 1977, and Seanad Éireann (Irish Senate) from 1977 to 1979; as Donal Conor David Dermot Donat Cruise O'Brien, in Dublin, Ireland (d. 2008)
  - J. E. Macdonnell, Australian writer, best known for over 200 books based on sea and naval experiences, including the Horwitz Naval Series; as James Edmond Macdonnell, in Mackay, Queensland, Australia (d. 2002)
- Died:
  - Frederick Rodgers, 75, American naval officer, last commander of the Asiatic Squadron (b. 1842)
  - Léon Bloy, 71, French writer, author of The Woman Who Was Poor and Disagreeable Tales (b. 1846)
  - Albert Carman, 79, Canadian religious leader, head of the Methodist Church of Canada during the 1870s and 1880s (b. 1833)

== November 4, 1917 (Sunday) ==
- An early morning fire killed at least 19 men who had spent the night at the Salvation Army Rescue Mission in Paterson, New Jersey, a four-story brick building at 42 Mill Street. The flames blocked residents from the building's lone fire escape, and forced people on the third and fourth floors to leap toward rescue nets, with 11 men injured, two of them fatally.
- Born:
  - Leonardo Cimino, American actor, best known for his award-winning stage performances in The Brothers Karamazov, A Memory of Two Mondays and The Man in the Glass Booth; in New York City, United States (d. 2012)
  - Virginia Field, British-born American actress, best known for her television work in Perry Mason and The Rebel; as Margaret St. John Field, in London, England (d. 1992)
- Died: Leopoldo Franchetti, 70, Italian politician, one the first Italian politicians to lead an inquiry into the Sicilian Mafia (b. 1847)

== November 5, 1917 (Monday) ==
- The Rapallo Conference in Rapallo, Italy, was convened by the Allied powers in the wake of the severe Italian setback at Caporetto. The conference decided to form a Supreme War Council at Versailles, France, to co-ordinate allied plans and actions and promised fresh aid to the Italians.
- Third Battle of Gaza – Continuous artillery barrages and low ammo forced the Ottoman command to consider a strategic withdraw from Gaza to Wadi el Hesi to the northeast.
- Buchanan v. Warley was decided by the Supreme Court of the United States, which stated designating neighborhoods to only sell only to members of a specific racial or ethnic group was unconstitutional.
- Born:
  - Jacqueline Auriol, French aviator, one the first female test pilots and holder of five speed records, founding member of Académie de l'air et de l'espace; as Jacqueline Marie-Thérèse Suzanne Douet, in Challans, France (d. 2000)
  - Jens Evensen, Norwegian judge, member of the International Court of Justice from 1980 to 1993; in Christiania, Norway (present-day Oslo, Norway) (d. 2004)
  - Sal Bartolo, American boxer, world featherweight champion from 1944 to 1946; as Salvatore Interbartolo, in Boston, United States (d. 2002)

== November 6, 1917 (Tuesday) ==
- Second Battle of Passchendaele – British and Canadian forces made one final push and captured Passchendaele, Belgium, after three months of bitter fighting.
- Battle of Hareira and Sheria – The British 20th Corps and Desert Mounted Corps attacked Ottoman defenses protecting the Gaza to Beersheba road, opening Gaza for capture.
- Battle of Tel el Khuweilfe – Australian, New Zealand and Welsh brigades secured territory around Tel el Khuweilfe in Palestine, ending the fighting.
- Westmoreland Davis was elected as the 48th Governor of Virginia after capturing 70 percent of the vote in the Virginia state election.
- John Francis Hylan beat John Purroy Mitchel in city elections to become the 96th Mayor of New York City.
- State elections were held in New York, with Merton E. Lewis elected to the Attorney General of New York office.
- The Royal Flying Corps established air squadrons No. 191.
- The Spruce Production Division was established with Colonel Brice Disque commanding, to ensure lumber material in the Pacific Northwest was being transferred for military use, including aircraft construction for the Aviation Section of the U.S. Signal Corps.
- British public servant Francis Hopwood was awarded the noble title Baron Southborough for his work for the Secretary of State for the Colonies.
- Born:
  - Karan Dewan, Indian actor, known for roles in Rattan, Bahar and Teen Batti Char Raasta; as Dewan Karan Chopra, in Gujranwala, Punjab, British India (present-day Pakistan) (d. 1979)
  - Edgar Whitcomb, American politician, 43rd Governor of Indiana; in Hayden, Indiana, United States (d. 2016)

== November 7, 1917 (Wednesday) ==
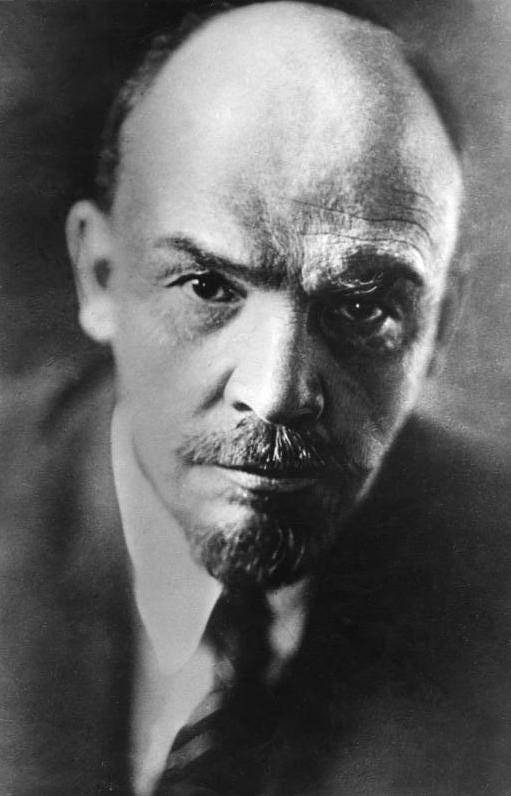
Vladimir Lenin Becomes Soviet Russia's First Leader Following his Seizure of Power during the Bolshevik Revolution

- October Revolution – The Bolsheviks organized an armed uprising in Petrograd to overthrow the Russian Provisional Government after eight months of rule:
  - The second All-Russian Congress of Soviets, now dominated by the Bolsheviks, passed a resolution formally recognizing the right to overthrow the government. The center and right wing groups of the Congress protested what they felt was an illegal seizure of power and walked out before the resolution was passed. Leon Trotsky famously taunted them as they left: "Go where you belong from now on — into the dustbin of history!"
  - Vladimir Lenin distributed a proclamation by telegram throughout Russia informing citizens of the overthrow of the government.
  - Bolshevik forces stormed the Winter Palace with little resistance and arrested the remaining members of the Russian Provisional Government.
  - Minister-Chairman Alexander Kerensky of the Russian Provisional Government fled Petrograd to Pskov to rally pro-government military support.
- The Regional Committee in Protection of Revolution in Ukraine was formed by the Central Council of Ukraine, but was dissolved in two days and authority transferred to the General Secretariat of Ukraine.
- Third Battle of Gaza – British 21st Corps occupied Gaza after confirming the Ottoman Army garrison had abandoned the city.
- Battle of Hareira and Sheria – British 20th Corps and Desert Mounted Corps captured Hareira and Sheria, marking the end of the Ottoman Gaza to Beersheba line.
- Units with the Ottoman Eighth Army delayed the advance of the British 21st Corps and the Desert Mounted Corps with a rearguard defense at Wadi el Hesi, Palestine.
- Charge at Sheria – The retreating Yildirim Army Group of the Ottoman Empire successfully held off pursuing cavalry of the Australian 4th Light Horse Brigade and made it safely to the Judaean Mountains to regroup.
- Women won the right to vote in New York.
- A branch of the Ku Klux Klan, known as the Knights of Liberty, abducted and tortured 17 Industrial Workers of the World union members under police custody in Tulsa, Oklahoma.
- The Luftstreitkräfte, the air arm of the Imperial German Army, established air squadron Jagdstaffel 79.
- The British noble title Marquess of Carisbrooke was created for Prince Alexander Mountbatten and lasted until 1960.
- The People's Commissariat for Posts and Telegraphs for Russia was established in Petrograd.
- Born: Edith Bouvier Beale, American socialite, best known as the subject of the documentary Grey Gardens with her mother Edith Ewing Bouvier Beale, first cousin to Jacqueline Kennedy Onassis; in New York City, United States (d. 2002)

== November 8, 1917 (Thursday) ==
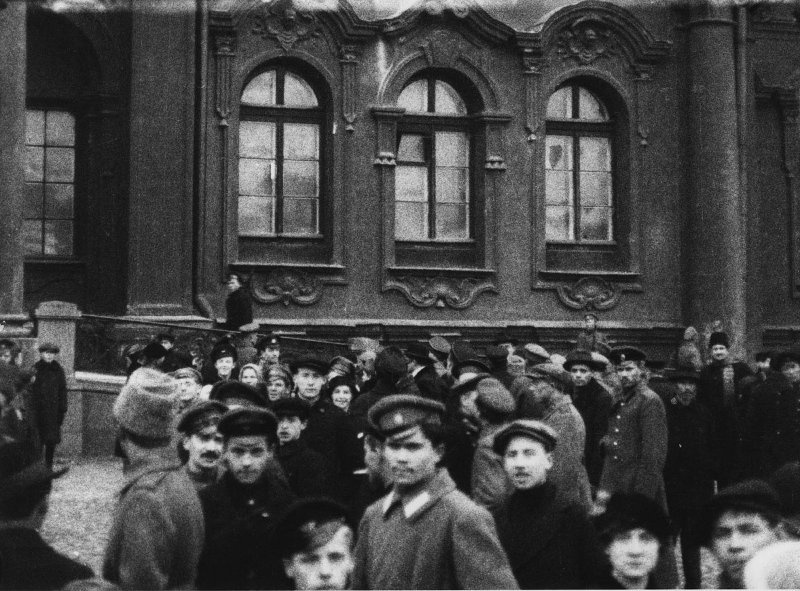
The Winter Palace in Petrograd the day after it was captured by the Bolsheviks.

- October Revolution – The Russian Soviet Federative Socialist Republic was established, with the All-Russian Congress of Soviets forming the first Council of People's Commissars with Vladimir Lenin as leader. The council's first action was to release the Decree on Land, which abolished all private property so estates could be redistributed among the peasantry.
- A Bolshevik uprising of 6,000 led by Georgy Pyatakov in Kiev occurred in opposition to the creation of a revolutionary committee by the Central Council of Ukraine as a temporary government.
- British forces began an assault on Ottoman defenses at Wadi el Hesi, Palestine.
- Charge at Huj – Cavalry with the British 5th Mounted Brigade successfully captured several Ottoman rearguard defense positions from the Yildirim Army Group at Huj, Gaza, Palestine. The British inflicted more than 100 casualties and captured 70 prisoners and 15 guns, while suffering 26 killed and 40 wounded. The battle was considered the last major action of traditional British cavalry in modern warfare.
- The Titles Deprivation Act was given royal assent which authorized enemies of the United Kingdom during World War I that had British peerages or royal titles to be deprived of them. This included many German nobles that shared British titles through lineage from the marriage between Queen Victoria and Prince Albert.
- Died:
  - Colin Blythe, 38, English cricketer, bowler for the Kent County Cricket Club and England cricket team from 1899 to 1914; killed in action at Passchendaele (b. 1879)
  - Milutin Bojić, 25, Serbian poet, known for his poetry collection Songs of Pride and Suffering; died of tuberculosis (b. 1892)

== November 9, 1917 (Friday) ==
- Vladimir Lenin published his Decree on Peace in the newspaper Izvestia, which proposed Russia withdraw from World War I.
- General Luigi Cadorna was relieved of command of the Italian army, after Italy's allies France and the United Kingdom, which had sent eleven divisions to reinforce the Italian front, insisted on his dismissal. The new Italian Prime Minister Vittorio Emanuele Orlando appointed the respected General Armando Diaz as Chief of General Staff.
- Sfatul Țării, the governing council of Bessarabia within the dissolving Russian Empire, was established to hold elections for its deputies.
- British forces captured Wadi el Hesi, Palestine from the Ottoman soldiers at a total cost of 700 casualties.
- The entire text of the Balfour Declaration was released to the news press a week after it was signed.
- Argentine animator Quirino Cristiani released El Apóstol, the first feature-length animated film in Argentina. The film was a political satire on Argentine president Hipólito Yrigoyen.
- Died: Harry Trott, 51, Australian cricketer, all-rounder for the Victoria cricket team and the Australia national cricket team from 1886 to 1908 (b. 1866)

== November 10, 1917 (Saturday) ==
- Second Battle of Passchendaele – British and Canadian forces made further territorial gains around to strengthen their hold on the defensive ridge between the villages of Westrozebeke and Passchendaele in Belgium, ending the three-month long campaign. British casualties were heavy, with British Fifth Army sustaining 14,219, and Second Army suffering 29,454. The Canadian Corps suffered major casualties, totaling 15,654 men killed or wounded since October 26 to November 10. German casualties were reported to be 20,500 in late October and 9,500 casualties for the first half of November.
- Battle of Caporetto – The Italian Second Army set up a new defensive front on the Piave River that halted the advance of the Central Powers.
- Ukrainian forces in Kiev surrounded the main Bolshevik force and arrested its leaders.
- A Bolshevik uprising occurred in Vinnytsia, Ukraine that was quelled two days later.
- October Revolution – The Executive Committee of Peasants Soviets circulated posters and newspaper articles critical of the Bolsheviks uprising, stating it "refuted with indignation all participation of the organised peasantry in this criminal violation of the will of the working class".
- The Kremlin Wall Necropolis was created with the burial of 238 Bolshevik soldiers that perished in fighting during the October Revolution near the Moscow Kremlin Wall between the Senate and Nikolskaya towers.
- Died: Thomas Simpson Sproule, 74, Canadian politician, 13th Speaker of the House of Commons (b. 1843)

== November 11, 1917 (Sunday) ==
- October Revolution – Alexander Kerensky and General Pyotr Krasnov led 700 Cossacks loyal to the Russian Provisional Government to occupy Tsarskoye Selo outside of Petrograd in an attempt to regain the Russian capital from control of the Bolsheviks. Eight riflemen with the local garrison were shot after refusing to lay down arms, resulting in the Russian military moving onside with the Bolshevik government.
- The Transcaucasian Commissariat was established to govern the newly independent Transcaucasia region of the former Russian Empire.
- German submarine SM UC-38 torpedoed and sank Royal Navy destroyer HMS Staunch and monitor ship HMS M15 in the Mediterranean Sea, killing 33 sailors in total.
- The Royal Flying Corps established air squadron No. 108.
- The U.S. Army established the 147th and 148th Aero Squadrons at Kelly Field, San Antonio.
- The U.S. Navy destroyer Little was launched by the Fore River Shipyard in Quincy, Massachusetts. It became the ship that transported U.S. President Woodrow Wilson and his delegation to the Paris Peace Conference the following year.
- The Russian daily newspaper Sankt-Peterburgskie Vedomosti (Saint Petersburg News), the country's first newspaper ever to be published, was suddenly shut down. It would not be revived until 1991 when the daily former Soviet newspaper Leningradskaya Pravda adopted the name.
- The film adaptation of the children's novel A Little Princess by Frances Hodgson Burnett was released with Mary Pickford as star as well as the film's producer. Screenwriter Frances Marion adapted it to the screen and Marshall Neilan directed.
- Born:
  - Madeleine Damerment, French spy, member of the Special Operations Executive; in Lille, France (d. 1944, executed at Dachau concentration camp)
  - Abram Hoffer, Canadian psychiatrist, known for his promotion of megavitamin therapy to treat schizophrenia; in Sonnenfeld, Canada (d. 2009)
  - Tippy Larkin, American boxer, world light welterweight champion from 1946 to 1952; as Antonio Pilliteri, in Garfield, New Jersey, United States (d. 1991)
  - Mack Reynolds, American science fiction writer, author of Black Man's Burden series, and the first Star Trek novel Mission to Horatius; as Dallas McCord Reynolds, in Corcoran, California, United States (d. 1983)
  - Tony F. Schneider, American air naval officer, commander of Bombing Squadron 9 during Operation Ten-Go in World War II, two-time recipient of the Navy Cross; in Hillsboro, Missouri, United States (d. 2010)
- Died:
  - Liliʻuokalani, 79, Hawaiian noble, last monarch of the Hawaiian Kingdom (b. 1838)
  - David Lipscomb, 86, American religious leader, one of the chief leaders of the Restoration Movement in the United States, founder of Lipscomb University (b. 1831)

== November 12, 1917 (Monday) ==
- October Revolution – The Red Guards ousted the force loyal to Alexander Kerensky out of Tsarskoye Selo.
- Sinai and Palestine campaign – Ottoman forces failed to stop the Australian Mounted Division from capturing a key junction of the Jaffa–Jerusalem railway in Palestine.
- The United States Army established the 3rd Infantry Division.
- The Ukrainian People's Army was established.
- The village of Czar, Alberta, was incorporated.
- Born:
  - Jo Stafford, American singer, known for popular hits "You Belong to Me" and "Make Love to Me"; in Coalinga, California, United States (d. 2008)
  - Joseph Coors, American business leader, president of Coors Brewing Company, grandson to Adolph Coors; in Golden, Colorado, United States (d. 2003)
  - Michael O'Riordan, Irish politician, founder of the Communist Party of Ireland and member of the Connolly Column during the Spanish Civil War; in Cork, Ireland (d. 2006)
  - Günther Schack, German air force officer, commander of Jagdgeschwader 51 and Jagdgeschwader 3 for the Luftwaffe during World War II, recipient of the Knight's Cross of the Iron Cross; in Bartenstein, German Empire (present-day Bartoszyce, Poland) (d. 2003)

== November 13, 1917 (Tuesday) ==
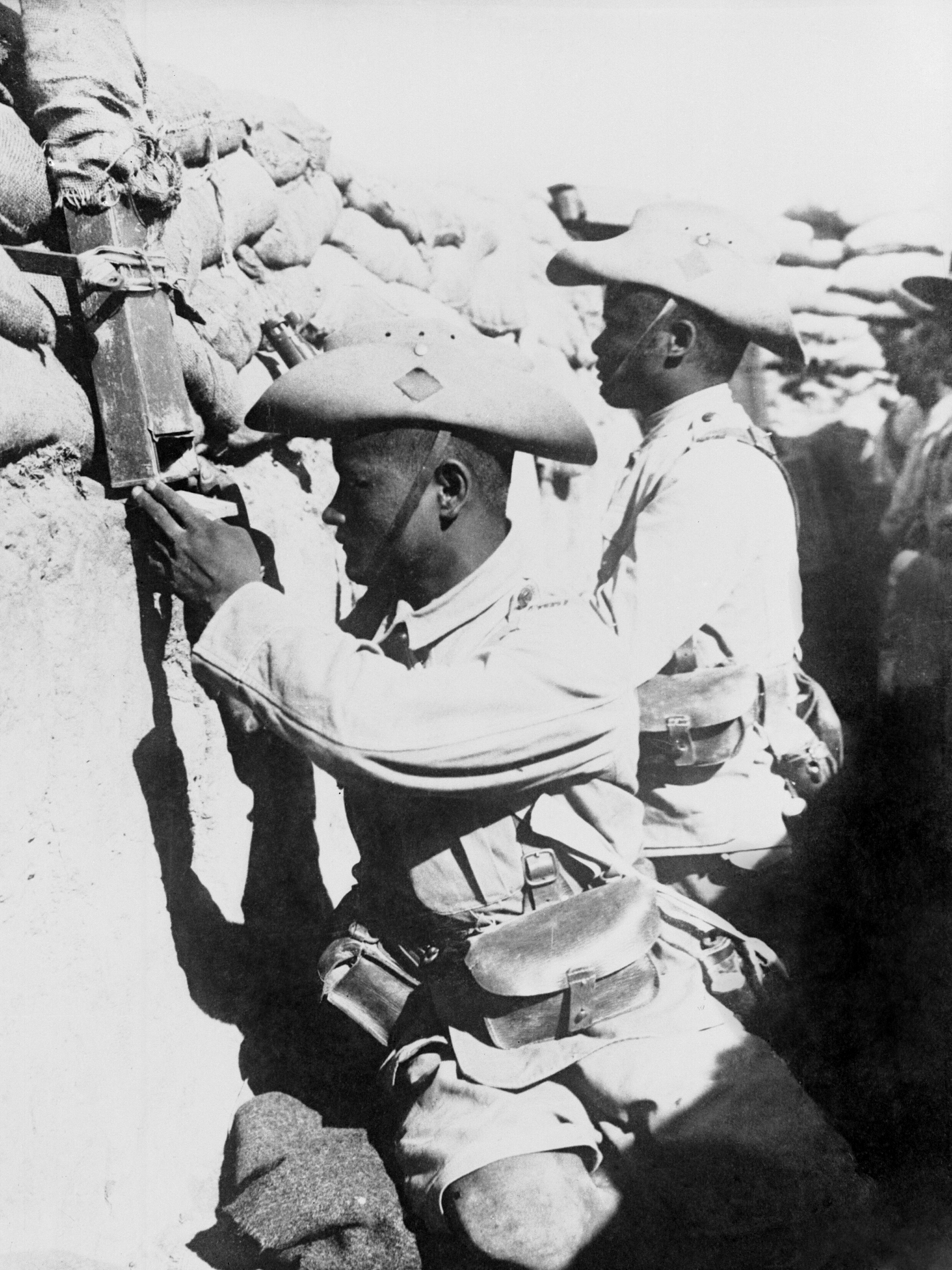
Gurkha soldiers holding front line trenches at the Battle of Mughar Ridge.

- First Battle of Monte Grappa – General Armando Diaz ordered the Italian Fourth Army to hold the line against the Austrian-German advance at Monte Grappa, which defended the left flank of the new Italian front on the Piave River.
- Battle of Mughar Ridge – The British Imperial Egyptian Expeditionary Force attacked retreating Ottoman-German Yildirim Army Group forces, killing 2,000 soldiers, capturing 10,000 Ottoman Army prisoners, 100 guns and 50 miles (80 km) of Palestine territory, with a loss of 1,188 casualties.
- October Revolution – The Red Guards defeated the last of the soldiers loyal to Pyotr Krasnov south of Petrograd and in Moscow (where 700 casualties were reported), ending the uprising.
- A ceasefire was made in Kiev between Ukrainian and Bolshevik forces.
- Irish Cargo ship Ardmore was sunk by German submarine SM U-95 in St George's Channel, killing 19 of the crew on board. SM U-95 would later be rammed and sunk on 7 January 1918
- The air military base Brooks Field was established in San Antonio, Texas.
- The School of Medicine at the University of Zagreb was established and is the oldest and biggest of the four medical schools in Croatia.
- The Lake Cargelligo railway line was completed in New South Wales, Australia.
- The Women's National Book Association was established to support and give voice to women in the book industry, and has since grown to eleven active chapters in the United States.

== November 14, 1917 (Wednesday) ==
- Battle of Ayun Kara – The ANZAC Mounted Division of the Desert Mounted Corps successfully fought off Ottoman rearguards in the aftermath of the Battle of Mughar Ridge. Ottoman forces suffered 182 killed, 300 wounded, and 34 taken prisoner along with seven guns. The New Zealand force suffered 44 dead and 141 wounded.
- Thirty-three suffragettes from the Silent Sentinels, an active arm of the National Woman's Party, were beaten and assaulted by guards while in custody at the Occoquan Workhouse in Virginia in what was referred to as the "Night of Terror".
- The 10th and 11th Indian Cavalry Brigades were established for service in the Mesopotamian campaign.
- Al McCoy lost the World Middleweight Championship title to Mike O'Dowd, who knocked him out in the 6th round during a championship boxing match in Brooklyn, New York City.
- The Mitsui Engineering & Shipbuilding company was established as the shipbuilder division of Mitsui & Co. in Tamano, Japan.
- Born: Park Chung-hee, South Korean state leader, 3rd President of South Korea; in Gumi, Korea, Empire of Japan (present-day South Korea) (d. 1979, assassinated)

== November 15, 1917 (Thursday) ==
- October Revolution – The Bolshevik government released the Declaration of the Rights of the Peoples of Russia, signed by Vladimir Lenin and Joseph Stalin, which recognized the sovereignty of all the peoples of Russia and the right to self-determination, including the right to secede.
- The Parliament of Finland passed another "Sovereignty Act", dissolving Russian sovereignty over Finland and effectively declaring the country independent.
- The Estonian Provincial Assembly declared itself the highest legal body in Estonia.
- The Australian Liberal Party led by John Bowser defeated the incumbent Australian Labor Party government led by Alexander Peacock in a general election held in Victoria, Australia.
- German flying ace Hans Ritter von Adam died when his plane was shot down by British fighter pilot Kenneth Barbour Montgomery. He had 21 victories to his credit.
- James Gunson, Mayor of Auckland, held a civic reception in the General Assembly House, the first house of the New Zealand Parliament, to mark its historical significance just prior to its demolition.
- Died:
  - Émile Durkheim, 59, French sociologist, considered of the father of sociology, author of The Rules of Sociological Method, established L'Année sociologique (b. 1858)
  - John W. Foster, 81, American public servant, 32nd United States Secretary of State (b. 1836)
  - Oswald Chambers, 43, Scottish clergy, author of My Utmost for His Highest (b. 1874)
  - Francis Morphet Twisleton, 44, New Zealand soldier and writer, recipient of the Military Cross, author of With the New Zealanders at the front (b. 1873)
  - Neil Primrose, 34, British politician, Parliamentary Secretary to the Treasury from 1916 to 1917; died from wounds sustained at the Third Battle of Gaza (b. 1882)

== November 16, 1917 (Friday) ==
- Georges Clemenceau became the 54th Prime Minister of France, and the second time in his political career.
- Sinai and Palestine campaign – British troops captured Tel Aviv and Jaffa in Palestine without resistance
- The Italian monitor ship Alfredo Cappellini capsized and sank in the Adriatic Sea.
- U.S. military air base Taylor Field was established near Montgomery, Alabama.
- The United States Army established the 186th Aero Squadron.

== November 17, 1917 (Saturday) ==
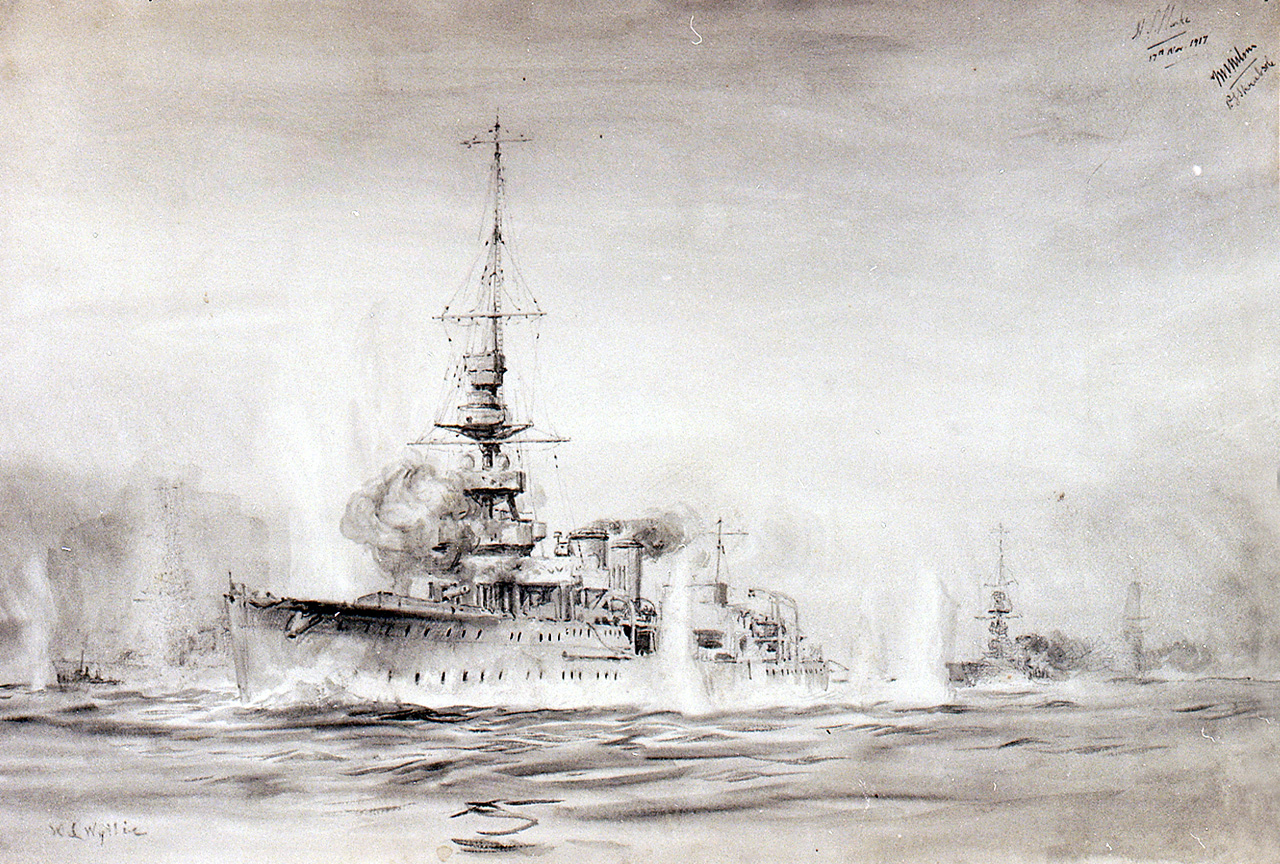
HMS Calypso during the Second Battle of Heligoland Bight, drawn by William Lionel Wyllie.

- Battle of Jerusalem – The British Imperial Egyptian Expeditionary Force launched attacks against Ottoman forces in the Judaean Mountains near Jerusalem.
- Second Battle of Heligoland Bight – After receiving a tip from intelligence, a British naval squadron ambushed and scored damages against a German naval squadron laying a minefield at Heligoland Bight in the North Sea.
- U.S. Navy destroyers USS Fanning and USS Nicholson captured and scuttled an Imperial German Navy U-boat SM U-58 off the southwest coast of Ireland, the first combat action in which U.S. ships took a submarine.
- German submarine SM UC-51 struck a mine and sank in the English Channel with all 26 crew lost.
- The People's Dispensary for Sick Animals was founded in the United Kingdom by Maria Dickin.
- Desierto de los Leones National Park was established in Mexico as the country's first national park.
- The Toronto Masonic Temple was completed with the first Lodge meeting held the following New Years Day.
- Born: Robert D. Orr, American politician, 45th Governor of Indiana; in Ann Arbor, Michigan, United States (d. 2004)
- Died:
  - Charles Holroyd, 56, English artist, director of the National Gallery from 1906 to 1916 (b. 1861)
  - Franklin P. Mall, 55, American pathologist, leading researcher into anatomy and embryology for the Johns Hopkins School of Medicine (b. 1862)
  - Auguste Rodin, 77, French sculptor, best known for his works The Thinker, The Kiss, The Gates of Hell and The Burghers of Calais, recipient of the Legion of Honour (b. 1840)

== November 18, 1917 (Sunday) ==
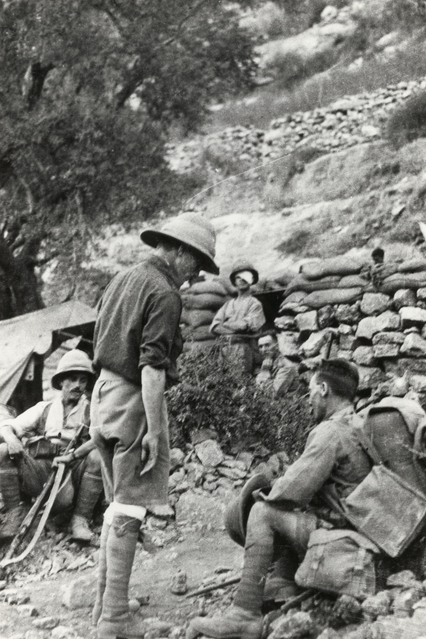
Wounded British soldiers resting during the Battle of Nebi Samwil.

- Battle of Nebi Samwil – The British 21st Corps attacked defense units of the Ottoman Seventh Army around the village of Nebi Samwil in Palestine in a simultaneous operation to capture Jerusalem. The operation began with Australian forces pushing Ottoman troops off Latrun, a strategic hilltop in the Ayalon Valley west of Jerusalem.
- A British patrol boat shelled, depth charged, rammed and sank German submarine SM UC-47 in the North Sea, killing all 26 crew.
- German submarine SM UC-57 disappeared and was believed to have struck a mine and sank in the Baltic Sea with the loss of all 26 crew.
- The Jewish high school fraternity Sigma Alpha Rho was established in West Philadelphia, Pennsylvania.
- Born:
  - Pedro Infante, Mexican actor and singer, known for lead roles during the Golden Age of Mexican cinema including Tizoc, recording artist of over 350 popular songs; in Mazatlán, Mexico (d. 1957, killed in a plane crash)
  - Carolyn Parker, American physicist, member of the Manhattan Project, first African American woman to earn postgraduate degree in physics; in Gainesville, Florida, United States (d. 1966)
- Died: Adrien Bertrand, 29, French novelist, best known for works including L'Appel du Sol and Le Verger de Cypris (b. 1888)

== November 19, 1917 (Monday) ==
- Battle of Caporetto – The 27-day battle ended with a new front along the Piave River. Casualties for the Italians were massive, including 10,000 killed, 30,000 wounded and 250,000 captured, compared to the total 70,000 casualties sustained by the Central Powers. The Corpo Aeronautico Militare (Italian Military Aviation Corps) lost a great deal of equipment but reported shooting down 39 enemy aircraft in 70 air-to-air engagements during the battle.
- Battle of Nebi Samwil – British troops of the 75th and 52nd Infantry Divisions, and the Yeomanry Mounted Division struggled through winter rain and mud through the Judaean Mountains, but reached the Palestinian towns of Beit Liqya and Beit Ur al-Tahta by the end of the day.
- The National Council of Georgia was established to pursue independence of Georgia from the dissolving Russian Empire.
- Russian General Lavr Kornilov and other military officers involved in the failed military coup on September 9 escaped imprisonment and joined General Mikhail Alekseyev in the Don Region of Russia where he took command of the anti-Bolshevik Volunteer Army.
- U.S. Navy destroyer USS Chauncey collided with a British cargo ship and sank in the Atlantic Ocean with the loss of 21 of her 91 crew including naval officers Lieutenant Commander Walter E. Reno and Junior Lieutenant Charles F. Wedderburn. U.S. Navy destroyers Reno and Wedderburn were named after them respectively.
- The United States Army established the 4th Infantry Division.
- Born: Indira Gandhi, Indian state leader, third Prime Minister of India; as Indira Nehru, in Allahabad, British India (present-day Prayagraj, India) (d. 1984, assassinated)

== November 20, 1917 (Tuesday) ==
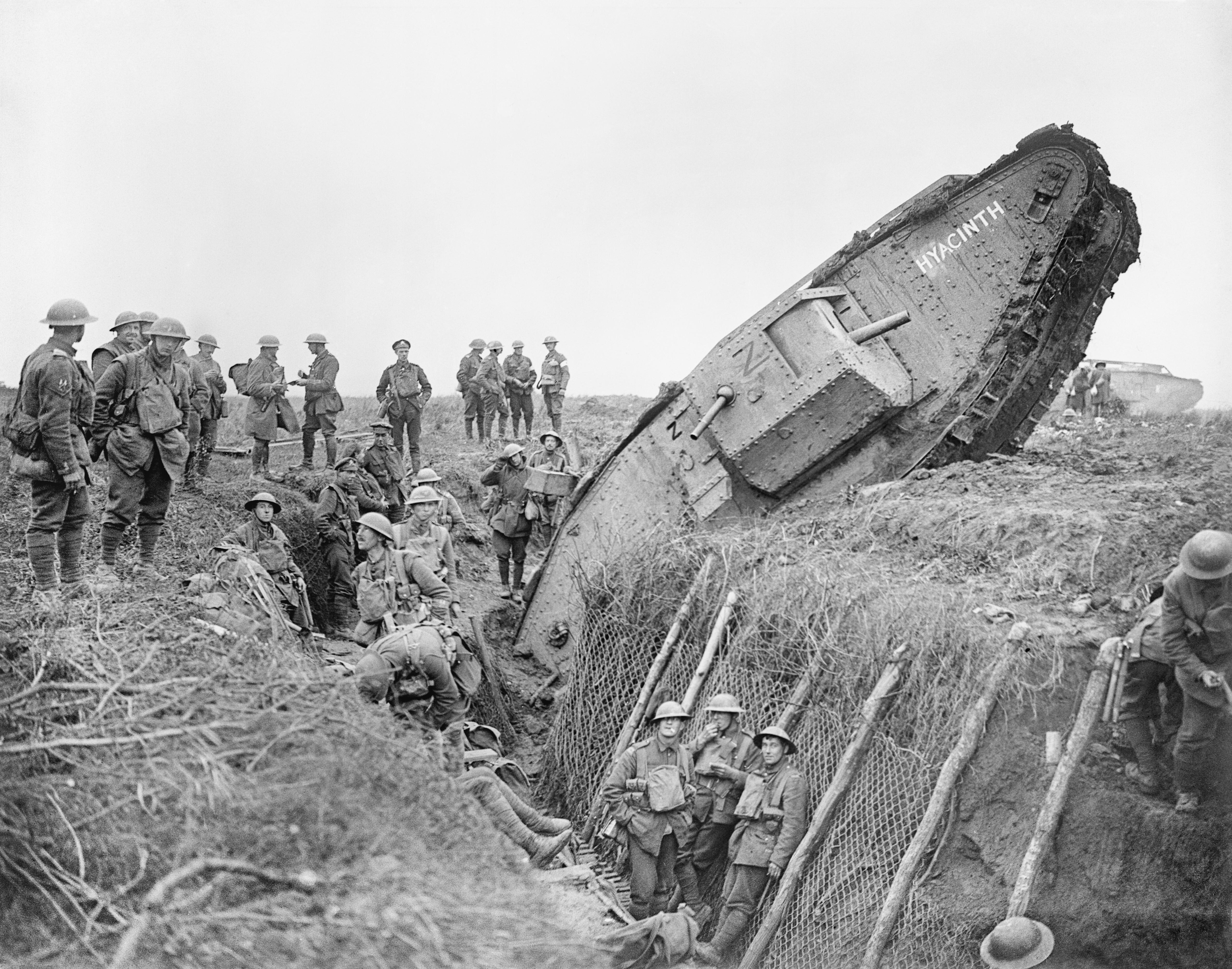
A British tank sits abandoned in a German trench at the Battle of Cambrai.

- Battle of Cambrai – The British Third Army attempted to capture Cambrai, France, from the Germans using 437 Mark IV tanks from the Royal Tank Regiment backed by infantry and innovative artillery maneuvers. The British were able to capture the village of Flesquières but suffered c. 4,000 casualties and had 179 tanks either knocked out, broken down or abandoned, most of which were salvaged by the British after the battle.
- Battle of Nebi Samwil – The British 75th Infantry Division captured the Palestinian villages of Saris and Kuryet el Enab.
- The Brazilian football club Associação Atlética Portuguesa was established in Santos, São Paulo, Brazil, and now plays in Estádio Ulrico Mursa.
- Born:
  - Robert Byrd, American politician, U.S. Senator from West Virginia from 1959 to 2010, longest serving member of the United States Senate; as Cornelius Calvin Sale Jr., in North Wilkesboro, North Carolina, United States (d. 2010)
  - Bobby Locke, South African golfer, four-time winner of The Open Championship; as Arthur D'Arcy Locke, in Germiston, Union of South Africa (present-day South Africa) (d. 1987)

== November 21, 1917 (Wednesday) ==
- Battle of Cambrai – The German Second Army halted the British advance at Bourlon Ridge.
- Battle of Nebi Samwil – A force of 3,000 Ottoman troops slowed the advance by the British 52nd Infantry Division near the village of Beit Ur el Foqa, but the 75th Infantry Division were able to take the village of Biddu near Jerusalem.
- German Zeppelin airship L 59 set a new flight endurance record while attempting a supply run to German ground forces in German East Africa. It made a 6,757-kilometer (4,196-mile) journey from Yambol, Bulgaria into Africa to a point west of Khartoum before being recalled to Yambol. The total flight time was 95 hours 5 minutes at an average speed of 71 km/h (44 mph), with enough fuel aboard to have remained in the air for another 64 hours.
- Born:
  - Dorothy Arnold, American actress, known for roles in The House of Fear and Lizzie, first wife to Joe DiMaggio; as Dorothy Arnoldine Olson, in Duluth, Minnesota, United States (d. 1984)
  - Chung Il-kwon, Korean army officer and politician, commander of the South Korean II Corps during the Korean War, Prime Minister of South Korea from 1964 to 1970; in Ussuriysk, Russian Republic (present-day Russia) (d. 1994)

== November 22, 1917 (Thursday) ==
- Battle of Nebi Samwil – British and Ottoman forces engaged in fierce fighting at the village of El Jib, Palestine, with the British toll at 2,000 casualties.
- The National Hockey Association suspended operations.
- Born:
  - Andrew Huxley, English medical researcher, recipient of the Nobel Prize in Physiology or Medicine for his research on the nervous system, member of the Huxley family; in Hampstead, London, England (d. 2012)
  - Jon Cleary, Australian writer, author of The Sundowners and the Scobie Malone detective series; in Erskineville, New South Wales, Australia (d. 2010)
  - Bridget Bate Tichenor, French-Mexican artist, noted for her work in magic realism in such works as Domadora de quimeras and Los encarcelados; as Bridget Pamela Arkwright Bate, in Paris, France (d. 1990)
- Died: Teoberto Maler, 75, German archaeologist, leading researcher into the Maya civilization (b. 1842)

== November 23, 1917 (Friday) ==
- Battle of Cambrai – The British 40th Division attacked Bourlon Ridge using 100 tanks and 430 guns but failed to capture the German defensive position and suffered another 4,000 casualties.
- October Revolution – The Bolsheviks released the full text of the previously secret Sykes–Picot Agreement of 1916 in Izvestia and Pravda.
- Born: William Paul Fife, American air force officer, innovator of signals technology for the United States Air Force; in Plymouth, Indiana, United States (d. 2008)
- Died:
  - James Hamilton Peabody, 65, American politician, 13th and 15th Governor of Colorado (b. 1852)
  - Ewart Alan Mackintosh, 24, Scottish poet, known for poetry collections including A Highland Regiment and Other Poems; killed in action during the Battle of Cambrai (b. 1893)

== November 24, 1917 (Saturday) ==
- Battle of Jerusalem – The New Zealand Mounted Rifles Brigade crossed the Nahr el Auja River north of Jaffa to establish beachheads for the main British force.
- Battle of Nebi Samwil – Fighting stalled after three days but British 21st Corps were able to hold onto the village of Nebi Samwil for two weeks of Ottoman counterattacks.
- German submarine SM U-48 was scuttled and abandoned after damaged by Royal Navy destroyer HMS Gipsy in the English Channel. The British vessel continued firing on the fleeing crew, killing 19. Another 17 were taken prisoner.
- Nine members of the Milwaukee Police Department plus a civilian were killed by a bomb, the most deaths in a single event in U.S. police history until the September 11 attacks in 2001.
- Born:
  - Shabtai Rosenne, British-Israeli diplomat and judge, best known expert on treaty law for the United Nations; as Sefton Wilfred David Rowson, in London, England (d. 2010)
  - Neville McGarr, South African air force officer, member of the escape group from Stalag Luft III; as Clement Aldwyn Neville McGarr, in Johannesburg, Union of South Africa (present-day South Africa) (d. 1944, executed)

== November 25, 1917 (Sunday) ==
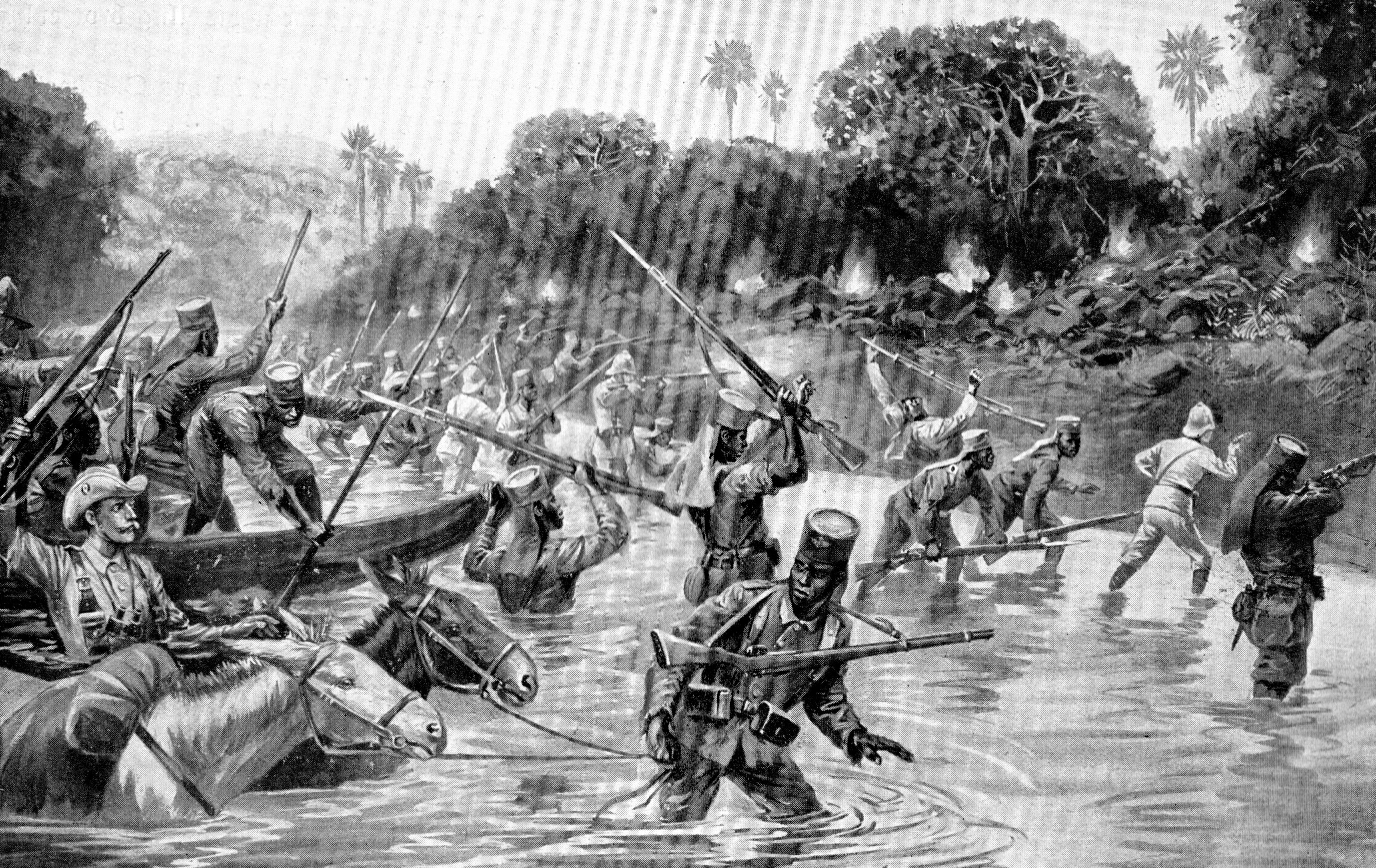
German soldiers clashing with Portuguese troops at the Battle of Ngomano.

- The Russian Constituent Assembly elections were held, the first free elections ever held in Russia, with the Socialist Revolutionary Party receiving the most votes followed by the Bolsheviks.
- A constitutional referendum was held in Uruguay, with voters overwhelmingly approving the formation of a new National Council of Administration.
- Battle of Jerusalem – Ottoman forces pushed British troops back across the Nahr el Auja River.
- Battle of Ngomano – German forces defeated a Portuguese colonial force of about 1,200 soldiers at Ngomano in Portuguese Mozambique (now Mozambique and Tanzania).
- The Luftstreitkräfte established air squadron Jagdstaffel 77.
- The Brazilian football club América was established in Vitória, Espírito Santo, Brazil. Although it was a successful club that won the Campeonato Capixaba title six times, it eventually folded.
- Born:
  - Noboru Terada, Japanese swimmer, gold medalist for the 1936 Summer Olympics; in Shizuoka Prefecture, Empire of Japan (present-day Japan) (d. 1986)
  - Stanley Wilson, American composer, best known for his film and television scores including Alfred Hitchcock Presents, Leave It to Beaver, and McHale's Navy; in New York City, United States (d. 1970)

== November 26, 1917 (Monday) ==
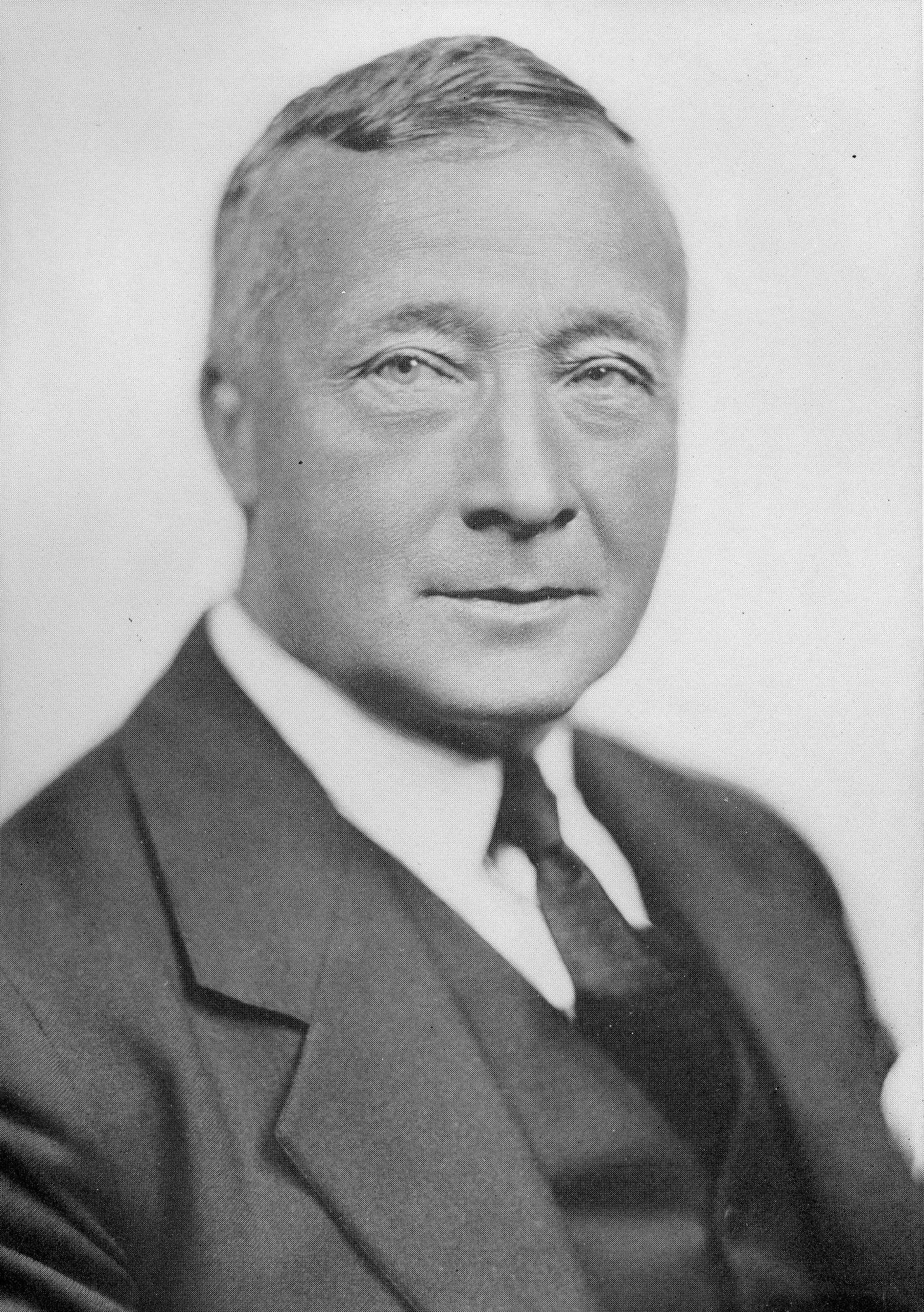
Frank Calder, first President of the National Hockey League.

- First Battle of Monte Grappa – Austrian and German forces failed to capture Monte Grappa from the Italians, thus stabilizing the new Italian front. Casualties for the Central Powers totaled 21,000 while the Italians suffered 12,000 casualties.
- The Sykes–Picot Agreement of 1916 was reprinted in The Guardian.
- Australian Prime Minister Billy Hughes ordered government troops to stage a raid on the Queensland Government Printing Office in Brisbane and confiscate copies of Hansard that covered debates in the Parliament of Queensland where anti-conscription arguments were aired.
- The United States Army established the 6th Infantry Division.
- The National Hockey League was formed in Montreal as a replacement for the recently disbanded National Hockey Association, with Frank Calder as its first president. The league was intended to be a temporary organization since the NHA did not have the legal power to remove Toronto hockey club owner Eddie Livingstone. The NHL contained the four original teams from the NHA plus the Toronto Arenas to round the league out to five teams.
- The Moutohora Branch of the New Zealand national rail network opened between Moutohora and Gisborne, New Zealand.
- The Western The Silent Man, directed by and starring William S. Hart, was released by Paramount Pictures.
- Died:
  - Elsie Inglis, 53, Scottish physician, founder of Scottish Women's Hospitals for Foreign Service (b. 1864)
  - Leander Starr Jameson, 64, British politician, led the Jameson Raid of 1895 to 1896 in South Africa (b. 1853)

== November 27, 1917 (Tuesday) ==
- Battle of Cambrai – The British 62nd Division made one last push to take Bourlon Ridge using 30 tanks but were forced back by a German counterattack.
- Battle of Jerusalem – Ottoman forces launched a wave of counterattacks against the British in an attempt to break the line at Beit Ur el Tahta, Palestine.
- All members of the suffragist group Silent Sentinels, including leader Alice Paul, were released from prison after reports of abuse were released through the news media. In March 1918, the DC Court of Appeals ruled all arrests, trials and punishments the women endured were unconstitutional.
- Born:
  - Yosef Qafih, Israeli religious scholar, translator of early rabbinic texts from Maimonides and Saadia Gaon; in Sanaa, Ottoman Empire (present-day Yemen) (d. 2000)
  - Buffalo Bob Smith, American radio and television broadcaster, host of the 1950s children's television show Howdy Doody; as Robert Emil Schmidt, in Buffalo, New York, United States (d. 1998)

== November 28, 1917 (Wednesday) ==
- The Estonian Provincial Assembly declared Estonia a sovereign power from Russia and called for elections of a new Estonian Constituent Assembly.
- Bashkortostan established itself as the first Autonomous Soviet Republic within the Russian Soviet Federative Socialist Republic.
- Battle of Cambrai – British forces dug in and shelled German defenses in Bourlon Wood.
- Battle of Jerusalem – Ottoman forces forced the British out of the village of Beit Ur el Foqa.
- British armed passenger ship SS Apapa was torpedoed and sunk in the Irish Sea by German submarine SM U-96 with the loss of 77 lives.
- The All-Russian Council for Workers' Control held its first and likely only meeting determining the extent to which workers' control became a feature in post-revolutionary Russia.
- The Naval Aircraft Factory in Philadelphia opened for operations, just 110 days after construction began.
- The only Jewish cemetery in Uruguay, the Cementerio Israelita, was opened in La Paz, Uruguay.
- Born: Marni Hodgkin, American book editor, children's book editor for Viking Press and Macmillan Publishers, married to British medical researcher Alan Hodgkin; as Marion Rous, in New York City, United States (d. 2015)

== November 29, 1917 (Thursday) ==
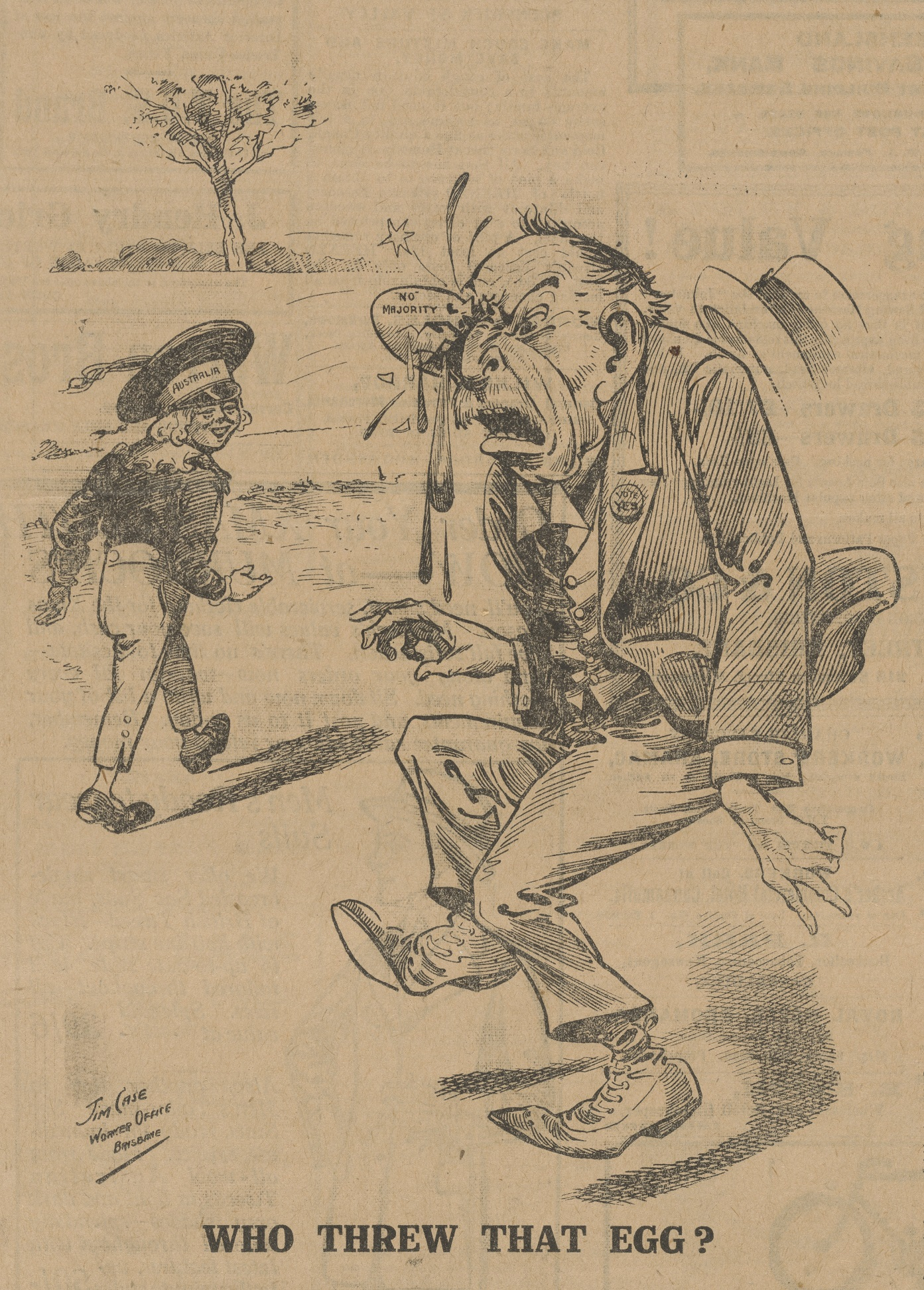
Political cartoon depicting Australian prime minister Billy Hughes being hit by an egg.

- German submarine SM UB-61 struck a mine and sank in the North Sea with a loss of all 34 crew.
- Queensland Police Service refused to arrest a man who threw an egg at Australian Prime Minister Billy Hughes while visiting Warwick, Queensland, in what became known as the "Egg Throwing Incident". Fallout from the event led to the formation of the Commonwealth Police Force.
- German flying ace Erwin Böhme, a member of the Jagdstaffel 11 air squadron commanded by Manfred von Richthofen, was killed in action during a reconnaissance mission over Zonnebeke, Belgium. He received a Pour le Mérite medal decoration posthumously for his service.
- The Daily Telegraph published the Lansdowne letter, written by House of Lords member Henry Petty-Fitzmaurice, which called on the United Kingdom to negotiate a peace agreement with Germany as the war's "prolongation will spell ruin for the civilised world."
- The National Library of Vietnam was established.
- The Women's Royal Naval Service was established.
- Born:
  - Merle Travis, American country singer, best known for his coal mining songs "Sixteen Tons" and "Dark as a Dungeon"; in Rosewood, Kentucky, United States (d. 1983)
  - Hou Baolin, Chinese comedian, leading xiangsheng performer in China; in Tianjin, Republic of China (present-day China) (d. 1993)

== November 30, 1917 (Friday) ==
- Battle of Cambrai – German forces counterattacked from the village of Bourlon along a 13 km (8 mi) line and nearly captured two British divisions.
- Pope Benedict released a motu proprio (signed personal document) that dissolved the "Affairs of the Oriental Rite" of the Congregation for the Evangelization of Peoples in light of the newly established Congregation for the Oriental Churches.
- The Vickers Vimy aircraft was first flown.
- Swanson Bay, British Columbia recorded 88.01 inches (2,235.5 mm) of precipitation for the month of November, which remains the highest officially recorded for one calendar month in North America.
- Indian physicist and biologist Jagadish Chandra Bose established the Bose Institute in Calcutta, the first and oldest research institute in India.
- Born: Bill Ash, American-born British air force officer, known for his escapes from German POW camps Stalag Luft III and VI during World War II; as William Franklin Ash, in Dallas, United States (d. 2014)
- Died:
  - José Joaquín Rodríguez Zeledón, 80, Costa Rican state leader, 15th President of Costa Rica (b. 1837)
  - William E. Chandler, 81, American public servant, 13th United States Secretary of the Navy (b. 1835)
  - Adolphe Lechaptois, 65, French clergy, member of the White Fathers order and vicar of the Apostolic Vicariate of Tanganyika (now Tanzania) from 1891 to 1917 (b. 1852)
