= Desperate Man =

(The) Desperate Man may refer to:

- Desperate Man (album), by Eric Church
  - "Desperate Man" (song), the title track
- The Desperate Man (film), a 1959 British B movie crime film
- The Desperate Man (novel), a French novel by Léon Bloy
- "A Desperate Man", an episode of American crime drama series NCIS
- Le Désespéré, also known as The Desperate Man in English, a self-portrait by Gustave Courbet
