= Lord Southborough =

Lord Southborough may refer to:

- RNLB Lord Southborough (Civil Service No. 1) (ON 688), a British lifeboat
- Francis Hopwood, 1st Baron Southborough (1860–1947), British civil servant, namesake of the lifeboat

== See also ==
- Baron Southborough
