= Feldmarshalskaya massacre =

- Location: North Caucasus
- Date: December 1918 - December 1920
- Target: Russians, Cossacks
- Attack type: Deportation, looting,
- Deaths: 35,000 - 38,000
- Victims: 25,000 deported
- Perpetrators: Chechens; Ingush; Supported by: Bolsheviks
- Motive: Anti-Russian sentiment Vaynakh Nationalism

The Feldmarshalovskaya Massacre also referred to as The Deportation of the Terek Cossacks was an armed attack carried out by Ingush and Chechen detachments on the Cossack Village of Feldmarshalovskaya and the Sunzhenksaya line during the Russian Civil War. The event took place amid the chaos and weakening of central authority, marked by ethnic tensions, struggles for resources, and territorial redivision in the North Caucasus. The raid reflected the strained relations between the local Cossack population and the highlanders, exacerbated by political instability and interethnic hostility.

It took place in the second half of November 1917, after one of the most terrible clashes on the Sunzhenskaya line. The village of Feldmarshalskaya was plundered and burned.

== Raid ==
After the October Revolution, a mountain government and a Cossack government formed on 30 January 1918. The Ossetians destroyed the Vladikavkaz Soviet of Workers' Deputies. "The first robberies began at the bazaar when the Ingush arrived at the bazaar in Vladikavkaz and continued until 05.01.1918", on 7 January 1918, Khizir Ortskhanov and Hadji Mullah broke into the city with their troops. a clash between the Ingush and the Cossacks occurred near the village of Feldmarshalskaya.

In alliance with the Chechens, the Ingush people began to displace the Cossack villages and massacre the russian cossacks of the Sunzhenskaya line in November 1918.
