= Agricultural Research Council =

The Agricultural Research Council (ARC) was established in the United Kingdom in 1931 as a more comprehensive body than the Advisory Committee on Agricultural Research to the Development Commissioners which preceded it and whose functions it took over. It was established as a committee of the Privy Council for the "for the organisation and development of agricultural research." This was then transformed into the ARC by Royal Charter with thirteen original members:

- Dr. Joseph Arthur Arkwright, F.K.S., M.A., F.R.C.P.
- Sir Merrik Burrell, Bt., C.B.E.
- Dr. Edwin John Butler, C.I.E., F.R.S.
- Professor Edward Provan Cathcart, C.B.E., M.D., D.Sc, F.R.S.
- Right Hon. Lord Richard Cavendish, C.B., C.M.G.
- Mr. Joseph F. Duncan, trade unionist
- Sir John Bretland Farmer, M.A., D.Sc., LL.D., F.R.S.
- Sir Alfred Daniel Hall, K.C.B., LL.D., F.R.S.
- Sir Frederick Gowland Hopkins, M.A., M.B., D.Sc, LL.D., F.R.C.P., F.R.S.
- Professor Thomas J. Mackie
- Sir Thomas Middleton, K.C.I.E., K.B.E., C.B.
- Mr. James William Spencer Mount
- Professor D. M. S. Watson, F.R.S.

In 1983 it was superseded by the Agricultural and Food Research Council.
