= Agricultural and Food Research Council =

- Abbreviation: AFRC
- Formation: 1983
- Purpose: Funding of UK agriculture and horticulture
- Region served: United Kingdom

The Agricultural and Food Research Council (AFRC) was a British Research Council responsible for funding and managing scientific and technological developments in farming and horticulture.

== History ==
The AFRC was formed in 1983 from its predecessor, the Agricultural Research Council (ARC). It was replaced by the Biotechnology and Biological Sciences Research Council (BBSRC) as a result of government reorganisation in 1994. At that time, Sir William Henderson who was secretary to the AFRC claimed that "agriculture was a success story" hence the AFRC could be closed and a new vision for research was envisaged in the creation of the BBSRC. With this shift in emphasis, there also followed the closure of several educational and research organisations as for example the internationally renowned Wye College.
