= Disagreeable Tales =

Short story collection by Léon Bloy

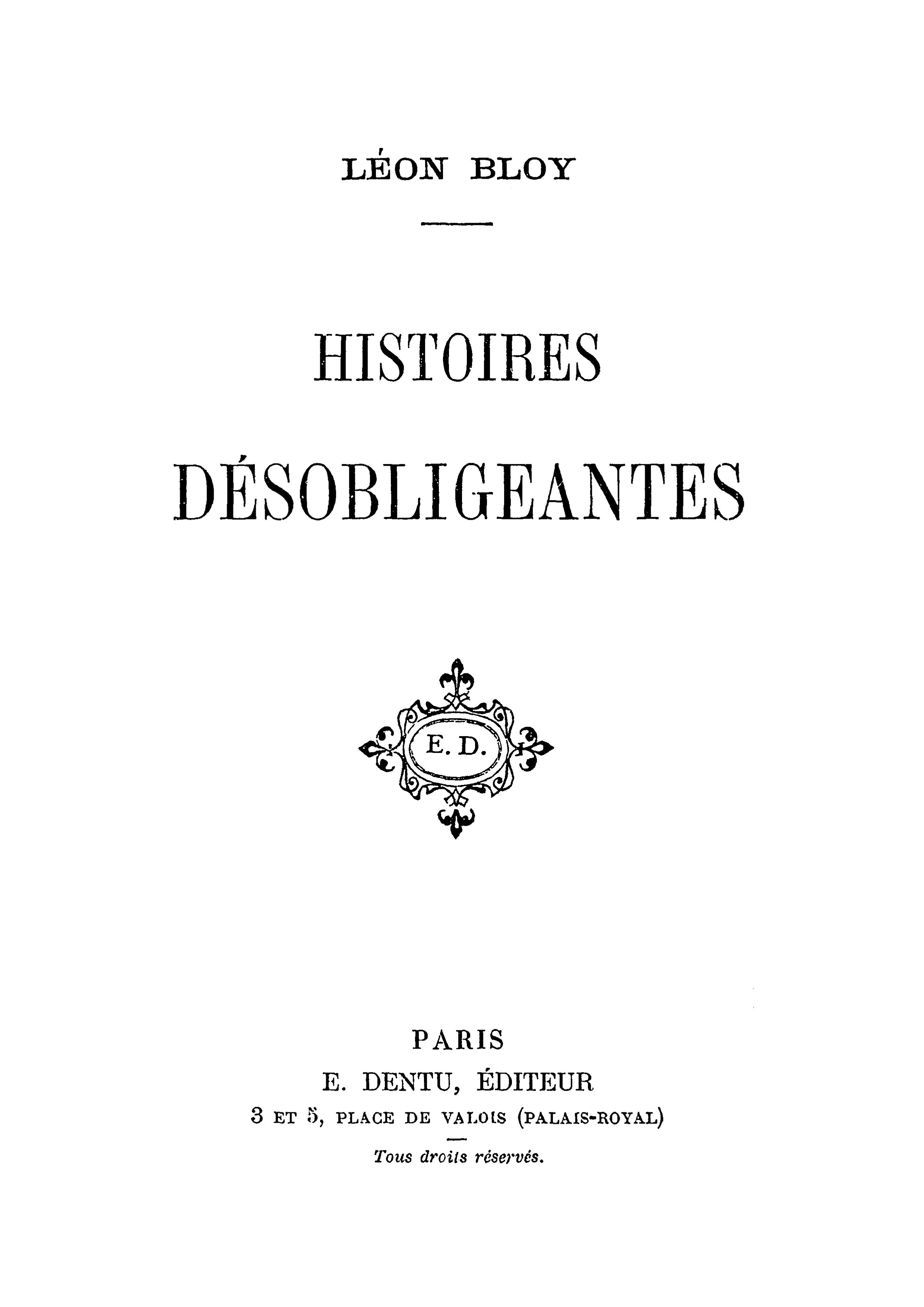
- Title page
- Author: Léon Bloy
- Original title: Histoires désobligeantes
- Translator: Erik Butler
- Language: French
- Publisher: Dentu
- Publication date: 1894
- Publication place: France
- English publication date: 2015
- Pages: 369

Disagreeable Tales (French: Histoires désobligeantes) is an 1894 short story collection by the French writer Léon Bloy. It consists of thirty tales set in Paris, focusing on criminality, perversions, and other subject matters typical of the Decadent movement. The common theme is the faith in God in a time of human spiritual crisis.

The book is dedicated "To my dear friend Eugène Borrel, in devout remembrance of Our Lady of Ephesus, who places us so far away from contemporary garbage."

== Stories ==
The English titles listed here are from the Wakefield Press edition. An edition held by the Bibliothèque nationale appears to contain two additional stories, "L'appel du Gouffre" and "L'Ami des Bêtes", though they are in fact excerpts from Bloy's novel The Woman Who Was Poor. Both pieces appear in the Snuggly Books edition.

Nearly all the stories in Histoires désobligeantes were originally published in Gil Blas; the date given after the French title refers to the issue in which the work first appeared.

1. "Herbal Tea" ("La Tisane")
2. "The Old Man of the House" ("Le Vieux de la Maison," 29 July 1893)
3. "The Religion of Monsieur Pleur" ("La Religion de Monsieur Pleur")
4. "The Parlor of Tarantulas" ("Le Parloir des Tarentules," 12 August 1893)
5. "Draft for a Funeral Oration" ("Projet d'Oraison funèbre," 25 August 1893)
6. "The Prisoners of Longjumeau" ("Les Captifs de Longjumeau")
7. "A Lousy Idea" ("Une Idée médiocre," 8 September 1893) Four young men decide to live together, but when one of them marries, the other three continually harangue him for intimate details of his relations with his new wife (whom they also harass), until she is finally driven into the arms of a lover and makes her escape.
8. "Two Ghosts" ("Deux Fantômes," 15 September 1893)
9. "A Dentist's Terrible Punishment" ("Terrible Châtiment d'un Dentiste," 22 September 1893) A dentist murders a love rival, but after marrying the woman he killed for, he fathers a child with her only to discover that it resembles his victim, and so he strangles the baby.
10. "The Awakening of Alain Chartier" ("Le Réveil d'Alain Chartier")
11. "The Stroker of Compassion" ("Le frôleur compatissant," 6 October 1893)
12. "Monsieur's Past" ("Le Passé du Monsieur")
13. "Whatever You Want!" ("Tout ce que tu voudras!", 27 October 1893) Making his way home after a night of pleasure, a man encounters a prostitute who may be his sister.
14. "Well-Done" ("La dernière cuite", 3 November 1893) The son of a retired, well-to-do coffin bleacher ends up accidentally cremating his father before he is dead.
15. "The End of Don Juan" ("La Fin de don Juan") During the reign of Louis Philippe, the handsome Hector de la Tour de Pise sires hideously misshapen children, and in his old age licks the feet of a prostitute.
16. "A Martyr" ("Une Martyre")
17. "Suspicion" ("Le Soupçon")
18. "The Telephone of Calypso" ("Le Téléphone de Calypso," 22 December 1893)
19. "A Recruit" ("Une Recrue")
20. "Botched Sacrilege" ("Sacrilège raté")
21. "It's Gonna Blow!" ("Le Torchon brûle!" 5 January 1894) A discussion about the forgivableness of the human soul degenerates into a confession of murder and arson.
22. "The Silver Lining" ("La Taie d'argent")
23. "A Well-Fed Man" ("Un homme bien nourri")
24. "The Lucky Bean" ("La Fève")
25. "Digestive Aids" ("Propos digestifs")
26. "The Reading Room" ("Le Cabinet de lecture")
27. "Nobody's Perfect" ("On n'est pas parfait")
28. "Let's Be Reasonable!" ("Soyons raisonnables," 23 February 1893)
29. "Jocasta on the Streets" ("Jocaste sur le trottoir," 16 March 1894)
30. "Cain's Luckiest Fine" ("La plus belle Trouvaille de Caïn")

== English translations ==
Histoires Désobligeantes has been translated into English twice, first by Erik Butler for Wakefield Press in 2015, and then by Brian Stableford, with an introduction and footnotes, as The Tarantula's Parlor and Other Unkind Tales for Snuggly Books in 2016.

== Reception ==
Erik Morse wrote for The Paris Review in 2015, "What distinguishes Bloy's 'tales' from those written by Villiers de L'Isle-Adam, Poe, and Lautréamont is the marked absence of any sensualist or proto-surrealist tone with its ecstatic invocations of the flesh, like those that characterize Romantic literature since William Blake. Rather, Bloy's bilious allusions to excrement ('ordure'), genitalia, rot, disease, and waste descend from a negative theology, which extols a mystical, self-mortification[.] ... For Bloy, all physical pleasures are diversion or, worst yet, satanic temptation, so it is only through intense suffering and punishment that his characters can expiate their sins."

The Complete Review and The Pan Review both praise Butler's translation.
