= Léon Bloy =

French poet, essayist and satirist (1846–1917)

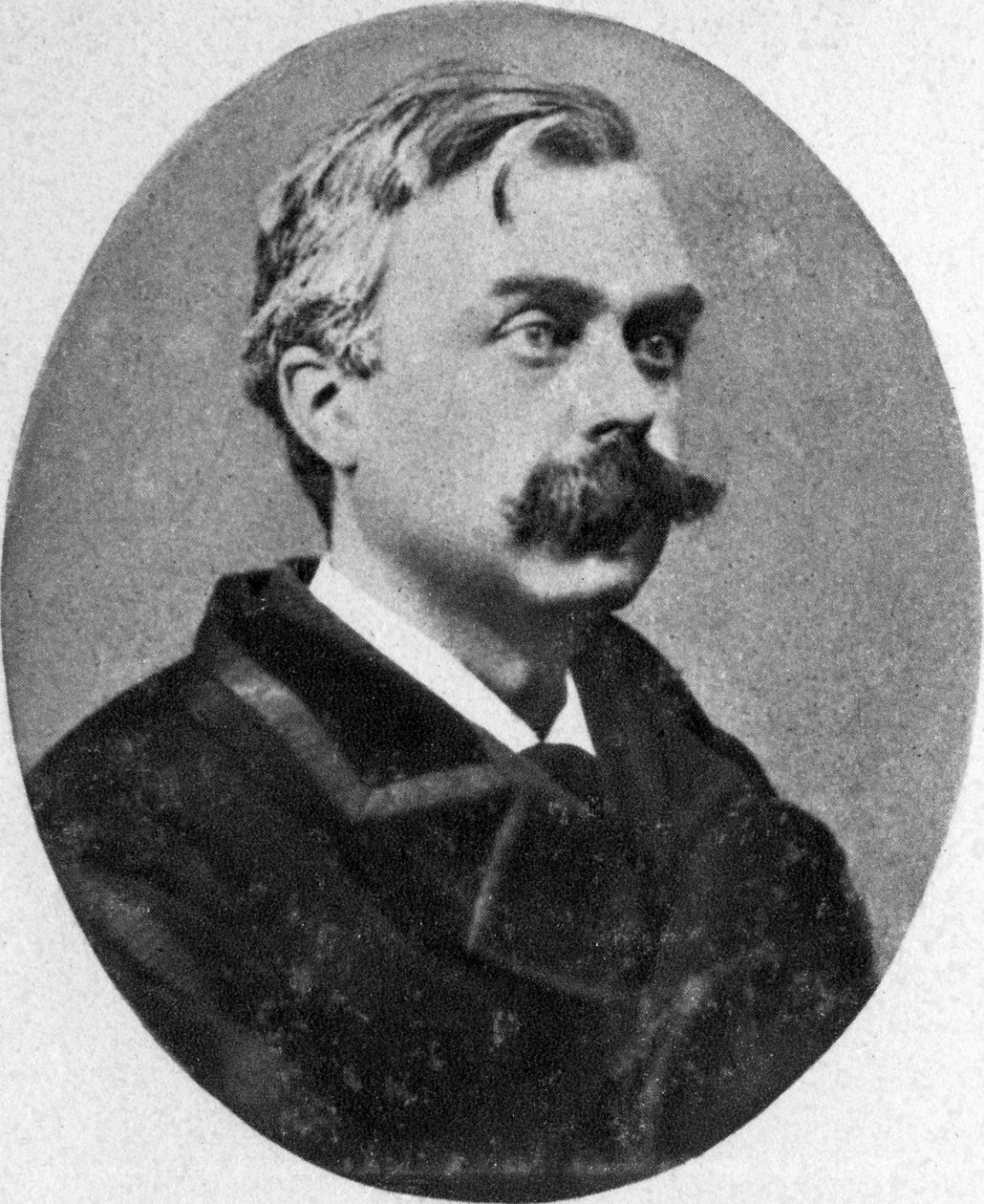
- Bloy in 1887
- Born: 11 July 1846; Notre-Dame-de-Sanilhac, Kingdom of France
- Died: 3 November 1917 (aged 71); Bourg-la-Reine, French Republic
- Occupations: Novelist; essayist; poet

Léon Bloy (French pronunciation: [leɔ̃ blwa]; 11 July 1846 – 3 November 1917) was a French Catholic novelist, essayist, pamphleteer (or lampoonist), and satirist, known additionally for his eventual and passionate defense of Catholicism and for his influence within French Catholic circles.

== Biography ==
Bloy was born on 11 July 1846 in Notre-Dame-de-Sanilhac, in the arondissement of Périgueux, Dordogne. He was the second of six sons of Jean-Baptiste Bloy, a Voltairean freethinker, and Anne-Marie Carreau, a stern disciplinarian and pious Spanish-Catholic daughter of a Napoleonic soldier. After an agnostic and unhappy youth in which he cultivated an intense hatred for the Catholic Church and its teaching, his father found him a job in Paris, where he went in 1864. In December 1868, he met the aging Catholic author Barbey d'Aurevilly, who lived opposite him in rue Rousselet and who became his mentor. Shortly afterwards, he underwent a dramatic religious conversion and was received into the Catholic Church.

Bloy was a friend of the author Joris-Karl Huysmans, the painter Georges Rouault, the philosophers Jacques and Raïssa Maritain and was instrumental in reconciling these intellectuals with Catholicism. However, he acquired a reputation for bigotry because of his frequent outbursts of temper. For example, in 1885, after the death of Victor Hugo, whom Bloy believed to be an atheist, Bloy decried Hugo's "senility," "avarice," and "hypocrisy," identifying Hugo among "contemplatives of biological scum." Bloy's first novel, Le Désespéré, a critique of rationalism and those he believed to be in league with it, made him fall out with the literary community of his time and even many of his old friends. Soon, Bloy could count such prestigious authors as Émile Zola, Guy de Maupassant, Ernest Renan, and Anatole France as his enemies.

Bloy was noted for personal attacks, but he saw them as the mercy or indignation of God. According to Jacques Maritain, he used to say: "My anger is the effervescence of my pity." Among the many targets of Bloy's attacks were people of business. In an essay in Pilgrim of the Absolute, he compared the businessmen of Chicago unfavourably to the cultured people of Paris:

"In Paris you have the Saint Chapelle and the Louvre, true enough, but we in Chicago kill eighty thousand hogs a day!..." The man who says that is in truth a business man.

— Léon Bloy, "Les Affaires Sont Les Affaires" ("Business Is Business") in "The Wisdom of the Bourgeois", part of Pilgrim of the Absolute.

In addition to his published works, he left a large body of correspondence with public and literary figures. He died on 3 November 1917 in Bourg-la-Reine.

== Our Lady of La Salette ==
Inspired by both the millennialist visionary Eugène Vintras and the reports of an apparition at La Salette—Our Lady of La Salette—Bloy was convinced that the Virgin's message was that if people did not reform, the end time was imminent. He was particularly critical of the attention paid to the shrine at Lourdes and resented the fact that it distracted people from what he saw as the less sentimental message of La Salette.

== Influence ==
Argentinian writer Jorge Luis Borges named Bloy in the foreword to his short story collection Artificios (later part of the anthology Ficciones) as one of seven in "the heterogeneous list of writers I am constantly re-reading", further acknowledging his influence in the story "Three Versions of Judas" (1944). Borges further mentions Bloy in his essay "Kafka and his Precursors" (1951) as an example of an author who wrote Kafkaesque texts prior to the writings of Franz Kafka, noting a short story from Histoires désobligeantes about "some people who amass globes, atlases, train schedules, and trunks, and who die without ever having left the town where they were born." Borges's essay "The Mirror of Enigmas" (1952) also largely concerns Léon Bloy. In it, Borges tracks down the recurring appearance of phrases inspired by I Corinthians 13:12 ("for now we see through a glass, darkly" in the KJV translation) throughout Bloy's oeuvre.

Bloy is quoted in the epigraph at the beginning of Graham Greene's novel The End of the Affair (1951), though Greene claimed that "this irate man lacked creative instinct" in reference to Bloy.

In his novel The Harp and the Shadow (1979), Alejo Carpentier excoriates Bloy as a raving, Columbus-defending lunatic during Vatican deliberations over the explorer's canonization. Bloy is also quoted at the beginning of John Irving's A Prayer for Owen Meany, and there are several quotations from his Letters to my Fiancée in Charles Williams's anthology The New Christian Year. Le Désespéré was republished in 2005 by Éditions Underbahn with a preface by Maurice G. Dantec. The historian Jaime Eyzaguirre came to be influenced by Bloy's writings.

According to the historian John Connelly, Bloy's Le Salut par les Juifs, with its apocalyptically radical interpretation of chapters 9 to 11 of Paul's Letter to the Romans, had a major influence on the Catholic theologians of the Second Vatican Council responsible for section 4 of the council's declaration Nostra aetate (1965), the doctrinal basis for a revolutionary change in the Catholic Church's attitude to Judaism.

In 2013, Pope Francis surprised many by quoting Bloy during his first homily as pope: "When one does not confess Jesus Christ, I am reminded of the expression of Léon Bloy: 'He who does not pray to the Lord prays to the devil.' When one does not confess Jesus Christ, one confesses the worldliness of the devil."

Bloy and his effect on 21st-century French scholars make a significant appearance in Michel Houellebecq's novel Submission (2015).

== Works ==
=== Novels ===
- Le Désespéré (1887) (The Desperate Man translated into English by Richard Robinson. Sunny Lou Publishing, ISBN 978-1-95539-237-2, 2023)
- La Femme pauvre (1897) (The Woman Who Was Poor translated into English by I. J. Collins. St. Augustines Press, ISBN 978-1-89031-892-5, 2015)

=== Essays ===
- "Le Révélateur du Globe: Christophe Colomb & Sa Béatification Future" (1884) (In English translation: "The Revealer of the Globe: Christopher Columbus and His Future Beatification" (Part One). Sunny Lou Publishing, ISBN 978-1-95539-205-1, 2021)
- "Propos d'un entrepreneur de démolitions" (1884) ("Words of a Demolitions Contractor" translated into English by Richard Robinson. Sunny Lou Publishing Company, ISBN 978-1-73547-763-3, 2020)
- "Un Brelan d'excommuniés" (1889)
- "Le Salut par les Juifs" (1892) ("Salvation through the Jews" translated into English by Richard Robinson. Sunny Lou Publishing Company, ISBN 978-1-73547-762-6, 2020)
- "Léon Bloy devant les cochons" (1894)
- "Ici on assassine les grands hommes" (1895) ("Great Men Are Slain Here," in English translation by Sunny Lou Publishing, ISBN 978-1-95539-275-4, 2025)
- "Je m'accuse" (1900) ("I accuse myself"), in response to Émile Zola's 1898 open letter J'Accuse…! (Je M'Accuse... translated into English by Richard Robinson. Sunny Lou Publishing Company, ISBN 978-0-57872-982-4, 2020)
- "Le Fils de Louis XVI" (1900) ("The Son of Louis XVI", in English translation. Sunny Lou Publishing ISBN 978-1-95539-222-8, 2022)
- "Exégèse des lieux communs" (1902–12) ("Exegesis of the Commonplaces", translated into English by Louis Cancelmi. Wiseblood Books ISBN 978-1-95131-991-5, 2021)
- "Belluaires et porchers" (1905) ("Gladiators and swineherds")
- "Le Résurrection de Villiers de lʼIsle-Adam" (1906) ("The Resurrection of Villiers de l'Isle-Adam", in English translation. Sunny Lou Publishing, ISBN 978-1-95539-224-2, 2022)
- "L'épopée byzantine et Gustave Schlumberger" (1906)
- "Celle qui pleure" (1908) ("She Who Weeps", in English translation and published by Sunny Lou Publishing, ISBN 978-1-95539-212-9, 2021)
- "Le Sang du Pauvre" (1909) ("Blood of the Poor", translated into English, and published by Sunny Lou Publishing, ISBN 978-1-95539-201-3, 2021)
- "L'Ame de Napoléon" (1912) ("The Soul of Napoleon."
  - Éditions Jérôme Millon, 2021. 192p. ISBN 9782841373918.
  - In English translation: Sunny Lou Publishing Company, ISBN 978-1-95539-200-6, 2021)
- "Sur la Tombe de Huysmans" (1913) (In English translation: On Huysmans' Tomb: Critical reviews of J.-K. Huysmans and À Rebours, En Rade, and Là-Bas. Sunny Lou Publishing Company, 2021)
- "Jeanne d'Arc et l'Allemagne" (1915) ("Joan of Arc and Germany."
  - Éditions Jérôme Millon, 2016. 176p. ISBN 9782841373246.
  - In English translation: Sunny Lou Publishing Company, ISBN 978-1-95539-206-8, 2021)
- "Constantinople et Byzance" (1917) ("Constantinople and Byzantium."
  - Éditions Jérôme Millon, 2025. 176p. ISBN 9782841374335.
  - In English translation: Sunny Lou Publishing Company, ISBN 978-1-95539-231-0, 2022)

=== Short stories ===
- Sueur de sang (1893) ("Sweating blood" In English translation: Wakefield Press, ISBN 978-1-93966-317-7, 2016)
- Histoires désobligeantes (1894) (Disagreeable tales)

=== Diaries ===
- Le Mendiant ingrat (1898) ("The Ungrateful Beggar," Sunny Lou Publishing, ISBN 978-1-95539-274-7, 2025.)
- Mon Journal (1904) ("My Journal: 1896-1900," Sunny Lou Publishing, ISBN 978-1-955392-86-0, 2026.)
- Quatre ans de captivité à Cochons-sur-Marne (1905) ("Four Years of Captivity in Cochons-sur-Marne: 1900-1904," Sunny Lou Publishing, ISBN 978-1-95539-234-1, 2022.)
- L'Invendable (1909) ("The Unsaleable")
- Le Vieux de la montagne (1911) ("The Old Man from the Mountain")
- Le Pèlerin de l'Absolu (1914) ("The Pilgrim of the Absolute", edited by David Bentley Hart. Cluny Media, LLC, ISBN 978-1-94441-847-2, 2017)
- Au seuil de l'Apocalypse (1916) ("On the Threshold of the Apocalypse." In English translation: Sunny Lou Publishing Company, ISBN 978-1-95539-211-2, 2021.)
- Méditations d'un solitaire en 1916 (1917) ("Meditations of a Solitary in 1916," Sunny Lou Publishing Company, ISBN 978-1-95539-238-9, 2023.)
- La Porte des humbles (posth., 1920) ("The Door of the Lowly")

A study in English is Léon Bloy by Rayner Heppenstall (Cambridge: Bowes & Bowes, 1953).

=== Quotations ===
- "Love does not make you weak, because it is the source of all strength, but it makes you see the nothingness of the illusory strength on which you depended before you knew it."
- "There is only one tragedy in the end, not to have been a saint."
- "But I love Paris, which is the place of intelligence, and I feel Paris threatened by this truly tragic lampstand sprouting from its belly, which will be visible at night from twenty leagues away ..."
- “The rich man is an inexorable brute whom one is forced to stop with a pitchfork or a round of grapeshot in the belly...”
- “And they [rich Catholics] dare to speak of charity, to pronounce the word Caritas which is the very Name of the divine Third Person! Prostitution of words enough to put fear in the devil! That beautiful lady, who does not have the honesty even to surrender her body to the poor souls whom she arouses, will go, this very evening, to show all that she can of her white, sepulchral flesh where jewels like worms quiver, and make herself worshipped by imbeciles, on supposed feast days of charity, on the occasion of some disaster, to fatten the sharks or shipwreckers a little more. The so-called Christian riches ejaculating on misery!”
- "All that happens in life is adorable."

== See also ==
- Three Versions of Judas by Jorge Luis Borges

== Sources ==
- Bloy, Léon (Ed. Raissa Maritain (1947). Pilgrim of the Absolute. New York: Pantheon Books.

Rayner Heppenstall 'Léon Bloy', (1953) Bowes & Bowes, Cambridge. (1954) Yale University Press, New Haven.
