= Le Désespéré =

Painting by Gustave Courbet

- Artist: Gustave Courbet
- Year: 1843-1845
- Medium: Oil on canvas
- Subject: Self-portrait
- Dimensions: 45 cm × 54 cm (18 in × 21 in)

Le Désespéré (The Desperate Man) is an oil-on-canvas self-portrait by Gustave Courbet, produced from 1843 to 1845, during his stay in Paris. It depicts Courbet as a young man staring in front of him with wide eyes, grasping his hair in desperation. It is now in the private collection of the Conseil Investissement Art BNP Paribas but was displayed in the Musée d'Orsay's 2007 Courbet exhibition.

== Description ==
The work is a self-portrait of Gustave Courbet who presents himself from the front, close-up, with his mouth half-open and his gaze plunging him into the spectator's. His eyes are wide and both his hands seem ready to pull out his hair. He wears a dark blue scarf loosely around his neck. The paleness of his face contrasts with the darkness of his hair and beard, all reinforced by the whiteness of the shirt. The light source accentuates the contrasts from above, on the left.

== History of the painting ==
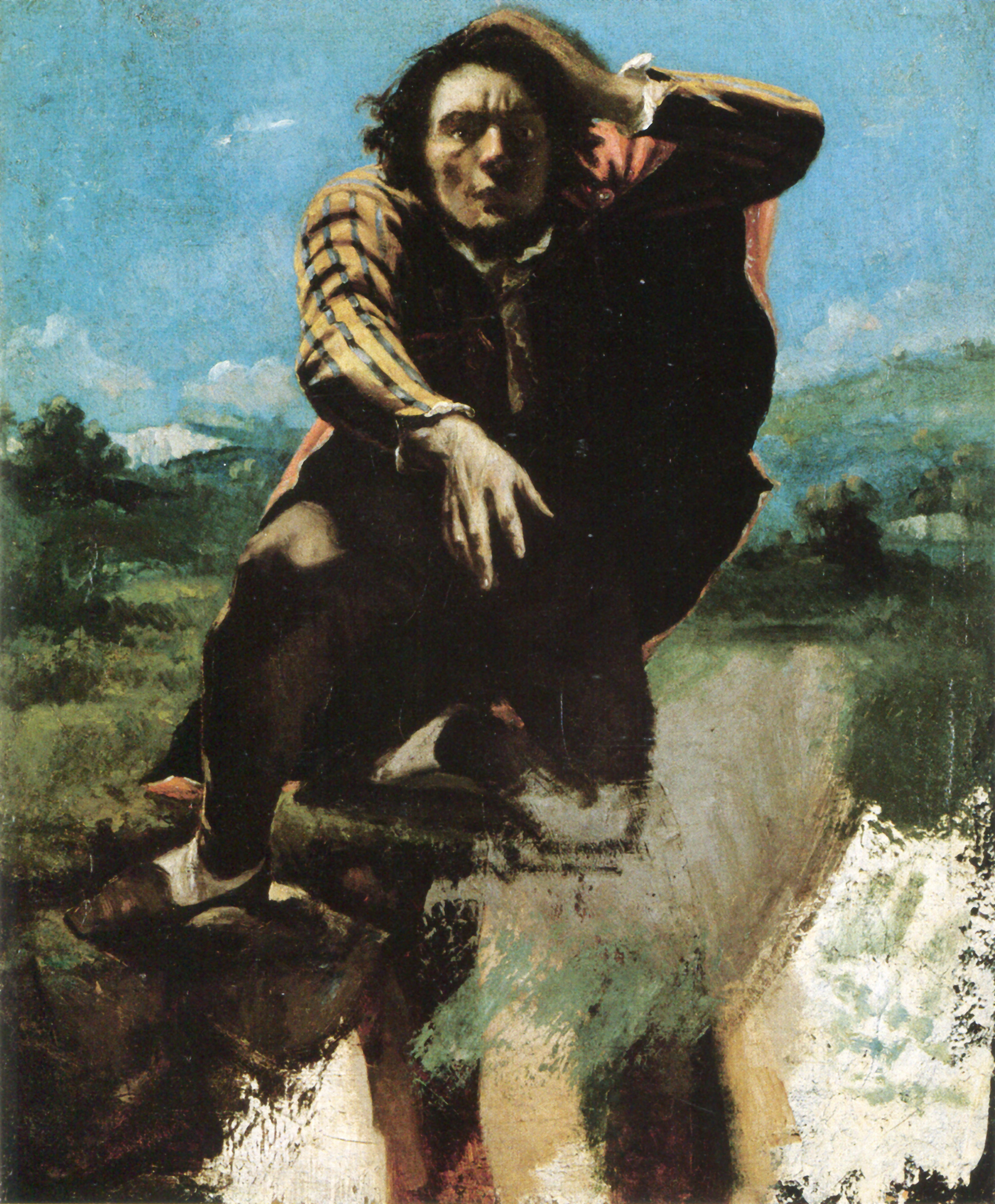
The Man Made Mad with Fear, unfinished gouache-on-paper sketch by Courbet (1843–1844, National Gallery of Norway)

In the 1840s, Courbet produced portraits of his friends and clients as well as self-portraits, including Self-Portrait with a Black Dog (1842). He spent time in the Louvre copying works by José de Ribera, Francisco de Zurbarán, Diego Velasquez and Rembrandt which influenced the beginnings of his work. He broke from his traditional vertical format for the work.

Researchers estimate that this painting (oil on canvas, 45 cm × 54 cm) was made between 1843 and 1845, at the beginning of Courbert's stay in Paris.

He was attached to Le Désespéré, taking it with him when he went into exile in Switzerland in 1873. A few years later doctor Paul Collin's description of Courbet's studio included a mention of "a painting showing Courbet with a desperate expression, for this reason entitled Désespoir".

The canvas previously belonged to a private investment collection, but was exhibited at the Musée d'Orsay in 2007 for the Courbet retrospective, which later traveled to the Metropolitan Museum of Art, New York, and Schirn Kunsthalle in Frankfurt.

On October 14, 2025, Le Désespéré went on display at the Musée d’Orsay, the first time it had been exhibited in France in 17 years. At the same time it was announced that the Qatar Museums had acquired the work. It will remain at the Musée d'Orsay for five years before being transferred to Doha.

== Analysis ==
Courbet adopts a landscape format in opposition to the more traditional portrait format for such subject matter.

The romantic approach of portraiture was focused on emotion. This portrait follows that tendency and Courbet, although he never defined himself as a romantic painter, made his first paintings under this influence. The Desperate Man thus follows the tradition of Jacques-Louis David's stereotyped expressions as well as 17th-century Spanish painters such as José de Ribera and Francisco de Zurbarán, whom Courbet then studied at the Louvre.

It is not known whether the title of this canvas reflects the despair of the artist himself or whether it is merely a theoretical exercise. The painting may be an indication of Courbet's dark side, as he revealed to his friend and patron Alfred Bruyas in a letter: "Through this laughing mask that you know me with, I hide the sorrow, the bitterness, and the sadness that grips the heart like a vampire from within."

== In popular culture ==
In 2012, the painting was referenced in the film Associates against Crime, starring Catherine Frot and André Dussollier. The painting is also cited in the third chapter ("Nacsuna") of Jean-Christophe Grangé's Le Passager.

It is remarkably close to a specific shot of the human prince in Disney's Beauty and the Beast (1991 film), and may have been a visual reference.

== See also ==
- Self-portraiture

== Bibliography (in French) ==
- Courbet on the website of the Musée d'Orsay
- Le désespéré: a short video on Dailymotion
- Coli Jorge: « L’Atelier de Courbet », in: Art Absolument, Autumn 2007, no. 22, p. 59–63
