= Development Commission =

The Development Commission was a body established by Lloyd George in 1909 to stop the decline of rural populations in the British Isles and to support rural industries and voluntary bodies. The Commissioners were first appointed to oversee the Development Fund, established in that year. It was merged with the Council for Small Industries in Rural Areas in 1988 to form the Rural Development Commission.

The eight original commissioners included Lord Richard Cavendish in the paid position of chairperson with Sir Francis Hopwood and Sir Sidney Webb as vice chairs.
