= The Desperate Man (novel) =

1887 French novel by Léon Bloy

- Author: Léon Bloy
- Original title: Le Désespéré
- Translator: Richard Robinson
- Language: French
- Genre: Fiction, Novel, Decadent Literature, Roman à Clef
- Publisher: Alphonse Soirat (1887, French), Tresse & Stock (1893, French), Snuggly Books (2020, English), Sunny Lou Publishing (2023, 2nd Edition, English)
- Publication date: 1887, 1893
- Publication place: France
- English publication date: 2020 (1st Edition), 2023 (2nd Edition)
- Pages: 360 (English)

The Desperate Man (Le Désespéré in French) is a novel written by French author Léon Bloy and originally prepared for publication in 1886 but officially published in 1887. That the author's first novel should have had such a rocky start seems characteristic of the life of both author and protagonist.

The novel follows the brilliant but impoverished Caïn Marchenoir, an intransigeant Catholic writer of great promise living in Paris at the beginning of the French Third Republic, as he struggles to balance two pairs of seemingly opposite and incompatible forces in his life. The first pair of incompatible forces he struggles with is an intense love for God with the need to follow honestly and thoughtfully the teachings of the Catholic Church, which is at odds with his strong extramarital sexual desire for a beautiful but naive ex-prostitute cum devout Catholic and aspiring saint (who later ends up in a mental institution). The second pair is a real and pressing need for stable income (a job) which is at odds with an intense disgust for, and rage against, the hypocritical, self-serving, corrupt attitudes and behaviors of the contemporary press and literary world of the time, as he sees it.

It begins with a death (his father's) and ends with a death (his own), which makes it a tragedy arguably, while everything in between treats of the semi-autobiographical, extreme, and ostensively manic-depressive ups and downs of several months or telescopic years 'in the life' of a talented but desperate man.

== Publication ==
J.-K. Huysmans, a friend of the Bloy's at the time, helped him to find a publisher for the work, -- Huysmans' own publisher at the time, Tresse & Stock. Because of the atrabilious, satirical, contentious, and arguably libelous portrayal of many of the thinly veiled and pseudonymous characters in the novel, many of whom in real life were still alive at the time and some of whom in powerful places (e.g., Francis Magnard and Albert Wolff, both editors of Le Figaro), Tresse & Stock got cold feet and delayed or refused to go forward with its publication. Consequently, another publisher was found (Alphonse Soirat) who fearlessly published the novel, with the author's permission, on January 15, 1887. When, in 1893, after several years had passed, Tresse & Stock realizing that the original publisher was not being, and had not been, hauled into court for libel, they proceeded to dust off and put out for sale, without the author's permission by this time, the thousand or so copies they had printed in 1886 with an introductory note that leaves "to the author the entire responsibility of his judgments and assessments" and keeps "ourselves simply within our right as publishers and merchants of literary curiosities."

== Critical response ==
"... Bloy's force [in this novel] owes as much to the rigor of his morality as to his resplendent polemical style; an inspired, Gothic Cathedral style. Flamboyant! The words are spewed out with rage in this novel with its rocky peaks, and complex and diffuse style. Backbreaking because it's made of granite, it's a literary sword that exhorts each one of us to forge a soul in fire! For this novel has really to do with the soul... This soul which ought to be the only human concern!"

"There are quite a few ways of presenting The Desperate Man, but all of them I think would have to evoke its extraordinary verbal violence, which is none other than the counterpart of a whole, inconceivable in our day when geldings are recompensed by so-called literary prizes as if they were battle steeds, his stylistic invention, which French literature has never perhaps seen to such a degree of concentration, or preciptiation, since Léon Bloy, except in Louis-Ferdinand Céline.... Léon Bloy's incendiary violence [in this novel] is parabolic, apocalyptic... it deploys a magnificent canvas that a half-mad painter would have patiently painted to try and replace reality, and offers to its spectators, dumbfounded, a second reality enriched by a symbolic interpretation of History and its arcana."

"The Desperate Man is the autobiographical recitation of that poor wretch who will pass his life in filthy poverty, hurling his hatred at the stupidity of the middleclass, all the while cherishing the prostitutes whom he removes from their misery while devoting themselves to Christ above all with supernatural delectation. But it's not a blissful smile that characterizes this love, absolutely not. Rather, it's a torrent of tears. The bleeding feet of the Messiah are inundated, the pale face of the poor are as well. Incredible work!"

"Inspired by the 1846 apparition of the Virgin Mary at La Salette, Bloy had been convinced by the Virgin’s message that, unless the wicked reformed and the people observed the Sabbath, the end time would come and engulf Christendom in fire. Along with J.-K. Huysmans, Bloy subscribed to a belief in Dolorism, a doctrine affirming the sanctity of suffering, holding that through mystic substitution, the martyrdom of innocents could redeem the transgressions of the guilty... This is the hermeneutic principle of Le Désespéré, Bloy’s parable of human misery: to disclose the occult truths concealed in this “palimpseste de douleur.”

"If The Desperate Man... is autobiographical at the very least: one does not need to be a great scholar to observe how the character of Caïn Marchenoir 'gifted, by nature, to the observation of social hideousness' and looking at the modern world as if it were 'an Atlantis submerged in a garbage dump,' corresponds with the idea that Léon Bloy has of himself, at least the effort with which he wants to constrain his existence and the direction he wants to impose on it. Mystical, misanthropic, revolutionary, anti-bourgeois, ascetic, contemnor of his times, this hero is the spitting image of the common representation one has of Bloy."
