= The Woman Who Was Poor =

1897 novel by Léon Bloy

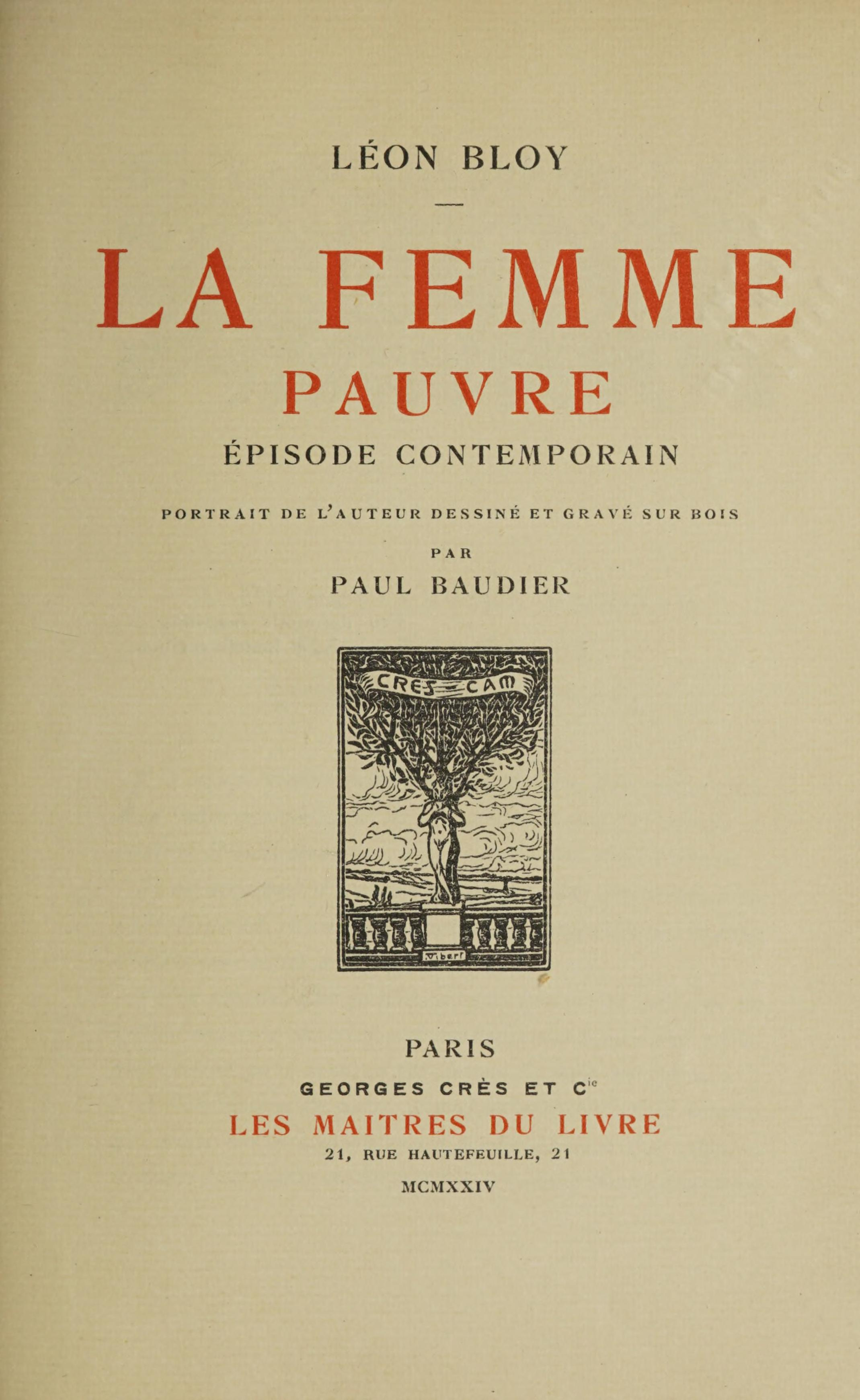
- Title page for La Femme pauvre (1924)
- Author: Léon Bloy
- Original title: La Femme pauvre
- Translator: I. J. Collins
- Language: French
- Publisher: Mercure de France
- Publication date: 1897
- Publication place: France
- English publication date: 1939
- Pages: 396

The Woman Who Was Poor (French: La Femme pauvre) is an 1897 novel by the French writer Léon Bloy. It follows a woman, Clotilde, who becomes involved with the Paris art and literary scene in the 1880s. It was Bloy's second novel. An English translation by I. J. Collins was published in 1939.

== Reception ==
Ernest Boyd of the Saturday Review wrote in 1939 about the English-language edition:

The translator duly apologizes for his squeamishness, although none of our current exponents of the "Anglo-Saxon" monosyllables would have been deterred by Bloy, even if disgusted by his deliberate and unnecessary blasphemies. But as this book is described as having had "an immeasurable effect on all European Catholic writing," the task of making Bloy acceptable to English-speaking, Catholic puritans was a delicate one, and Mr. Collins has done very well.

Boyd continued about the book itself:

This novel is full of excellent talk about art, literature, and music; it contains a marvelous picture of Huysmans (by an ex-friend) and a lively portrait of Villiers de I'Isle-Adam. It will be hard for the non-French and non-Catholic reader to grasp the hold that Bloy could have on men like Péguy, and that he should have led Jacques Maritain back to Mother Church will baffle most admirers of that subtle, first-class mind.

Kirkus Reviews wrote that the novel does not "move with swift and arresting action" but has "passages of great beauty and the character delineation [is] interesting". The critic wrote that the book "is saturated with Catholic thought and allusions but is by no means just a pietistic tract in novel form, for Léon Bloy was an accomplished novelist."
