= Baron Southborough =

Extinct barony in the Peerage of the United Kingdom

Barony of Southborough
- Paly of six ermine and vert a bend raguly or charged with three escallops gules
- Creation date: 1 November 1917
- Created by: King George V
- Peerage: Peerage of the United Kingdom
- First holder: Sir Francis Hopwood
- Last holder: Francis Hopwood, 4th Baron Southborough
- Remainder to: First baron's heirs male of the body lawfully begotten
- Status: Extinct
- Extinction date: 15 June 1992
- Motto: Sperarem ("I hope")

Baron Southborough, of Southborough in the County of Kent, was a title in the Peerage of the United Kingdom. It was created on 1 November 1917 for civil servant Sir Francis Hopwood. He was Permanent Under-Secretary of State for the Colonies between 1907 and 1911.

He was succeeded by James, his son from his first marriage to Alice Smith-Neill (1862–1889). The second baron was also a civil servant and worked for the Board of Trade and Ministry of Labour as well as for the War Trade Intelligence Department and War Trade Department. On his death the title passed to his half-brother, the first baron's son by his second marriage to Florence Emily Black. The title became extinct on the death of the latter's son, the fourth Baron, on 15 June 1992.

== Barons Southborough (1917) ==
- Francis John Stephens Hopwood, 1st Baron Southborough (1860–1947)
- James Spencer Neill Hopwood, 2nd Baron Southborough (1889–1960)
- Francis John Hopwood, 3rd Baron Southborough (1897–1982)
- Francis Michael Hopwood, 4th Baron Southborough (1922–1992)
