= Francis Hopwood, 1st Baron Southborough =

British civil servant and solicitor

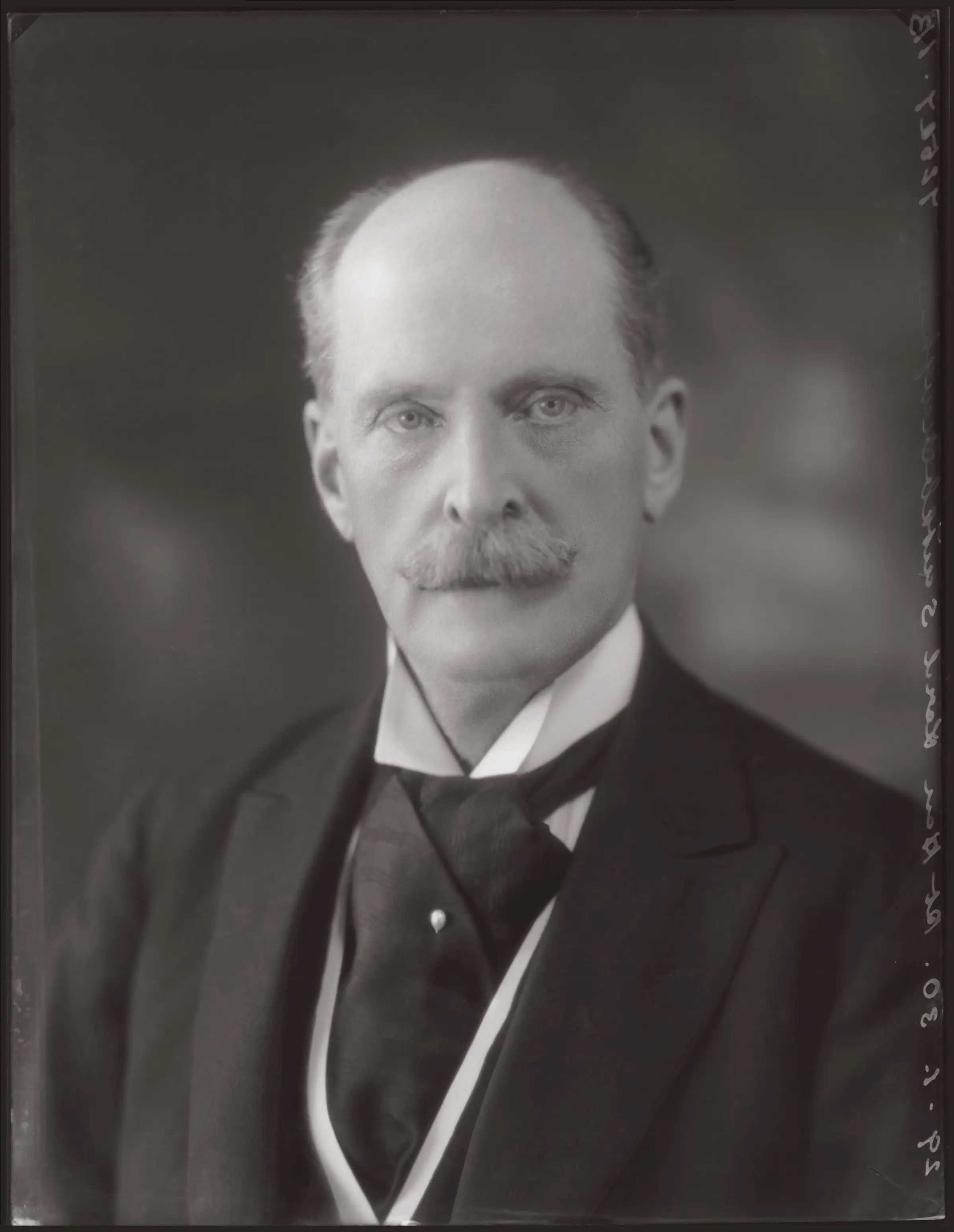
Hopwood in 1930

Francis John Stephens Hopwood, 1st Baron Southborough, GCB, GCMG, GCVO, KCSI, PC (2 December 1860 – 17 January 1947) was a British civil servant and solicitor. Over the course of his official career, Hopwood served as permanent secretary to the Board of Trade and the Colonial Office, a member of the Board of Admiralty, and secretary to the Irish Convention. In addition, he served on numerous commissions and was sent by the British government to Scandinavia in 1917 to secretly investigate rumours of Austrian peace proposals. Highly regarded as a civil servant, Hopwood was described by his obituarist as "a civil servant all the time, and a very correct one, whose personal views and contributions to discussions or action were never trumpeted in public".

Hopwood was born in Bayswater, London, the son of a barrister. He was educated at King Edward VI School, Louth, Lincolnshire, of which his uncle was headmaster, and was admitted solicitor in 1882. In 1885 he became an assistant law clerk to the Board of Trade, and was appointed Assistant Solicitor to the Board in 1888 and private secretary to the President of the Board of Trade in 1892. In 1893 he became Secretary to the Railway Department and in 1901 Permanent Secretary to the Board of Trade. In 1906 he went to South Africa as a member of the committee to determine the constitutions of the Transvaal and the Orange River Colony.

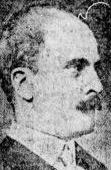
Hopwood in c. 1910

In 1907 he was appointed Permanent Under-Secretary of State for the Colonies and in 1910 vice-chairman of the Development Commission. In 1912 he was appointed to the Privy Council and appointed Additional Civil Lord of the Admiralty. In 1917 he was elected secretary to the Irish Convention, set up to explore solutions to the Irish Home Rule question. In 1919 he chaired the Franchise Committee looking into the suffrage in India. He chaired the War Office Committee of Enquiry into Shell-Shock from 1920 to 1922. Thereafter he entered business, taking a number of directorships.

Hopwood was appointed Companion of the Order of St Michael and St George (CMG) in 1893, Companion of the Order of the Bath (CB) in 1895, Knight Commander of the Order of the Bath (KCB) in November 1901, Knight Commander of the Order of St Michael and St George (KCMG) in 1906, Knight Grand Cross of the Order of St Michael and St George (GCMG) in 1908, Knight Grand Cross of the Order of the Bath (GCB) in 1916, Knight Grand Cross of the Royal Victorian Order (GCVO) in 1917, and Knight Commander of the Order of the Star of India (KCSI) in the 1920 New Year Honours. On 1 November 1917 he was created Baron Southborough, of Southborough in the County of Kent.

Hopwood was appointed Registrar of the Order of Saint Michael and Saint George in 1907, and Secretary of the Order in 1909.

The lifeboat RNLB Lord Southborough (Civil Service No. 1) (ON 688) was named after him.

== Footnotes ==
Political offices
Preceded by Sir Montagu Ommanney	Permanent Under-Secretary of State for the Colonies; 1907–1911	Succeeded by Sir John Anderson
New post	Additional Civil Lord of the Admiralty; 1912–1918	Succeeded by Arthur Pease
Peerage of the United Kingdom
New creation	Baron Southborough; 1917–1947	Succeeded by James Hopwood
