= Malcolm Henderson =

Malcolm Henderson may refer to:

- Malcolm Henderson (RAF officer)
- Malcolm Henderson (diplomat)
