= William Mayes Fry =

- William Mayes Fry c.1917
- Born: 14 November 1896; Twickenham, Middlesex, England
- Died: 4 August 1992 (aged 95); Greenwich, London, England
- Military career
- Allegiance: United Kingdom
- Branch: British Army; Royal Air Force
- Service years: 1915–1934; 1939–1945
- Rank: Wing Commander
- Units: Somerset Light Infantry; No. 11 Squadron RFC; No. 12 Squadron RFC; No. 60 Squadron RFC; No. 23 Squadron RFC; No. 79 Squadron RAF; No. 7 Squadron RAF; No. 99 Squadron RAF; No. 216 Squadron RAF
- Conflicts: World War I World War II
- Awards: Military Cross

Wing Commander William Mayes Fry MC (14 November 1896 – 4 August 1992) was a World War I Royal Flying Corps and Royal Air Force fighter ace. He was credited with eleven aerial victories, piloting no fewer than four different types of fighter aircraft. Fry also has the distinction of being one of the few World War I airmen to survive to the 1990s.

== World War I ==
Fry joined the army and was commissioned as a second lieutenant in the Somerset Light Infantry on 10 June 1915. Later he trained as a pilot, receiving Royal Aero Club Aviator's Certificate No. 3003 after flying a Maurice Farman biplane at the Military Flying School, Birmingham, on 24 May 1916, and on 16 June he was appointed a flying officer in the Royal Flying Corps, and transferred to the General List.

He first served in No. 12 Squadron, then No. 11 Squadron, flying BE.2s during the Battle of the Somme, and being promoted to lieutenant on 31 October 1916.

His "C" Flight was then transferred to No. 60 Squadron, where, flying a Nieuport 17, Fry scored his first win on 2 May 1917; two days later, he shared a victory with Billy Bishop. Further solo victories were gained on 13 and 19 May, and for his fifth, an Albatros D.III was driven down out of control on 16 June, shared with Keith Caldwell. During this time, he also flew Morane-Saulnier Is, and one of his squadron-mates was Albert Ball.

On 16 August 1917 Fry was awarded the Military Cross, his citation reading:

Temporary Second Lieutenant (Temporary Lieutenant) William Mayes Fry, General List and Royal Flying Corps.
For conspicuous gallantry and devotion duty. Diving to a very low altitude, and under heavy fire, he emptied all his ammunition into the retreating enemy. During the last month he has brought down four hostile machines. He has done consistent good work as a pilot.

On 1 September 1917 he was appointed a flight commander with the temporary rank of captain, and was transferred to No. 23 Squadron to command "C" Flight. Flying a SPAD VII he gained wins on 20 November and 12 December 1917. He upgraded to a SPAD XIII for his next win, on 4 January 1918. Two days later, he was back in a SPAD VII, hunting in company with Frank Granger Quigley. They jointly shot down and killed Pour le Merite winner Leutnant Walter von Bülow-Bothkamp. Fry would score once more in a SPAD XIII, shooting down in flames an Albatros on 23 January. Fry then transferred to No. 79 Squadron, where he claimed his last victim, using a Sopwith Dolphin to down a Fokker Dr.I on 11 May 1918. For his final tally, besides destroying the two enemy fighters in company with Bishop and Quigley and flaming the Albatros, Mays had destroyed two other enemy aircraft, captured one, and driven down four others.

== Post-war ==
Fry remained in the Royal Air Force post-war, and on 16 September 1919 granted a short service commission with the rank of flight lieutenant, however this was later cancelled, and Fry was transferred to the unemployed list on 31 January 1920.

Fry returned to the RAF within eighteen months, being granted a short service commission with the rank of flying officer on 18 July 1921, being promoted to flight lieutenant on 30 June 1923, and his commission was made permanent on 23 April 1924. On 10 September 1924 Fry was posted to No. 7 Squadron, based at RAF Bircham Newton in Norfolk. From 4 December 1925 he served at the Station Headquarters of Bircham Newton, and on 2 March 1930 he was assigned to No. 99 Squadron, based at RAF Upper Heyford in Oxfordshire.

Fry then served in Egypt, being posted to the Depot at RAF Aboukir on 10 March 1931, then to No. 216 Squadron, based at Heliopolis, on 15 January 1932. On 1 May 1934 Fry left the RAF, being placed on the retired list at his own request.

Fry returned to RAF service during World War II, serving from 1939 until 1945, rising to the rank of wing commander, and receiving a mention in dispatches on 1 January 1945, before returning to the retired list on 15 July 1945, retaining the rank of wing commander.

Fry died in Greenwich, London on 4 August 1992, aged 95.

== Personal life ==
In July 1924 Fry became engaged to Katherine Mary Carrington, the daughter of Major General Sir Frederick Carrington, KCB, KCMG, and the sister of Dorothy Carrington. They were married in Colesbourne, Gloucestershire, on 20 August.
