= Theodor Quandt =

German World War I flying ace

- Born: 22 June 1897; Mollaud, East Prussia
- Died: 6 June 1940 (aged 42); France
- Military career
- Allegiance: German Empire; Nazi Germany
- Branch: Imperial German Army; Luftstreitkräfte; Luftwaffe
- Service years: 1914-1918; 1936-1940
- Rank: Major
- Units: Flieger-Abteilung (Artillerie) (Flier Detachment (Artillery) 270; Jagdstaffel 36 (Fighter Squadron 36)
- Commands: Jagdstaffel 53 (Fighter Squadron 53)
- Conflicts: World War I World War II: Battle of France †
- Awards: Royal House Order of Hohenzollern
- Other work: Flew combat in WWII Luftwaffe

Major Theodor Quandt (22 June 1897 – 6 June 1940) was a World War I German flying ace credited with 15 aerial victories. He would return to his nation's service for World War II, being killed on 6 June 1940 during the Fall of France.

== Birth and early military service ==
Theodor Quandt was born in Mollaud, Prussia on 22 June 1897.

He enlisted in the infantry on 4 August 1914, while he was still 17 years old. He later served as an artilleryman. He was a combatant in the Battle of Tannenberg on the Eastern Front. He was switched to the Western Front in early 1916. On 1 July, he began aerial service, training as a pilot. Once qualified, he was posted to Flieger-Abteilung (Artillerie) (Flier Detachment (Artillery) 270), an artillery direction unit equipped with Rumpler C.IV reconnaissance aircraft and operating in support of the German 3rd Army, on 1 January 1917. He served with them until transferred to Jagdstaffel 36 (Fighter Squadron 36) (also known as Jasta 36) on 1 April. Rather unusually, he did not undergo fighter training before making the switch.

== World War I flying service ==
Quandt claimed his first victories with Jagdstaffel 36 as a balloon buster, shooting down a pair of observation balloons near Bouvancourt on 21 May 1917. The Staffel moved to Flanders for operations against the British in June 1917, and between 11 August and 8 November, Quandt was credited with six more aircraft shot down.

On 24 December 1917, Quandt was transferred to Jagdstaffel 53 as its commanding officer. On 10 May 1918, he was awarded the Knight's Cross with Swords of the House Order of Hohenzollern. On 21 August 1918, Quandt returned to Jasta 36, replacing Harry von Bülow-Bothkamp as commanding officer. On 27 August 1918, Quandt shot down two Sopwith Camels, his first victories for almost ten months. His eleventh credited shoot down, on 1 September 1918, was over American ace John Donaldson. He then shot down four more aircraft in the next three days, but on 17 September, a British air-raid on Jasta 36's airfield at Aniche destroyed several aircraft, and the unit was withdrawn from combat. Quandt finished the war as a lieutenant.

== World War II flying service ==
In 1936, Quandt joined the Luftwaffe as a reserve officer, and on the outbreak of World War II, was called up to active service, joining Jagdgeschwader 20 (JG 20), and was promoted to Major later that month, before transferring to JG 3. Quandt was shot down and killed in action on 6 June 1940 while flying a Messerschmitt Bf 109 during the Battle of France, his aircraft crashing near Envermeu, east of Dieppe.
