= Cecil D'Arcy =

Recipient of the Victoria Cross

Cecil D'Arcy VC
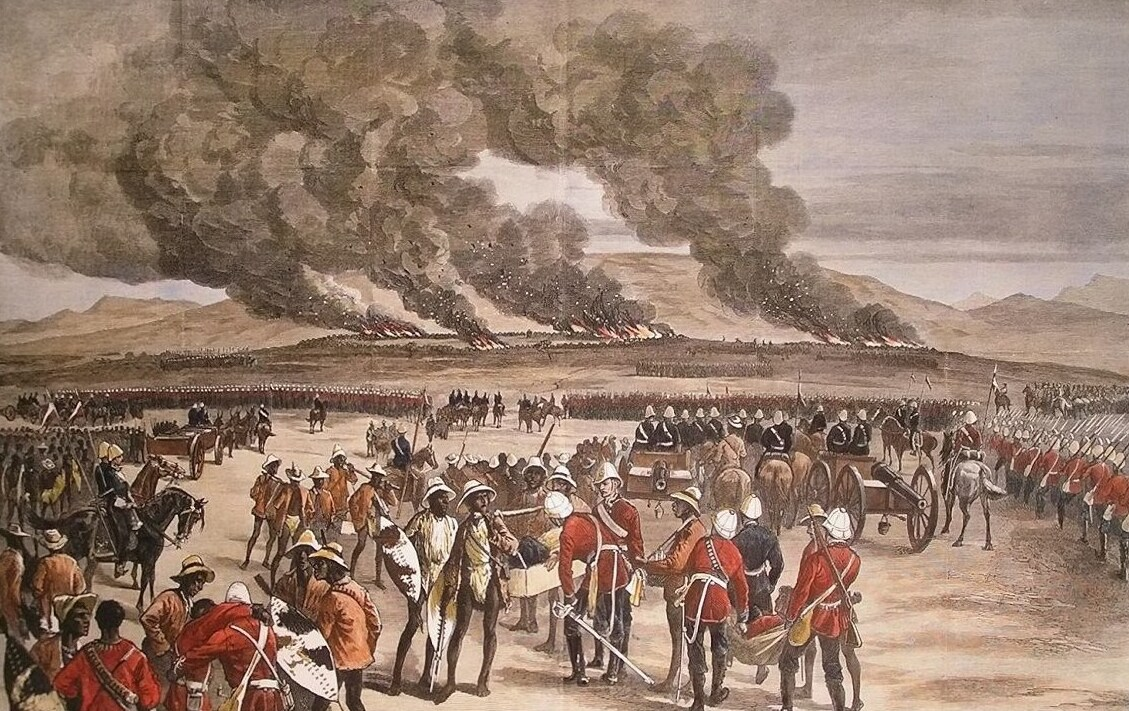
- The burning of Ulundi
- Born: 11 August 1850; Wanganui, New Zealand
- Died: 1881 (aged 30/31); Amatola Forest Cape Colony (now South Africa)
- Burial place: King William's Town cemetery
- Military career
- Allegiance: Cape Colony
- Branch: Cape Colonial Forces
- Rank: Captain
- Units: Cape Frontier Light Horse
- Conflicts: Anglo-Zulu War Battle of Ulundi Battle of Kambula; Basuto Gun War
- Awards: Victoria Cross

Henry Cecil Dudgeon D'Arcy VC (11 August 1850 – 1881) was a New Zealand-born recipient of the Victoria Cross, the highest and most prestigious award for gallantry in the face of the enemy that can be awarded to British and Commonwealth forces. He won the VC on 3 July 1879 at Ulundi in South Africa during the Anglo-Zulu War when he was 28 years old, and a captain in the Frontier Light Horse.

== Early life ==
D'Arcy was born in Wanganui, New Zealand, where his father Major Oliver Barker D'Arcy (sometimes D'Arcey) of the 65th Regiment was in the British garrison. In 1860, Oliver D'Arcy transferred to the Cape Mounted Riflemen and settled with his family at King William's Town in the Cape Colony.

== Anglo-Zulu War ==
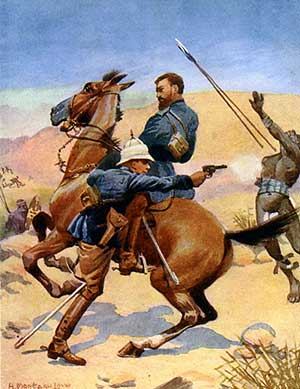
Redvers Buller's VC action, painted by H. Montagu Love (1905)

During the Anglo-Zulu War of 1879, Cecil D'Arcy was an officer in the Frontier Light Horse, a mounted unit of 200 volunteers raised at King William's Town in 1877 by Lieutenant Frederick Carrington.

At the Battle of Hlobane on 28 March 1879, his unit acted as the rearguard and 20% of the 156 members were killed. D'Arcy was recommended for the VC by Evelyn Wood for going back to save the lives of wounded men in the descent of Devil's Pass; the award was not approved on the grounds that he was a volunteer and not a member of the imperial forces. Five other awards were approved, including to Colonel Redvers Buller; he had rescued D'Arcy who was retiring on foot and carrying him on his horse, while hotly pursued by Zulus.

At the Battle of Kambula on the following day, the Frontier Light Horse were part of the pursuit of the retreating Zulu forces. Captain D'Arcy wrote in a letter published in The Natal Mercury in April that they "followed them for eight miles, butchering the brutes all over the place. I told the men, 'No quarter, boys, and remember yesterday'. And they did knock them about, killing them all over the place". The FLH troopers extracted their revenge for their comrades killed the day before at Hlobane.

He was awarded the VC for his actions on 3 July 1879 when a mounted reconnaissance was ambushed near Ulundi. In a dispatch dated 5 July in The London Gazette, Redvers Buller wrote that D'Arcy "reckons neither personal inconvenience nor danger in the execution of any order, determined and bold; he has frequently shown great personal gallantry, and has always given a fine example to his men." The citation of the VC award reads;

For his gallant conduct on the 3rd July, 1879, during the reconnaissance made before Ulundi by the Mounted Corps, in endeavouring to rescue Trooper Raubenheim, of the Frontier Light Horse, who fell from his horse as the troops were retiring. Captain D'Arcy, though the Zulus were close upon them, waited for the man to mount behind him; the horse kicked them both off, and though much hurt by the fall and quite alone, Captain D'Arcy coolly endeavoured to lift the trooper, who was stunned, on to the horse, and it was only when he found that he had not strength to do so that he mounted and rode off. His escape was miraculous as the Zulus had actually closed upon him.

He was presented with his medal in December 1879 by Sir Garnet Wolseley in Pretoria.

== Further information ==
After the Frontier Light Horse was disbanded, D'Arcy joined the Cape Mounted Riflemen as a captain. He served in the 1880 Basuto Gun War, but resigned his commission in April 1881.

In ill health, he stayed with Rev. Charles Taberer in Keiskammahoek to recuperate. During the night of 6–7 August 1881 he left the house; his body was not found for several months. He was interred on 3 January 1882 in the cemetery of King William's Town beside his parents.

He is also considered South African, though he probably considered himself British or Anglo-Irish.

== Speculation ==
In 2008, David Randall in The Independent newspaper in London reported claims that D'Arcy faked his death.

No longer is anyone likely to imitate Captain Henry Cecil Dudgeon D'Arcy of the Frontier Light Horse, who, having been awarded the VC in the Zulu wars, turned to drink. Later, a body wearing his clothes was found in a cave and, this being the pathology of a century ago, presumed to be his. Only many decades later was it learnt that D'Arcy had found a dead man lying in the snow, changed clothes with him, and gone to Natal, and lived out the rest of his life under an assumed name. He was once recognised in 1925, but swore his discoverer to the secret, which the man kept until D'Arcy died.

== See also ==
- Edmund O'Toole
- Lord William Beresford; both won the VC on 3 July 1879 at Ulundi during the retirement of a reconnoitring party.
