= Bongartz =

Bongartz is a surname. Notable people with the surname include:

- Hannes Bongartz (born 1951), German football coach and former player
- Heinrich Bongartz (1892–1946), German World War I fighter pilot
- Heinz Bongartz (1894–1978), German conductor and composer
- Seth Bongartz, American politician
