= Henry Darcy (disambiguation) =

Henry Darcy (1803–1858) was a French engineer.

Henry Darcy may also refer to:

- Henry Darcy (MP), member of parliament for Knaresborough and Huntingdonshire
- Cecil D'Arcy (Henry Cecil Dudgeon D'Arcy, 1850–1881), VC recipient
