= No. 221 Group RAF =

Former operations group of the Royal Air Force

No. 221 Group, Royal Air Force
- Active: 21 April 1941–30 September 1945
- Country: United Kingdom
- Allegiance: Monarch of the United Kingdom
- Branch: Royal Air Force
- Type: Royal Air Force group
- Part of: Air Forces in India (RAF)

No. 221 Group, Royal Air Force (221 Gp RAF) was a group of the Royal Air Force (RAF) during the Second World War, active in various guises in Burma and north-eastern India from 21 April 1941; 85 years ago.

After reforming in Calcutta on 12 March 1942; 84 years ago, it served as part of the Third Tactical Air Force. Group Headquarters was at Asansol from 18 August to 12 December 1942.

In India, Nos. 20 and 28 Squadrons flying Westland Lysanders were listed as non-operational, but part of 221 Group RAF in the army co-operation role from Jamshedpur and Ranchi, respectively, on 1 July 1942.

Among squadrons that operated with the group in Eastern India and Burma were No. 7 Squadron IAF (Hawker Hurricane), located at Kumbhirgram from November 1944 until May 1946; No. 34 Squadron; No. 131 Squadron RAF; and No. 152 Squadron RAF.

== Composition ==
As of 1 June 1944, the group comprised:

- No. 168 Wing RAF
  - No. 60 Squadron RAF (Hawker Hurricane); No. 81 Squadron RAF (Supermarine Spitfire), Kumbhirgram; No. 84 Squadron RAF (Vultee Vengeance)
- No. 170 Wing RAF
  - Nos. 1 (I.A.F.), No. 11 Squadron RAF, No. 42 Squadron RAF, No. 113 Squadron RAF (Hawker Hurricane);
  - No. 607, No. 615 Squadron RAuxAF (Supermarine Spitfire)
- No. 243 Wing RAF
  - Nos 28 and 34 Squadrons RAF (Hawker Hurricane)

Group Headquarters was at Meiktila from April to June 1945.

No. 81 Squadron disbanded at Amarda Road Airstrip, India in June 1945.

Air Vice-Marshal Cecil Bouchier assumed command of No. 221 Group from Air Vice-Marshal Stanley Vincent on 15 June 1945. Bouchier's headquarters was at Rangoon.

The group disbanded on 30 September 1945; 80 years ago, still in Rangoon. Its duties were taken over by RAF Burma.

== Headquarters ==
- 21 April 1941 — Randeia Buildings, Phagre Street, Rangoon
- 25 October 1941 — Windermere Park, Rangoon
- 31 October 1941 — became BURGROUP
- 12 December 1941 — reverted to No. 221 Group
- February 1942 — became NORGROUP
- Disbanded 12 March 1942
- Reformed 12 March 1942 — La Martinere School, 11 Loudon Street, Calcutta
- 18 August 1942 — St. Vincent de Paul's School, Asansol
- 11 December 1942 — Calcutta
- 15 December 1943 — Imphal as No. 221 (Tactical) Group
- 13 January 1945 — Kalemyo
- 15 February 1945 — Monywa
- 12 April 1945 — RAF Meiktila
- June 1945 — Rangoon
