= 5th Fighter Division =

Division of the German Luftwaffe in WWII

5th Fighter Division (5. Jagd-Division) was one of the primary divisions of the German Luftwaffe in World War II. It was formed in June 1943 and subordinated to the 12th Air Corps. The Division was reorganised as 7th Fighter Division on 15 September 1943 and reformed again the same day in Paris and subordinated to the 2nd Fighter Corps. The unit was relocated to Karlsruhe-Durlach in October 1944 and subordinated to Luftwaffenkommando West. The division was redesignated to 16th Air Division on 26 January 1945.

== Commanding officers ==
- Generalleutnant Walter Schwabedissen, July 1942 – 15 September 1943
- Oberst Harry von Bülow-Bothkamp, September 1943 – November 1943
- Generalleutnant Joachim-Friedrich Huth, 11 November 1943 – 5 February 1944
- Generalmajor Karl Hentschel, February 1944 – 26 January 1945

== See also ==
- Luftwaffe Organisation
