= Harry von Bülow-Bothkamp =

German fighter pilot

- Harry von Bülow-Bothkamp
- Born: 19 November 1897; Bothkamp, Kingdom of Prussia, German Empire
- Died: 27 February 1976 (aged 78); Kirchbarkau, West Germany
- Relatives: Walter von Bülow-Bothkamp (brother)
- Military career
- Allegiance: German Empire; Nazi Germany
- Branch: Luftstreitkräfte; Luftwaffe
- Service years: 1916–18; 1935–45
- Rank: Oberst
- Units: JG 77, JG 2, NJG 101
- Commands: JG 2
- Conflicts: World War I World War II: Battle of France; Battle of Britain
- Awards: Iron Cross; Knight's Cross of the Iron Cross

Harry von Bülow-Bothkamp (19 November 1897 – 27 February 1976) was a German fighter pilot notable for being one of the few two-war aces in history. After scoring six victories in World War I, he became a Luftwaffe ace in World War II, with 12 additional victories. Also he was a member of the National Socialist Flyers Corps with the rank of NSFK-Obergruppenführer.

== Early life and World War I ==
Harry von Bülow-Bothkamp was a child of nobility, born in his family's castle in the village of Bothkamp in the Schleswig-Holstein Province of Germany. He began his military service with Saxon Hussar Regiment No. 18 when he was 17, before learning to fly in August 1916. In December 1916 he joined the German air service. He was one of three brothers (the others being Walter and Conrad) to serve in the Fliegertruppe during World War I. He first flew two-seaters with FFA 53, which became FA 272 (A), as a reconnaissance pilot directing artillery fire, before becoming a fighter pilot with Jasta 36, which was commanded by his brother Walter who fell on 6 January 1918.

During his time with Jasta 36, Harry von Bülow-Bothkamp shot down an Airco D.H.4 on 12 October 1917, followed by five additional enemy fighters. His last victory came on 21 July 1918, over Major R.H. Freeman, CO of 73 Squadron. His notable win was his fourth, over British 10-kill ace Captain Cecil Clark of 1 Squadron, who was wounded and taken prisoner.

Harry was discharged from the service by order of the Kaiser on 25 August 1918. Harry was the last survivor of four brothers; the oldest, Friedrich, was killed in 1914, Walter died in a dogfight at Ypres in January 1918, and Conrad died in a flying accident on 26 September 1918 while commanding part of the Aviation Battalion of the Finnish Air Force.

Harry had earned the Royal House Order of Hohenzollern and Iron Cross for his service.

== Between the wars ==
After World War I he returned to school (Gymnasium) receiving his Abitur and went to university studying agriculture. Together with Paul Bäumer he founded Bäumer Aero GMBH in Hamburg-Fuhlsbüttel to produce airplanes. The company went bankrupt in 1930 in the course of the Great Depression.

He rejoined the German military aviation as a Hauptmann (Captain) in 1935, in the newly established Luftwaffe. The following year, he was promoted to major and assigned as the original commanding officer of Jagdgeschwader 2 "Richthofen", also known as JG II. In 1939, he became Inspector of the Nationalsozialitische Fliegerkorps, the Luftwaffe's civil reserve.

== World War II and beyond ==
World War II in Europe began on Friday 1 September 1939 when German forces invaded Poland. On 30 November, Bülow-Bothkamp was appointed Gruppenkommandeur (group commander) of II. Gruppe (2nd group) of Jagdgeschwader 77 (JG 77—77th Fighter Wing), succeeding Oberstleutnant Carl-Alfred Schumacher in this capacity. He led this Gruppe until 31 March 1940, surrendering command of the Gruppe to Hauptmann Karl Hentschel. On 1 April, he took over command of Jagdgeschwader 2 "Richthofen" (JG 2—2nd Fighter Wing) as Geschwaderkommodore (wing commander) from Oberst Gerd von Massow.

Bülow-Bothkamp led JG 2 during the blitzkrieg into France during May and June 1940. Despite being over 40 years old, he vanquished at least 12 opponents in this campaign. This performance as a fighting commander of JG 2 earned him another promotion, to Oberstleutnant (Lieutenant Colonel), and he was awarded the Knight's Cross of the Iron Cross (Ritterkreuz des Eisernen Kreuzes) on 22 August 1940.

On 1 September 1940, he was reassigned to Nachtjagdschule 1 (Night Fight School 1). He remained in command of this unit through its redesignation as Nachtjagdgeschwader 101 (NJG 101), until October, 1943. He commanded the 5th Fighter Division from November, 1943 and then commanded Jafu 4 on the western front from March 1944 to September 1944. He ended the war back with the Nationalsozialistische Fliegerkorps.

He died of natural causes in Kirchbarkau, near his ancestral castle, where he was buried in the same plot as his brothers.

== Awards ==
- Iron Cross (1914)
  - 2nd Class (23 June 1916)
  - 1st Class (30 May 1917)
- Aviator badge (WW I) (3 March 1917)
- Albert Order II. Class with swords (9 May 1917)
- Military Order of St. Henry (7 October 1918)
- House Order of Hohenzollern (9 October 1918)
- Aviator badge (WW II) (4 February 1935)
- Wehrmacht Long Service Award 4. Class (2 October 1936)
- Clasp to the Iron Cross 2nd and 1st Class
- Knight's Cross of the Iron Cross on 22 August 1940 as Oberstleutnant of the Reserves and Geschwaderkommodore of Jagdgeschwader 2 "Richthofen"

== See also ==
Pilots who flew in combat in both World Wars

- Otto Höhne
- Erich Mix
- Louis Strange
- Theo Osterkamp, an ace in both World War I and II
- Stanley Vincent, the only British pilot to score victories in both wars.
- Marcel Haegelen, the only French pilot to score victories in both wars.

Lists

- List of World War I flying aces
- List of World War I flying aces by nationality
- List of World War II aces from Germany

Military offices
Preceded by Oberst Gerd von Massow	Commander of Jagdgeschwader 2 Richthofen; 1 April 1940 – 2 September 1940	Succeeded by Major Wolfgang Schellmann
Preceded by none	Commander of Jagdfliegerführer Süddeutschland; February 1943 – June 1943	Succeeded by: 5. Jagd-Division
Preceded by Generalleutnant Walter Schwabedissen	Commander of 5. Jagd-Division; September 1943 – 11 November 1943	Succeeded by Generalleutnant Joachim-Friedrich Huth
Preceded by Oberst Josef Priller	Commander of Jagdfliegerführer 4; 1 April 1944 – 31 August 1944	Succeeded by disbanded
