= No. 14 Group RAF =

Former Royal Air Force operations group

No. 14 (Fighter) Group RAF ~~No. 14 Group RAF~~
- Royal Air Force Ensign
- Active: 1 April 1918– 19 May 1919; 20 January 1940 – 22 June 1940; 26/29 June 1940 – 15 July 1943
- Country: United Kingdom
- Branch: Royal Air Force
- Type: Royal Air Force group
- Role: Anti-submarine (1918-1919); Fighter cover for Scotland (1940-1943)
- Part of: Midland Area (1918-1919); RAF Fighter Command (1940-1943)
- Garrison/HQ: Drumossie Hotel, Inverness (1940-1941); Raigmore House, Inverness (1941-1943)
- Engagements: World War II: European theatre of World War II; Battle of Britain

Commanders
- Notable commanders: Air Commodore Philip Fletcher Fullard CBE, DSO, MC & Bar, AFC

No. 14 Group RAF (14 Gp) was the title of several Royal Air Force groups, including a group responsible for anti-submarine activity from 1918 to 1919 after being transferred from the Royal Naval Air Service; a fighter group formed from a wing in the British Expeditionary Force in 1940; and finally a fighter group covering Scotland from 1940 to 1943.

== History ==
=== First World War ===
No. 14 Group RAF was first formed on 1 April 1918 by the re-designation of Milford Haven Anti-Submarine Group. On 8 May it was transferred to Midland Area, and it was disbanded on 19 May 1919.

=== Second World War ===
It was reformed as No. 14 (Fighter) Group on 20 January 1940 as part of the wartime expansion of the Royal Air Force when No. 60 Wing in the British Expeditionary Force was raised to group level under the command of World War I flying ace Group Captain Philip Fletcher Fullard. The Group was disbanded on 22 June.

Only three days later 14 Group was reformed in Fighter Command to provide cover for Scotland, and was then under the command of Air Vice-Marshal Malcolm Henderson from 20 July 1940 and throughout the Battle of Britain, before coming under the command of Air Vice-Marshal John D'Albiac from 10 February 1942. The Group was then under the command of Canadian flying ace Air Vice-Marshal Raymond Collishaw from 21 March 1942 until the Group was finally disbanded on 15 July 1943.

== Structure ==
May 1941

- No. 14 Group RAF
  - Group Headquarters: Inverness
    - RAF Castletown
      - No. 17 Squadron RAF operated with Hawker Hurricane single-seat fighter aircraft
      - No. 213 Squadron RAF operated with Hawker Hurricane single-seat fighter aircraft
    - RAF Dyce
      - No. 111 Squadron RAF (FIt) operated with Hawker Hurricane single-seat fighter aircraft
    - RAF Elgin
      - No. 232 Squadron RAF operated with Hawker Hurricane single-seat fighter aircraft
    - RAF Montrose
      - No. 111 Squadron RAF (FIt) operated with Hawker Hurricane single-seat fighter aircraft
    - RAF Skaebrae
      - No. 253 Squadron RAF operated with Hawker Hurricane single-seat fighter aircraft
    - RAF Skitten
      - No. 260 Squadron RAF operated with Hawker Hurricane single-seat fighter aircraft
    - RAF Sumburgh
      - No. 213 Squadron RAF (Flt) operated with Hawker Hurricane single-seat fighter aircraft

== Air Officers Commanding ==
Date	Air Officer Commanding
1 April 1918 – 19 May 1919	Lt.Col. Robert Cholerton Hayes, OBE
20 May 1919 – 19 January 1940	disbanded
20 Jan 1940 – 22 June 1940	Group Captain Philip F. Fullard
22 June 1940 – 25 June 1940	disbanded
26/29 June 1940 - 19 July 1940	Group Captain Philip F. Fullard
20 July 1940 – 9 February 1942	Air Vice-Marshal Malcolm Henderson
10 February 1942 – 20 March 1942	Air Vice-Marshal John D'Albiac
21 March 1942 – 15 July 1943	Air Vice-Marshal Raymond Collishaw

== See also ==
- List of Royal Air Force groups
- RAF Fighter Command
