= Hans Hoyer =

German flying ace

- Born: 20 September 1890; Rostock, Germany
- Died: 15 November 1917 (aged 27) near Zandvoorde, Belgium
- Military career
- Allegiance: Kingdom of Saxony, German Empire
- Branch: Artillery; aviation
- Rank: Leutnant
- Units: First Field Artillery Regiment; Twelfth Field Artillery Regiment; Flieger Abteilung 10/Feldflieger Abteilung 270; Jagdstaffel 36
- Awards: Knight's Cross of the Military Order of Saint Henry

Leutnant Hans Hoyer (20 September 1890 – 15 November 1917) was a German World War I soldier who was decorated as an artilleryman before turning to aviation. As a flyer, he became an ace credited with eight confirmed and three unconfirmed aerial victories before being killed in action while fighting.

== Early life and service ==
Hans Hoyer was born in Rostock on 20 September 1890; however he was Saxon. He performed his required military service in 1911, joining the First Field Artillery Regiment of the German Army. He rejoined for World War I, this time in the Kingdom of Saxony's Twelfth Field Artillery Regiment.

== World War I ==
Hoyer's valor while serving in field artillery won him the prestigious Knight's Cross of the Military Order of Saint Henry, awarded him on 30 November 1915.

He transferred to the Luftstreitkräfte in April 1916. By May 1916, he was operational with a two-seater unit, Flieger Abteilung 10, and stayed with them through their transition into Feldflieger Abteilung 270. In May 1917, he left the unit to attend Jastaschule. After being trained there as a fighter pilot, he joined Jasta 36 in late July under command of Walter von Bülow-Bothkamp. Hoyer would serve as acting Staffelführer from 4 August to 21 August 1917.

Flying against the Royal Flying Corps, Hoyer staked his first combat claim on 22 August 1917. By the time Bülow-Bothkamp took leave on 29 October, Hoyer's victory total stood at six confirmed and two unconfirmed. Bulow returned to command on 7 November, and Hoyer scored his eighth accredited victory the following day.

On 15 November 1917, Hoyer was on patrol flying an Albatros D.V. He was reported to have downed a Spad before being shot down and killed east of Zandvoorde, Belgium at 1215 hours. It is uncertain whether he fell to a Spad, or under the guns of Philip Fullard.

== List of aerial victories ==
See also Aerial victory standards of World War I

Confirmed victories are numbered and listed chronologically. Unconfirmed victories are denoted by "u/c" and may or may not be listed by date.

No.	Date/time	Aircraft	Foe	Result	Location	Notes
u/c	22 August 1917	Albatros D.III	Sopwith		Houthulst Forest, Belgium	
1	23 August 1917 @ 0835 hours	Albatros D.III	Bristol F.2 Fighter	Destroyed	Northeast of Zillebeke Lake, Belgium	Victim was from No. 22 Squadron RFC
2	3 September 1917 @ 1040 hours	Albatros D.III	Royal Aircraft Factory RE.8	Destroyed	West of Tenbrielen, Belgium	Victim was from No. 4 Squadron RFC
3	11 October 1917 @ 0830 hours	Albatros D.III	Royal Aircraft Factory SE.5a	Destroyed	Between Koelberg and Gheluvelt, Belgium	Victim was from No. 56 Squadron RFC
4	12 October 1917 @ 1215 hours	Albatros D.III	Sopwith Pup serial number B1830	Destroyed	Westrozebeke, Belgium	Victim was from No. 66 Squadron RFC
5	15 October 1917 @ 1510 hours	Albatros D.III	Bristol F.2b Fighter	Destroyed	Becelaere	Victim was from No. 20 Squadron RFC
u/c	18 October 1917	Albatros D.III	Bristol F.2b Fighter		Moorslede, Belgium	
6	24 October 1917 @ 1427 hours	Albatros D.III	Spad	Destroyed	South of Westroosebeke, Belgium	Victim was from No. 23 Squadron RFC
7	31 October 1917 @ 1610 hours	Albatros D.III	Royal Aircraft Factory SE.5a	Destroyed	Ketzelberg	Victim was from No. 84 Squadron RFC
8	8 November 1917 @ 1510 hours	Albatros	Royal Aircraft Factory SE.5a	Destroyed	Between Roeselare and Moorslede, Belgium	Victim was from No. 84 Squadron RFC
u/c	15 November 1917	Albatros	Spad		Zandvoorde, Belgium	

== Awards and decorations ==
- Knight's Cross of Military Order of Saint Henry
- 1914 Iron Cross, Second and First Class
