= Stanley Vincent =

Royal Air Force Air Vice-Marshal (1897-1976)

Air Vice Marshal Stanley Vincent CB, DFC, AFC, DL
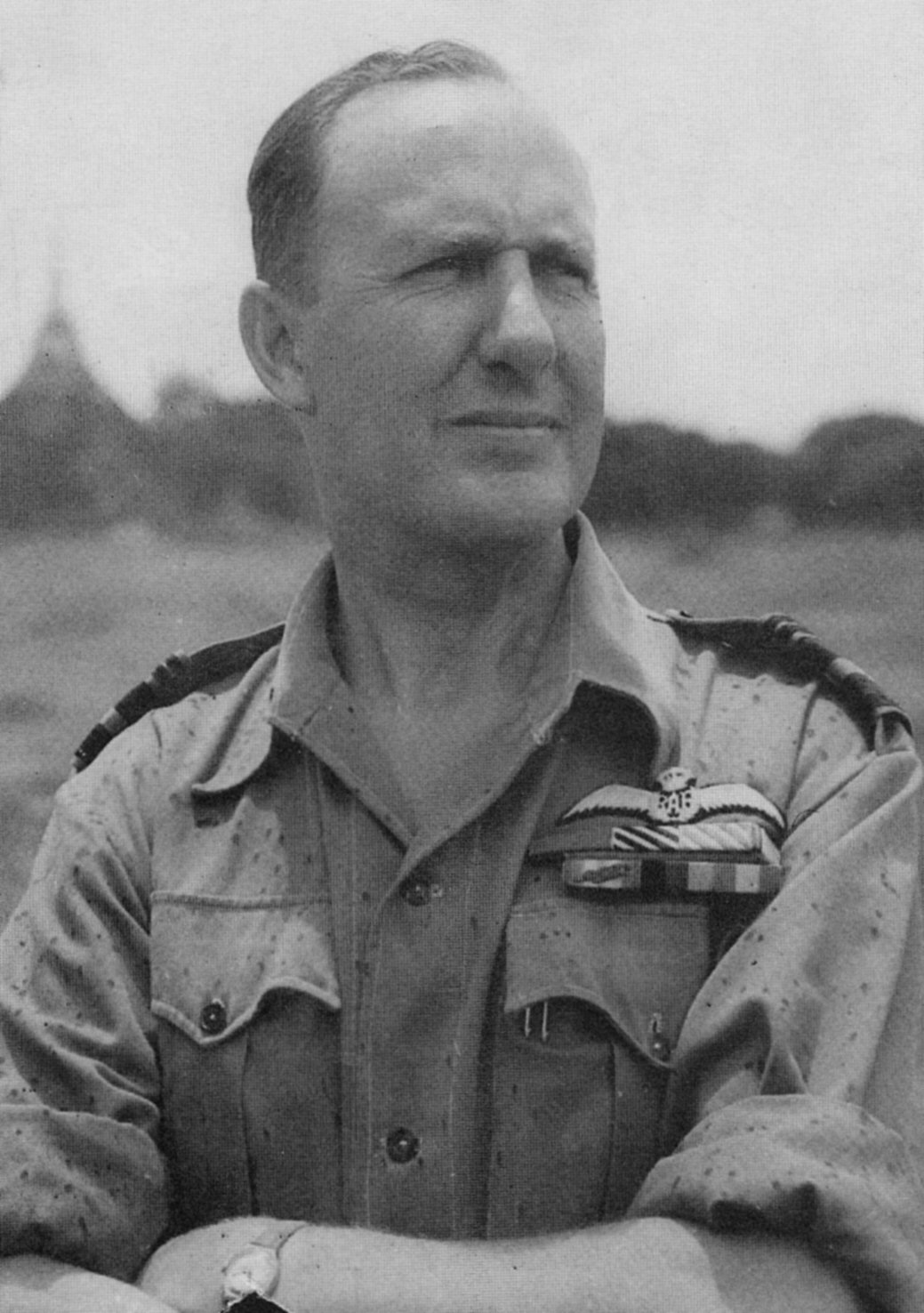
- Air Vice Marshal Vincent in 1945
- Born: 7 April 1897; Hampstead, London
- Died: 13 March 1976 (aged 78); Bury St Edmunds, Suffolk
- Military career
- Allegiance: United Kingdom
- Branch: British Army (1915–18); Royal Air Force (1918–50)
- Service years: 1915–1950
- Rank: Air Vice Marshal
- Commands: No. 11 (Fighter) Group (1948–50); No. 221 Group (1944–45); No. 13 (Fighter) Group (1943–44); No. 226 (Fighter) Group (1942); RAF North Weald (1941); RAF Northolt (1937, 1940–41); No. 84 Squadron (1933–35); No. 41 Squadron (1931–33)
- Conflicts: First World War; Second World War
- Awards: Companion of the Order of the Bath; Distinguished Flying Cross; Air Force Cross; Mentioned in Despatches; Commander of the Legion of Merit (United States)
- Other work: Eastern Area Commandant Royal Observer Corps (1954–65)

Air Vice Marshal Stanley Flamank Vincent, CB, DFC, AFC, DL (7 April 1897 – 13 March 1976) was a pilot in the Royal Flying Corps (RFC) and later a senior commander in the Royal Air Force (RAF). He was the only RFC/RAF pilot to shoot down enemy aircraft in both world wars.

== Early life ==
Stanley Vincent was born in Hampstead, north London, on 7 April 1897, the son of Dr Charles Vincent and Hannah Phillips. He was educated at Lancing College.

== Flying career ==
Vincent was commissioned into the Royal Flying Corps (RFC) after the completion of his training in 1915 at the Central Flying School, Upavon. His first posting was to No. 60 Squadron RAF in France in April 1916, equipped with Morane single seat and two seaters. Vincent was appointed to 'A' Flight equipped with the Morane Bullet scout. He claimed an LVG two-seater in July (the Squadron's first victory), another two seater in September and an Albatros two seater 'Out of control' in early 1917, by now flying the Nieuport 17. In March 1917 he returned to England with his commanding officer (CO), Major Smith-Barry, in order to open and establish the School of Special Flying at Gosport. In April 1917 Vincent crashed-landed and spent 7 months in hospital.

In November 1917 Vincent was given command of the newly formed No. 110 Squadron RAF. After handing command to the squadron's first CO, Major H R Nicholl, Vincent was posted to Shoreham and formed a Special Instructors' Flight at Shoreham. He was one of the first to be awarded the Air Force Cross in late 1918 and was promoted flight lieutenant in 1920. After the war, he was sent to France to bring back captured German machines and joined No 24 Squadron where he gave refresher courses to repatriated prisoners-of-war. He was also involved in the training of the Prince of Wales at this time. In August 1919 he was transferred to the Unemployed List but soon afterwards re-joined the RAF.

== Inter-war years ==
In 1921 he was appointed flight commander at the newly opened Royal Air Force College Cranwell. In 1923 he returned to operations in Iraq with No. 30 Squadron RAF. His overseas posting finished in 1928 and he travelled home in order to join No. 1 Squadron RAF at Tangmere. Promoted squadron leader in 1931, Vincent took command of No. 41 Squadron RAF at RAF Northolt and it was here that he was involved in the early experiments with Radio Telephony.

However he soon returned to Iraq to replace the CO of No. 80 Squadron RAF, who was taken ill and returned home. It was during this time that Vincent took part in the first reinforcement flight to Singapore. He too was taken ill at the end of 1934 and returned home. In June 1936 he was appointed as commanding officer of the Air Fighting Development Unit. In late 1936 he was promoted wing commander and was made Officer Commanding RAF Northolt.

== Second World War ==
After a brief period with the Air Ministry, followed by attendance at the Royal Naval College, Greenwich, he was promoted to group captain and in March 1940 returned to RAF Northolt where he commanded the station during the Battle of Britain.

Vincent often accompanied his station squadrons (usually 229 and 257 Squadrons) on scrambles and also flew lone 'station defence' sorties. He considered personally that he shot down 5 Do 17 enemy bombers on his various sorties. As he was alone on many of these sorties, confirmation has never been substantiated. He claimed a further two victories (over Bf 109s) on 30 September 1940. During one action he was wounded, crash landing at Kenley. He later had numerous pieces of shrapnel removed from his back, having narrowly missed his spine. He was awarded the Distinguished Flying Cross in 1940 in recognition of his skill and bravery.

In 1941 he was posted to RAF North Weald and, after a brief spell at RAF Biggin Hill, in June 1941 he moved to 11 Group as Group Captain (Operations) before a spell at RAF Fighter Command HQ. Promotion to Air Commodore followed in early 1942.

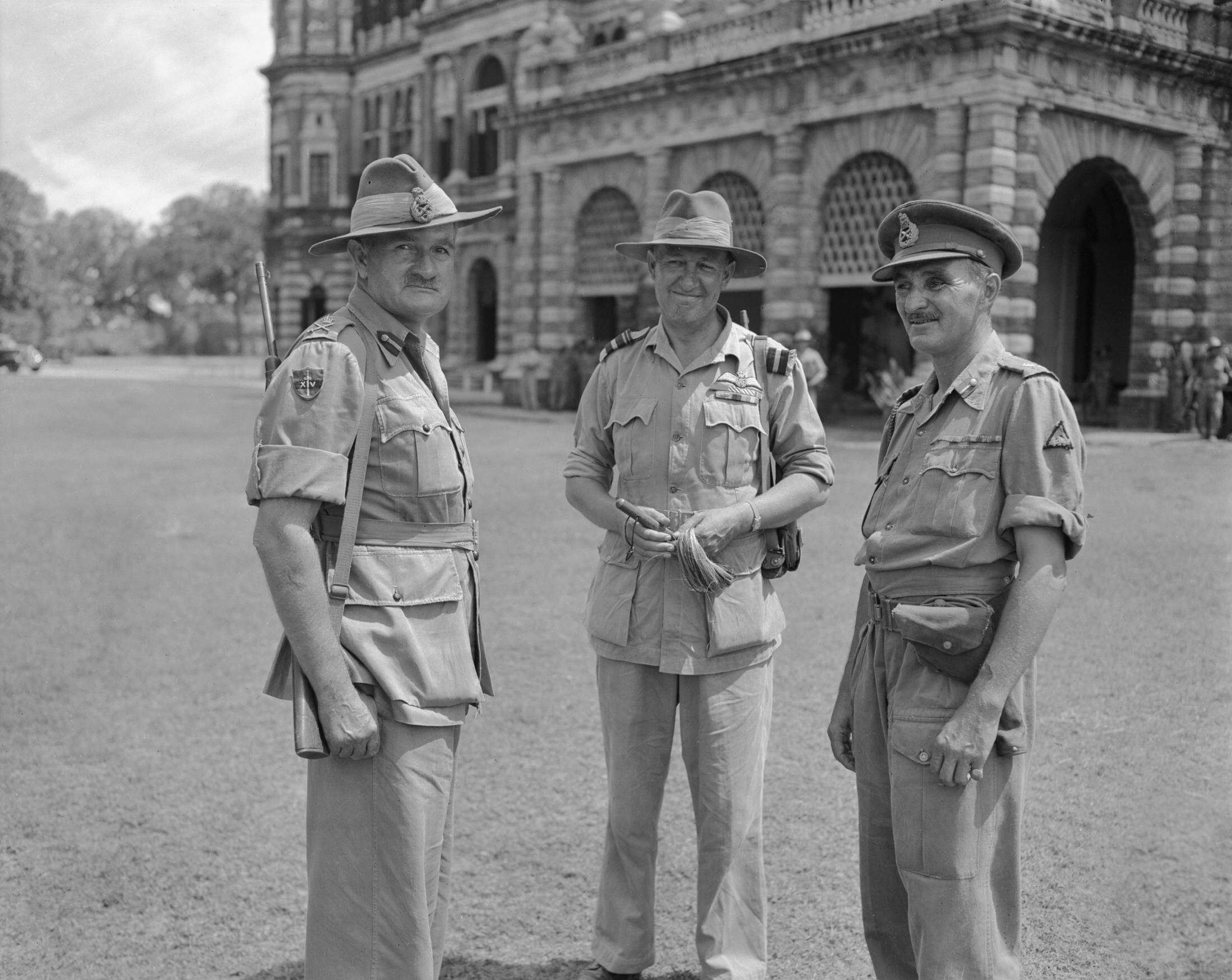
Lieutenant General Sir William Slim (GOC-in-Chief 14th Army, left), Air Vice Marshal Stanley Vincent (AOC 221 Group South East Asia Air Forces, centre) and Major General Henry Chambers (GOC 26th Indian Division, right) at Government House, Rangoon, 8 May 1945.

After he requested active duty, Vincent was sent to assist with the defence of Singapore and the Dutch East Indies Campaign. In February 1942 he took command of the combined Commonwealth fighter formation, No. 226 Group, which had only two Hurricane squadrons, along with the remnants of Brewster Buffalo units, at Palembang, Sumatra. Outnumbered and poorly-equipped Commonwealth and Dutch units fought a losing battle against overwhelming enemy forces and in March, Vincent was evacuated to Australia, where he advised on air defence systems. He was then appointed Deputy Chief of the Air Staff by the Royal New Zealand Air Force, a post he held for nine months.

He returned to England in mid-1943 and to RAF Fighter Command Operations Room, after which he was dispatched to Scotland and the command of No. 13 Group. He was also designated Air Officer Commanding of the planned invasion of Norway. When this failed to materialise he travelled back to the Far East and command of No. 221 Group (South East Asia Air Forces, Burma) where he provided aerial support for the 14th Army.

He remained in Asia until the end of the war and, on the day of the victory parade, was invalided home with dysentery.

== Post-war ==
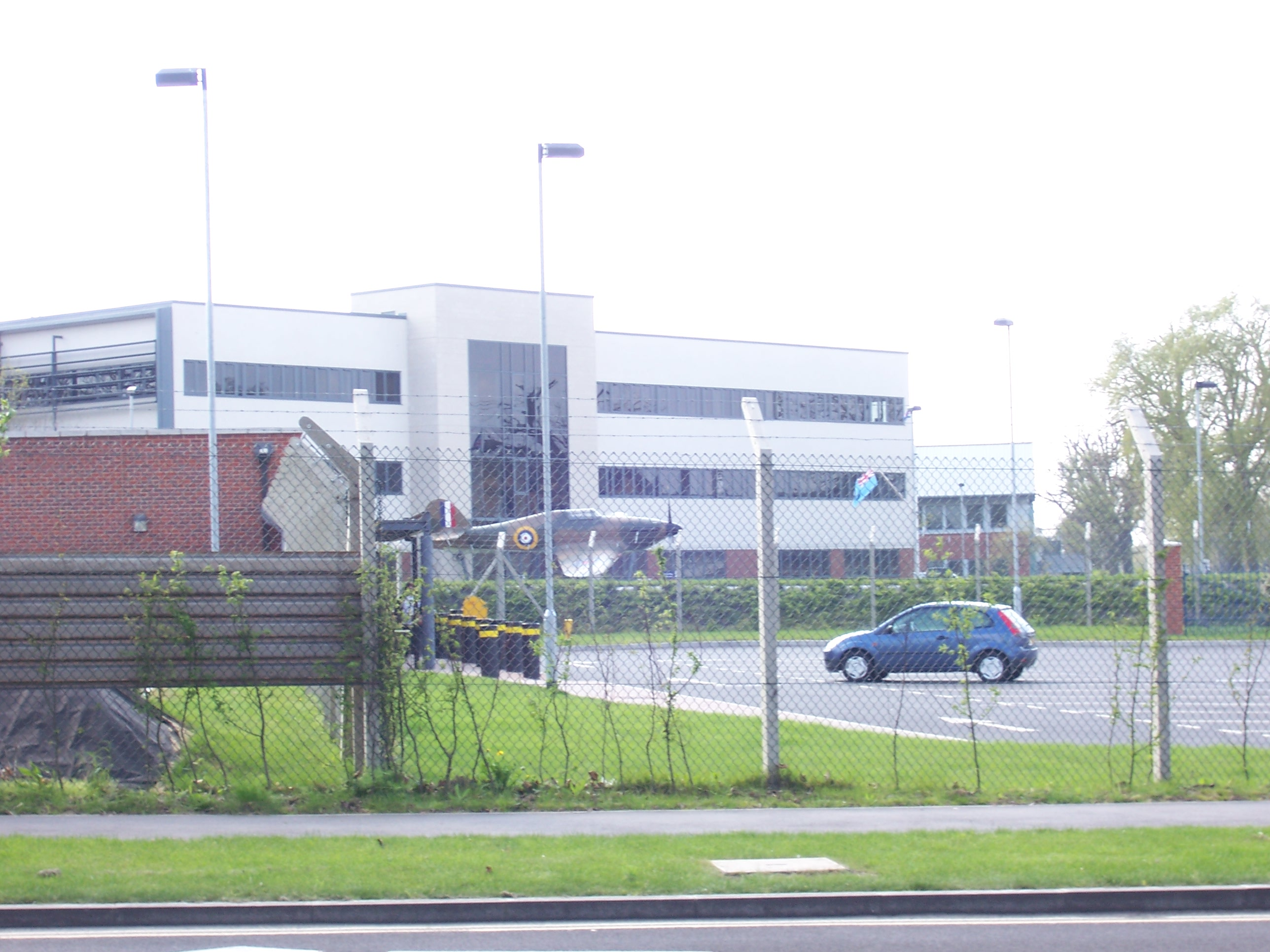
RAF Northolt gate guardian in the colours of Stanley Vincent's Hurricane

He was promoted acting air vice marshal in 1944, which was made substantive in 1947. Between 1945 and 1948 he held the position of Senior Air Staff Officer, RAF Fighter Command. From 1948 he commanded No. 11 Group before requesting retirement in 1950. After retirement he served as Commandant for the Eastern Area, Royal Observer Corps (1954–1965) in the rank of Observer Captain. He published his autobiography, Flying Fever in 1972 and died in 1976.

On 15 September 2010, a replica Hawker Hurricane gate guardian in the colours of Vincent's aircraft was unveiled at RAF Northolt.

== Publications ==
- Flying fever (Jarrolds, London, 1972)

== See also ==
- Harry von Bülow-Bothkamp
- Otto Höhne
- Erich Mix
- Theo Osterkamp
- Marcel Haegelen

Military offices
New title	AOC No. 226 Group; 1942–1943	Vacant Title next held by Leslie Iles
Preceded by Malcolm Henderson	AOC No. 13 Group; 1943–1944	Succeeded by John Boret
Preceded by Herbert Rowley	AOC No. 221 Group; 1944–1945	Succeeded by Cecil Bouchier
Preceded by Somerled Macdonald	AOC No. 11 Group; 1948–1950	Succeeded by Thomas Pike
