= Malcolm Henderson (RAF officer) =

Royal Air Force Air Vice-Marshal (1891-1978)

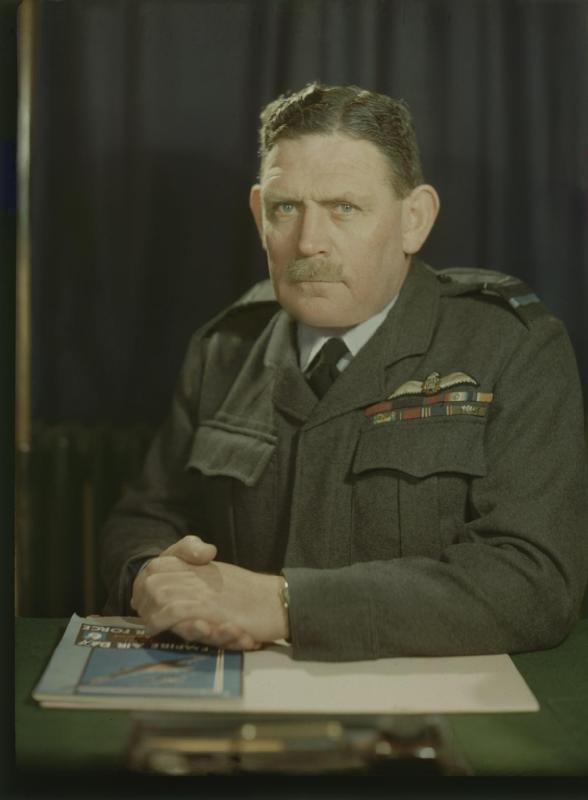
- Born: 1 June 1891
- Died: 7 March 1978 (aged 86)
- Military career
- Allegiance: United Kingdom
- Branch: British Army (1909–18); Royal Air Force (1918–45)
- Service years: 1909–45
- Rank: Air Vice Marshal
- Commands: No. 12 Group (1943–44); No. 13 Group (1942–43); No. 14 Group (1940–42); No. 47 Squadron (1922–26); No. 216 Squadron (1921–22)
- Conflicts: First World War; Second World War
- Awards: Companion of the Order of the Bath; Companion of the Order of the Indian Empire; Commander of the Order of the British Empire; Distinguished Service Order; Mentioned in Despatches; Croix de guerre (France)

Air Vice Marshal Malcolm Henderson, CB, CIE, CBE, DSO (1 June 1891 – 7 March 1978) was a Royal Flying Corps pilot during the First World War and a senior commander in the Royal Air Force during the Second World War.

Henderson began the First World War as an army private, in the London Scottish battalion, but was commissioned into the Seaforth Highlanders in 1915 and seconded to the Royal Flying Corps. In 1916 he was awarded the Distinguished Service Order. The citation read:

Second Lieutenant (temporary Lieutenant) Malcolm Henderson, 4th (Ross Highland) Battalion, Seaforth Highlanders (Ross-shire Buffs, The Duke of Albany's), Territorial Force, and Royal Flying Corps. For conspicuous gallantry when, on photographic reconnaissance, his machine was struck by a shell from an enemy anti-aircraft gun. The shell passed through the nacelle of the machine, and took off his left leg just below the knee. In spite of this he succeeded in coming down from 7,000 feet, and landing 3,000 yards behind our line, thus saving his aeroplane and the life of the Observer.

Later that year the French government awarded him the Croix de guerre.

In the 1920s he spent some years in Egypt, commanding first 216 Squadron (with Airco DH.10 Amiens aircraft) and then No. 47 Squadron (with DH.9As).

He was Air Officer Commanding No. 14 (Fighter) Group during the Battle of Britain.

Military offices
Preceded by Air Vice Marshal Roderic Hill	Air Officer Commanding No. 12 Group; 1943–1944	Succeeded by Air Vice Marshal John Baker
Preceded by Air Vice Marshal John Oliver Andrews	Air Officer Commanding No. 13 Group; 1942–1943	Succeeded by Air Vice Marshal Stanley Vincent
Preceded by Group Captain Philip F. Fullard	Air Officer Commanding No. 14 Group; 1940–1942	Succeeded by Air Vice Marshal John D'Albiac
