= Frontier Light Horse =

British South African cavalry unit

The Frontier Light Horse, a mounted unit of 200 volunteers, was raised at King William's Town, Eastern Cape Colony in 1877 by Lieutenant Frederick Carrington.

It is often referred to as the Cape Frontier Light Horse and served under Brevet Lieutenant-Colonel Henry Burmester Pulleine.

== Military service ==
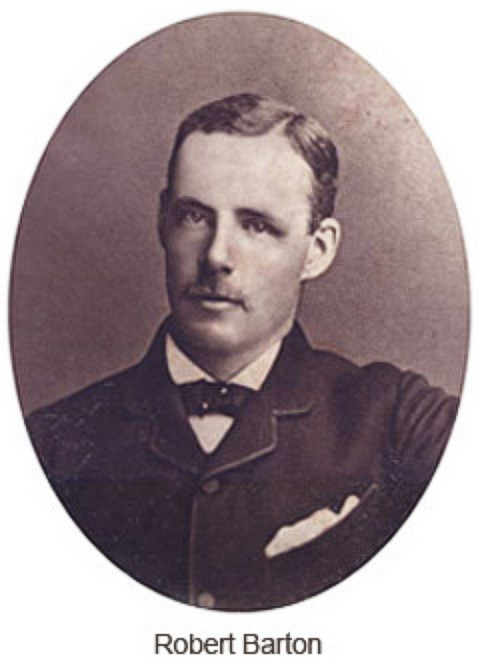
The commanding officer, Captain Robert Johnston Barton, killed at the Battle of Hlobane on 28 March 1879

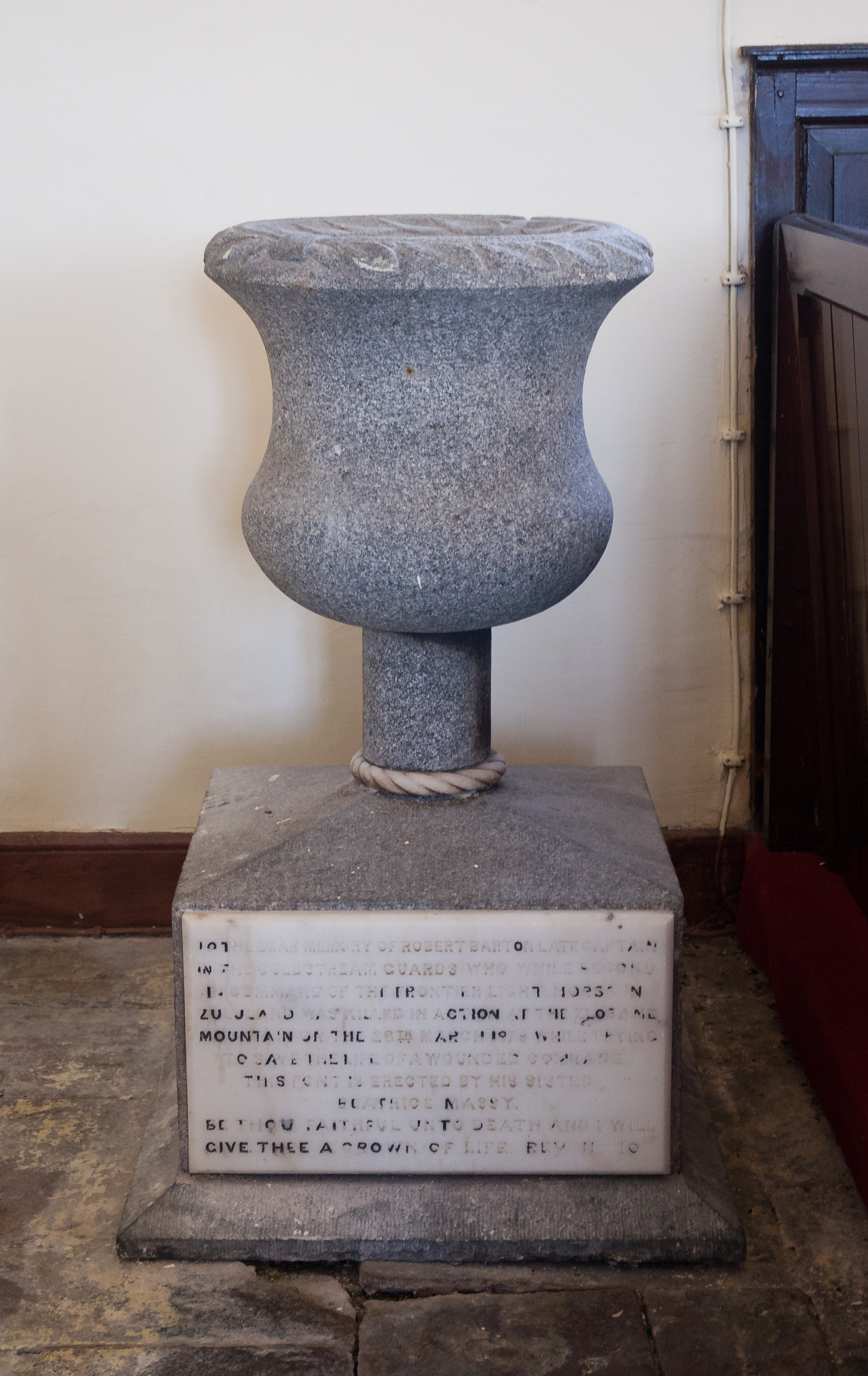
Baptismal font dedicated to the memory of Captain Barton in Fethard, County Tipperary

The unit served in the 9th Frontier War under Major Redvers Buller. In July 1878 the unit of 276 officers and men marched from King William's Town to Pietermaritzburg and then to Sekhukhuneland for service there.

They fought under Captain Robert Johnston Barton in Wood's Column during the Anglo-Zulu War. They acted as rearguard at Hlobane on 28 March 1879 where 20% of the 156 members were lost. Captain Barton, the commanding officer was killed. They then served in the battle of Khambula on the next day and took part in the forward advance of their column into Zululand; present in the battle of Ulundi on 4 July 1879. At the end of that year the unit was disbanded.

== Victoria Cross ==
Two members of the Frontier Light Horse, Captain Cecil D'Arcy and Sergeant Edmund O'Toole were awarded the Victoria Cross for their acts of valour in endeavouring to save the lives of soldiers during the reconnaissance made before the Battle of Ulundi on 3 July 1879.

== Other units ==
The name Frontier Light Horse was also applied to an Eastern Cape Province unit established in 1899 as the District Mounted Rifles. Designated Frontier Light Horse in 1900, it served in the Colonial Division during the Second Anglo-Boer War.

== Medal Roll 1877-8-9 ==
Dutton in 2010 prepared a Zulu and Basuto Wars Medal Roll.

== Noteworthy members ==
- Corporal William Smith, born at Eydon, Northamptonshire, enlisted in the 12th Regiment of Foot at Weedon, Buckinghamshire in 1848. He survived the wreck of HM Troopship Birkenhead in 1852 and served in the Frontier Light Horse in the Anglo-Zulu War of 1879.
- Corporal George Ashby, born at Greenwich, Kent. In Pulleine's Rangers in the Frontier Light Horse, Baker's Light Horse. In an interview with the South Australian Register newspaper of Adelaide, South Australia, dated 2 June 1917, Trooper George Ashby's experiences were reported in full:

Soon afterwards came the most exciting incident in Cpl. Ashby's career. The force he was attached to was ordered to capture Umbeline's stronghold, on the top of Zhlobane Mountain. They were 500 strong, and in charge of Col. Weatherly. The only chance of reaching the summit was by scaling a narrow pass. The Zulus, armed with rifles and assegais, fought bard to prevent the British force reaching the top. but by making the attack at day break, the latter, in the face of tremendous obstacles, attained their object. A rapid breakfast was being partaken, when it was discovered that the mountain was surrounded by a vast horde of Zulus. An attempt was made to descend on the side opposite to the pass. Cpl Ashby and his little party endeavoured to fight their way down, and at last he and a man named Andrew Gemmell, now living in New Zealand, were the only ones left. With their faces to the foe, firing as they retired, they kept the Zulus at bay. Then an unfortunate thing happened, Cpl. Ashby's rifle burst, but, fortunately for him, Col. Buller, afterwards Sir Redvers Buller, who was one of the, party, came galloping by, and offered to take him up behind him. Col. Buller was a heavy man, and his horse was a light one, and realizing this, Cpl. Ashby declined his generous offer. But the Colonel stayed with him, and, Cpl. Ashby having picked up a rifle and ammunition from a fallen comrade, the two men retired, firing whenever a foeman showed himself. They eventually reached the main camp, and for this service, as well as for saving the lives of two fellow-officers on the same occasion, Col. Buller received the Victoria Cross. Out of 500 men who made the attack on the Zhlobane Mountain, more than, 300 met their death. The next day the battle of Campbell's Hill was fought, and shortly afterwards the battle of Ulundi took place, when the British force, under Lord Chelmsford, inflicted a terrible defeat on the enemy. This was Cpl. Ashby's last fight. Within 12 days Cetewayo was captured and the war was over. Cpl. Ashby subsequently came to Australia.

== Killed in Action ==
BAKER'S HORSE

Troopers. Killed in Action at Inhlobane, 28 March 1879

- John Campbell
- M. Christianson
- J. Darwin
- R. David
- W. Dubar
- PG. Rossam
- W. Van Niekerk
- W. Walters
- C. Ward

FRONTIER LIGHT HORSE

- 250 Sergeant J. Tippett - killed in action at Kambula 29 March 1879

Troopers. Killed in Action at Inhlobane, 28 March 1879

- 251 A.J. Burton
- 288 P.W. Caffin
- 367 W. Cherry
- 228 A.W. Dobson
- 83 G. Dodwell
- 227 A.W. Dobson
- 247 W. Gordon
- 177 J. Grills
- 112 T. Halliday
- 24 J. Hasseldine
- 200 H. Helwig
- 332 E. Higgins
- 113 G. Horn
- 87 J. Kerween
- 317 W.H. Livingstone
- 295 C. Lyndon
- 266 J. May
- 312 C. Merk
- 369 G. Pearce
- 57 H. Plante
- 296 M. Prendergast
- 248 W.A. Rogan
- 375 J.A. Roubenhamer - killed in action near Ulundi 3 July 1879
- 16 H. Runciman
- 311 A. Schermal
- 279 G. Seymour
- 214 L. Shearer
- 236 W. Tirrill
- 273 G. Williams
