= Alfred Hübner =

Albert Hübner
- Born: 26 October 1891; Lauenburg, German Empire
- Died: Unknown
- Military career
- Allegiance: Germany
- Branch: Aviation
- Rank: Vizefeldwebel
- Unit: Jagdstaffel 36
- Awards: Iron Cross

Vizefeldwebel Alfred Hübner (born 26 October 1891, date of death unknown) was a World War I flying ace credited with six aerial victories.

== Early life and service ==
Alfred Hübner was born on 26 October 1891 in Lauenburg, German Empire. He joined Infantry Regiment Nr. 14 of the German Army as a Gefreiter on 11 October 1912. He continued to serve as World War I erupted, and was promoted to Unteroffizier on 30 September 1915 before transferring to the Luftstreitkräfte.

== Aerial service ==
- See also Aerial victory standards of World War I

On 3 April 1917, Hübner began aviation training at Fliegerersatz-Abteilung (Replacement Detachment) 3 at Gotha. Upon completion of this phase of training, he was assigned to a unit flying two-seater craft. On 18 November 1917, he reported to Jastaschule (Fighter school) I for further training.

On 14 February 1918, Hübner was posted as a pilot to a fighter squadron, Royal Prussian Jagdstaffel 36. Promotions, victories, and honors would come to him in this squadron. On 5 March 1918, he was promoted to Sergeant. At 0800 hours on 27 March, he shot down an Airco DH.4 from No. 25 Squadron RAF over Aveluy Wood for his first aerial victory. This was approximately when he was awarded the Second Class Iron Cross, though the exact date is unknown.

On 25 April 1918, his throat was grazed by an enemy bullet, but he remained on duty. He shot down a SPAD from Escadrille 62 on 2 June 1918 over Beaumetz. On 12 July, he was awarded the First Class Iron Cross; three days later, he was promoted to Vizefeldwebel. Again, he was slightly wounded, but continued on duty.

Hübner shot down a SE.5a each on 3 and 4 September 1918. The 3 September one fell over Aubencheul, France; the other SE.5a, from 64 Squadron, was caught over Mercatel, France. On 4 October, he was credited with the destruction of another SE.5a, this one from 85 Squadron, at Le Catelet, France. At 1010 hours on 30 October 1918, Hübner shot down an 88 Squadron Bristol F.2b Fighter over Tournai, Belgium for his sixth and final victory. Alfred Hübner would fight through war's end with no further success before disappearing into obscurity.
