= Walter von Bülow-Bothkamp =

German ace fighter

- Walter von Bülow-Bothkamp as Braunschweig Hussar in 1914
- Born: 24 April 1894; Borby, Kingdom of Prussia
- Died: 6 January 1918 (aged 23) near Ypres, Belgium
- Burial place: Family chateau
- Relatives: Harry Kurt Ernst von Bülow-Bothkamp; Conrad Gustav von Bülow-Bothkamp; Friedrich Conrad Eugen von Bülow-Bothkamp
- Military career
- Allegiance: German Empire
- Branch: Hussars Regiment 17; Luftstreitkräfte
- Service years: 1914–1918
- Rank: Leutnant (Lieutenant)
- Units: Hussars Regiment 17; Flieger-Abteilung 22; Flieger-Abteilung 300; Jagdstaffel 18; Jagdstaffel 36; Jagdstaffel 2
- Commands: Jagdstaffel 36; Jagdstaffel 2
- Awards: Pour le Merite; Military Order of Saint Henry; Iron Cross

Walter Kuno Reinhold Gustav von Bülow-Bothkamp (alternatively spelled Bothcamp; 24 April 1894 - 6 January 1918) was a German fighter ace from an aristocratic family who was credited with 28 victories. After entering World War I as a hussar, he transferred to the Imperial German Air Service. He was a recipient of the Pour le Merite, Prussia's highest award for valor, as well as the Knight's Cross of the Military Order of Saint Henry, Saxony's highest award for valor. On 6 January 1918, he was killed in action.

== Early life and family ==
Walter von Bülow-Bothkamp was born at Borby, now a part of Eckernförde in Schleswig-Holstein, Germany. He was the second eldest of four brothers, all of whom would serve their country during World War I, with three of them dying in service. Friedrich (1885-1914) and Walter (1894-1918) were killed in action and Conrad (1895-1918) died in a flying accident. Only Harry (1897-1976) survived the war; he later served as an Oberst in the Luftwaffe in World War II.

Walter von Bülow-Bothkamp graduated from the Baccalaureate High School in Plön, Schleswig-Holstein in 1912. He then traveled for six months in Great Britain and Switzerland. After his Wanderjahr he settled in to study law at the University of Heidelberg. He also joined a student corps there.

In August 1914, he and his younger brother Conrad joined the 17th Brunswick Hussar Regiment (Braunschweigisches Husaren-Regiment Nr. 17), one of several Prussian hussar regiments which used a skull and crossbones symbol and were known as "Death's Head Hussars." In January 1915, he accompanied his unit to the front in southern Alsace.

== Early Flying Service ==
Walter von Bülow-Bothkamp was commissioned as a Leutnant (lieutenant) in April 1915 and applied for pilot's training in the Luftstreitkräfte (Imperial German Air Service). Along with his brother Conrad, he trained in Replacement Division 5 in Hanover through 15 September 1915.

Bülow-Bothkamp was originally posted to Feldflieger Abteilung 22, which was an aviation squadron organized for aerial reconnaissance, observation, and direction of artillery on the Western Front. Although flying an AEG G.II two-seated observation plane, he managed to down enemy two seaters on consecutive days, 10 and 11 October 1915.

After an award of the Iron Cross First Class for his victories in October, his transfer to Flieger-Abteilung 300 took him to the Middle East to continue his reconnaissance duties in support of a German ally, the Ottoman Empire. He flew on the Palestinian front and was wounded on 13 June 1916. In a letter home from the hospital in Jerusalem, he joked about his shoulder wound being as inconsequential as a dueling scar suffered at university.

After his discharge from hospital, he won twice more near El Arish, with a fifth victory unconfirmed.

He earned a transfer to piloting fighter planes. He left Flieger-Abteilung 300 and joined a Prussian fighter squadron on the Western Front, Jagdstaffel 18. Bülow-Bothkamp shot down two enemy aircraft on 23 January 1917 and another the following day, to start his and his squadron's victory roll. By 10 May, when he transferred out of Jagdstaffel 18, his total stood at 13. He had been awarded both the Royal House Order of Hohenzollern and the Kingdom of Saxony's Military Order of Saint Henry while with the squadron.

== Appointed to Leadership ==
He was then appointed Commanding Officer of Jagdstaffel 36. He promptly shot down two French observation balloons at Bouvancourt on 21 May 1917. A hip wound kept him from scoring for a while, before he began a steady accumulation of triumphs that would extend from 6 July to 2 December. During this stretch, on 8 October, after 21 victories, he was awarded the highest decoration of both Prussia and the German Empire, the Pour le Merite. On 29 October, he went on leave until 7 November, leaving Hans Hoyer in temporary command of the squadron.

On 2 December, he killed Lieutenant Harry G. E. Luchford of No. 20 Squadron RAF when he shot down his Bristol F.2 Fighter. This was Bülow-Bothkamp's 28th and final victory.

On 13 December 1917, he was transferred to being Commanding Officer of a more prestigious unit, Jagdstaffel 2, Oswald Boelcke's old unit. On 6 January 1918, Walter von Bülow-Bothkamp led his wingmen into a dogfight against No. 23 and No. 70 Squadrons of the Royal Flying Corps near Ypres. He did not survive. RFC aces Captain Frank G. Quigley and Captain William M. Fry are believed to be his conquerors.

Walter was buried in his family chateau's cemetery. He joined his brother Friedrich, killed in action in 1914. Within the year, Conrad would join them.

== Decorations and awards ==
- Kingdom of Prussia:
  - Pour le Merite (8 October 1917)
  - Royal House Order of Hohenzollern, Knight's Cross with Swords
  - Iron Cross 1st class (October 1915) and 2nd class (April 1915)
- Grand Duchy of Mecklenburg-Schwerin: Military Merit Cross 2nd Class
- Kingdom of Saxony: Military Order of Saint Henry, Knight's Cross
- Austria-Hungary: Military Merit Cross, 3rd Class with War Decoration
- Ottoman Empire: War Medal (Harp Madalyası) (1916 during service in Palestine)

As an officer of a Brunswick regiment and recipient of the Iron Cross, he would likely also have been awarded the duchy's War Merit Cross, but most of the records of that award were lost.
