= Jagdstaffel 53 =

Jasta 53
- Active: 1917–1918
- Country: German Empire
- Branch: Luftstreitkräfte
- Type: Fighter squadron
- Engagements: World War I

Royal Prussian Jagdstaffel 53, commonly abbreviated to Jasta 53, was a "hunting group" (i.e., fighter squadron) of the Luftstreitkräfte, the air arm of the Imperial German Army during World War I. The squadron would score over 20 aerial victories during the war. The unit's victories came at the expense of one pilot killed in a flying accident, another injured in an accident, one wounded in action, and four taken prisoner of war.

== History ==
Jasta 53 was founded on 27 December 1917 at Flieger-Abteilung (Flier Detachment) 9, Darmstadt, Germany. It began operations on 9 January 1918. However, the new squadron did not fly its first combat missions until 10 March 1918. On 22 March 1918, they scored their first three aerial victories.

== Commanding officers (Staffelführer) ==
- Theodor Quandt: 27 December 1917 – 23 August 1918
- Robert Hildebrand: 23 August 1918

== Duty stations ==
- Attigny, France: 10 January 1918
- Mont-d'Origny: 18 March 1918
- Flavy-le-Martel, France
- Moyencourt, France
- Mars-sous-Bourcq, France: 15 July 1918
- Chuffilly-Roche, France
- Malmy
- Antrecourt

== Aircraft ==
- Albatros D.Vas
- Pfalz D.III
- Some Pfalz D.XIIs
- Fokker Dr.I triplanes
- Fokker D.VIIs

== Operations ==
On 10 January 1918, Jasta 53 was posted to 3 Armee. On 18 March, it was transferred to 18 Armee. On 15 July 1918, Jasta 53 returned to 3 Armee control. It joined Jagdgruppe 11 at this time; JG 11 moved to support 9 Armee a few days later. On 25 September 1918, Jasta 53 returned to support of 3 Armee until war's end.
