= Hans Gottfried von Häbler =

- Born: 17 May 1895; Großschönau, Saxony, German Empire
- Died: 22 March 1918 (aged 22); Vicinity of Bapaume, France
- Military career
- Allegiance: Germany
- Branch: Infantry; aviation
- Service years: 1913 - 1918
- Rank: Leutnant
- Units: Infantry; Flieger-Abteilung (Artillerie) (Flier Detachment (Artillery)) 273; Jagdstaffel 36 (Fighter Squadron 36)
- Awards: Royal House Order of Hohenzollern; Iron Cross

Leutnant Hans Gottfried von Häbler (actually Haebler) was a World War I flying ace credited with eight aerial victories.

On 17 May 1895, von Häbler was born in Großschonau in the Kingdom of Saxony, German Empire. He enlisted in the 1st Royal Saxon Guards Heavy Cavalry on 1 October 1913 as a one-year volunteer. He served with the cavalry for the first two years of World War I before volunteering for aviation duty of the Luftstreitkräfte in the autumn of 1916. He trained at Fliegerersatz-Abteilung (Replacement Detachment) 9 before going operational with Flieger-Abteilung (Artillerie) Flier Detachment (Artillery) 273.

Von Häbler received further training on single-seat fighters at Jastaschule 1, then joined Jagdstaffel 36 on 30 September 1917. He scored his first aerial victory on 7 October 1917; on 18 March 1918, he scored his eighth confirmed victory. On 22 March, while flying Fokker Triplane number 509/17, he engaged and bested a Sopwith Camel over Metz-en-Couture, though the victory went unconfirmed. He was subsequently hit by anti-aircraft fire. His triplane fell virtually undamaged behind British lines near Havrincourt. Trying to set his plane on fire, he was shot upon by British troops who had arrived at the scene. Hans Gottfried von Häbler died of his wounds on the same day in a field hospital near Bapaume while in British captivity.

== Honors and awards ==
- Iron Cross, II. and I. Class
- Saxony's Order of Albert, Knight's Cross II. Class with swords
- Prussian Military Pilot Badge
- Ehrenbecher für den Sieger im Luftkampf
- Civil Order of Saxony, Knight's Cross II. Class with swords
- Kingdom of Saxony's Knight's Cross of the Military Order of Saint Henry: Awarded 2 October 1917
- Knight's Cross of the Royal House Order of Hohenzollern
