= Jagdstaffel 36 =

Jasta 36
- Active: 1917–1918
- Country: German Empire
- Branch: Luftstreitkräfte
- Type: Fighter squadron
- Engagements: World War I

Royal Prussian Jagdstaffel 36, commonly abbreviated to Jasta 36, was a "hunting group" (i.e., fighter squadron) of the Luftstreitkräfte, the air arm of the Imperial German Army during World War I. The unit would score 123 confirmed aerial victories during the war, including 11 enemy observation balloons. In turn, they would suffer 13 killed in action, 15 wounded in action, two injured in flying accidents, and two taken prisoner of war.

== Operational history ==
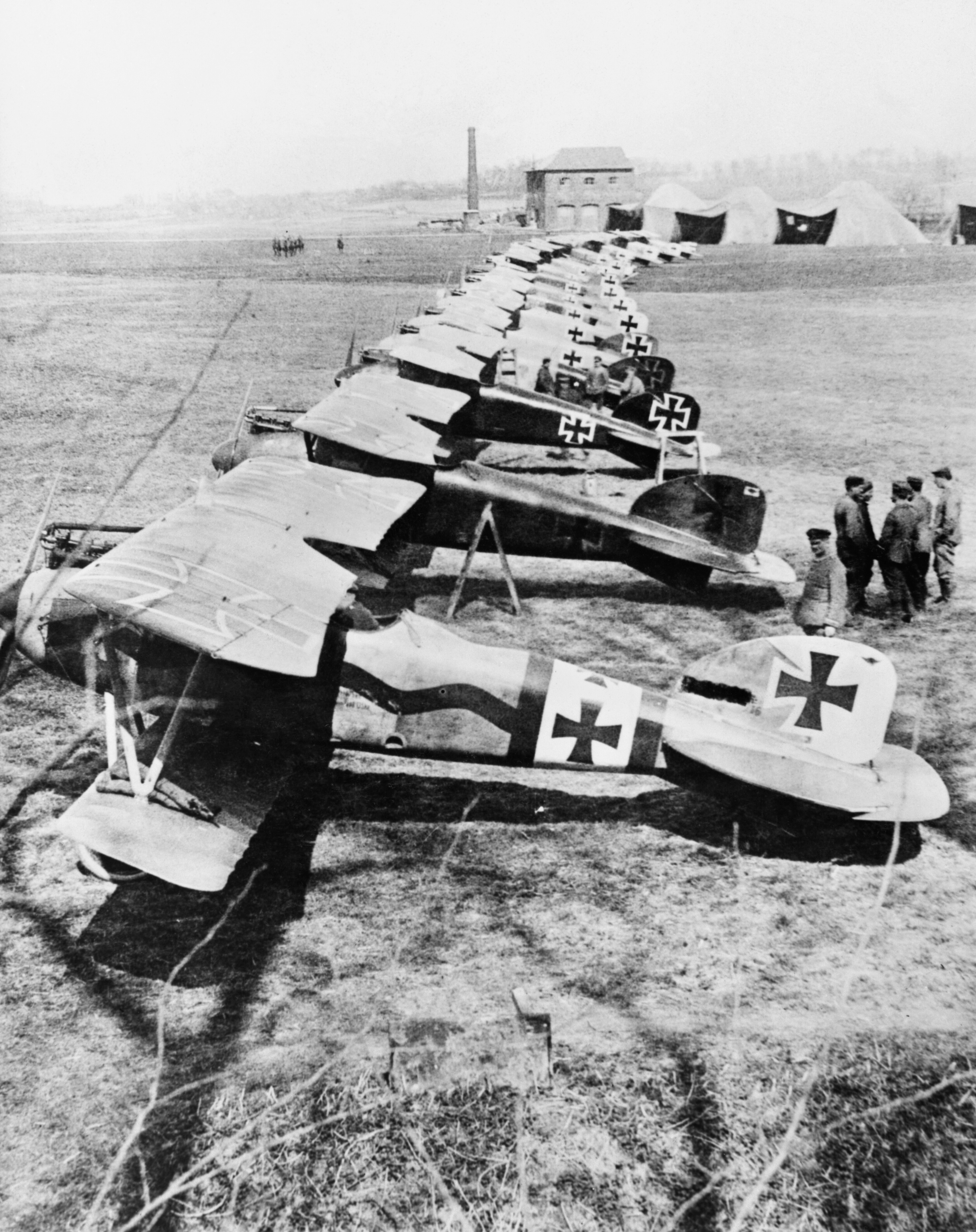
A lineup of Albatros D.III fighters. Jasta 36 began with D.IIIs.

Royal Prussian Jagdstaffel 36 was founded on 11 January 1917; however, it did not organize until 21 February. It began at FEA 13, Breslau, with its first commanding officer, Albert Dossenbach, assigned the following day. The new squadron began its operational history supporting 1 Armee from Le Châtelet. Le Chatelet took two weeks hectic construction to equip it as an airfield.

It scored its first victory on 5 April 1917; coincidentally, it was Dossenbach's tenth. Spurred by his example, Jasta 36 pilots began to score; by April's end, the unit's victories totaled 13 French aircraft. Heinrich Bongartz added to that two observation balloons set aflame, for a grand total of 15 victories. However, on 2 May the jasta would lose its commander, when Dossenbach was wounded in a retaliatory bombing raid by the French.

On 18 or 19 June 1917, Jasta 36 changed to support 4 Armee from Sailly. Six days later, it moved to Markebeke to oppose the British Royal Flying Corps. The squadron flew against the British during latter 1917. On 27 November, the unit's war diary reported the squadron's 77th victory. By year's end, the number had risen to 87.

During January 1918, the jasta received a number of new Fokker Dr.I triplanes. On 14 February 1918, Jasta 36 joined Jasta 2, Jasta 26, and Jasta 27 in Jagdgeschwader III (JG III); the newly created fighter wing was commanded by Bruno Loerzer. In March 1918, when it moved to Erchin, it supported 17 Armee. On 14 April, it returned to control of 4 Armee. On 23 May 1918, it began supporting 7 Armee from Vivaise. On 25 August 1918, it took up its final role of the war, supporting 17 Armee again from Emerchicourt. Although it would change bases another half dozen times, it ended the war in this role.

== Commanding officers (Staffelführer) ==
1. Albert Dossenbach: transferred in from Jasta Boelcke on 22 February – 2 June 1917 (WIA)
2. Walter von Bülow-Bothkamp: transferred in from Jasta 18 on 2 June 1917 – transferred out on 13 December 1917
3. Heinrich Bongartz: 19 June 1917 – 29 April 1918 (WIA)
4. Richard Plange: transferred in from Jasta 2 on 29 April 1918 – 19 May 1918 (KIA)
5. Harry von Bulow-Bothkamp: 19 May 1918 – transferred on 14 August 1918
6. Theodor Quandt: 14 August 1918 until disbandment

== Aerodromes ==
1. Breslau: 21 February – 1 March 1917
2. Le Châtelet, France: 1 March 1917 – 4 May 1917
3. Saint Loup: 4 May 1917 – 19 June 1917
4. Sailly, France: 18 June 1917 – 24 June 1917
5. Markebeke: 24 June 1917 - unknown date of movement
6. Kuerne: unknown duration
7. Houplin-Ancoisne: unknown duration
8. Erchin, France: March 1918 – 14 April 1918
9. Halluin, France: 14 April 1918 – 23 May 1918
10. Vivaise, France: 23 May 1918 – unknown date of movement
11. Epitaphe Ferme: unknown duration
12. Vauxcere, France: unknown duration
13. Ercheu, France: unknown duration
14. Chambry, France: unknown date of movement – 25 August 1918
15. Émerchicourt, France: 25 August 1918 – unknown date of movement
16. Aniche, France: unknown duration
17. Lieu-Saint-Amand, France: unknown duration
18. Saultain, France: unknown duration
19. Lenz: unknown duration
20. Lirm: unknown duration

== Notable personnel ==
- Albert Dossenbach, the squadron's first commander, won a Military Merit Cross while an enlisted man; he later won its equivalent again as an officer, when he was awarded the Pour le Mérite ("Blue Max"), as well as earning the House Order of Hohenzollern and the Iron Cross.
- Another of the unit's Staffelnführer, Walter von Bülow-Bothkamp, also won the Blue Max, as well as the Military Order of Saint Henry and the Iron Cross.
- His brother Harry von Bülow-Bothkamp, another of the unit's commanders, won the Hohenzollern and Iron Cross, as did Hans von Häbler and Walter Böning.
- Hans Hoyer was awarded the Military Order of Saint Henry, as well as both classes of the Iron Cross. Theodor Quandt won the Hohenzollern. Alfred Hübner won the Iron Cross. Other aces serving in the squadron included Hans Hoyer, Kurt Jacob, and Richard Plange.

== Aircraft ==
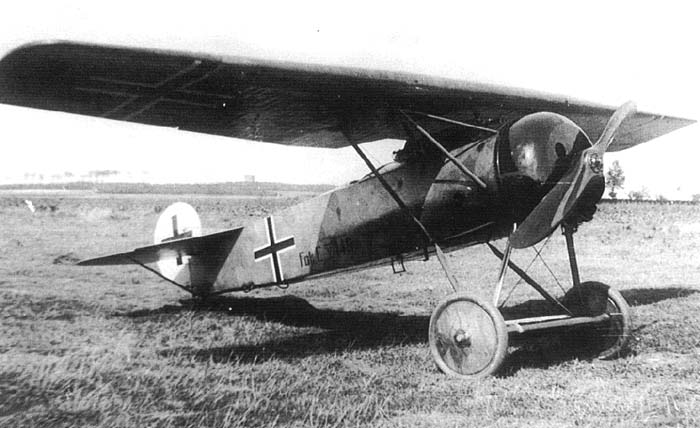
A Fokker D.VIII.

The squadron was initially assigned Albatros D.IIIs. It was also known to operate Fokker Dr.I triplanes, which were first introduced in August 1917. The Fokker D.VII was introduced in Spring 1918, and also served with Jasta 36. It was also fortunate to have some of the scarce Fokker D.VIIIs assigned to the squadron.
