= Kirchbarkau =

- Municipality
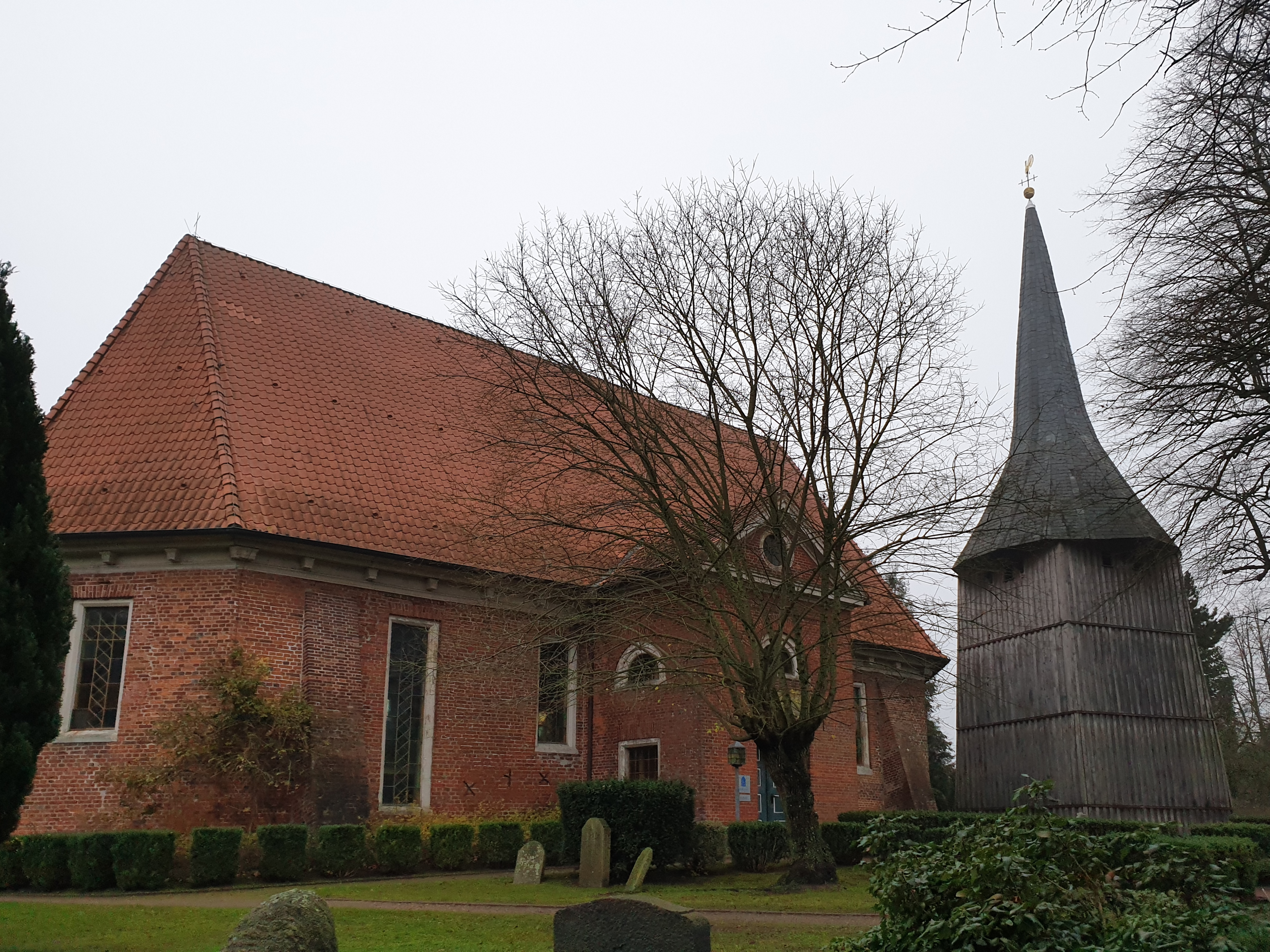
- Church in Kirchbarkau

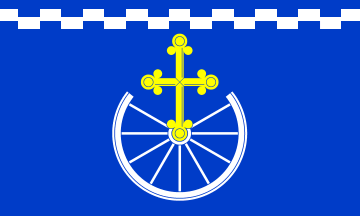
- Flag Coat of arms

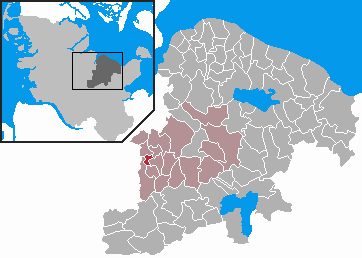
- Location of Kirchbarkau within Plön district
- Interactive map of Kirchbarkau
- Location within Germany Location within Schleswig-Holstein
- Coordinates: 54°13′N 10°9′E
- Country: Germany
- State: Schleswig-Holstein
- District: Plön
- Municipal assoc.: Preetz-Land

Government
  - Mayor: Franz Schwarten

Area
  - Total: 2.16 km^{2} (0.83 sq mi)
- Elevation: 38 m (125 ft)

Population (2025-12-31)
  - Total: 820
  - Density: 380/km^{2} (980/sq mi)
- Time zone: UTC+01:00 (CET)
  - Summer (DST): UTC+02:00 (CEST)
- Postal codes: 24245
- Dialling codes: 04302
- Vehicle registration: PLÖ
- Website: www.amtpreetzland.de

Kirchbarkau is a municipality in the district of Plön, in Schleswig-Holstein, Germany.
