= Dorothy Carrington =

- Born: 10 June 1910; Perrotts Brook, Gloucestershire, UK
- Died: 26 January 2002 (aged 91); Ajaccio, France
- Occupations: Travel writer; historian; anthropologist
- Writing career
- Period: 1947–2002
- Notable work: Granite Island: Portrait of Corsica

Frederica Dorothy Violet Carrington, Lady Rose, MBE (6 June 1910 – 26 January 2002) was an expatriate British writer domiciled for over half her life in Corsica. She was one of the twentieth century's leading scholars on the island's culture and history, about which she wrote numerous books and articles.

== Early life ==
Dorothy Carrington was the daughter of Major General Sir Frederick Carrington, known for crushing the Matabele Rebellion and a friend of Cecil Rhodes. Her mother was Susan Elwes. Both her parents had died by the time she was eleven. She read English at Lady Margaret Hall, Oxford. She married an Austrian, Franz von Waldschultz, whose family estates in Poland had been destroyed during the First World War. She and Franz went to Southern Rhodesia, but she returned to England after the Annexation of Austria and divorced. However Franz preferred Rhodesia and stayed and built an estate called Wilton. A second marriage, to Darcy Sproul-Bolton, ended with his death in the late 1930s.

She then immersed herself in the London art world, and in 1942 organised an exhibition at the Leicester Galleries, "Imaginative Art since the War". One of the exhibitors was the surrealist painter Sir Francis Rose, whom she married in 1943. He was a friend of Gertrude Stein.

== Corsica ==
In July 1948, Carrington and Rose made the first of four trips to Corsica. She had intended to write a book and move on. But in 1954 she settled on the island in Ajaccio, without Rose. They divorced in 1966.

In 1971 she wrote Granite Island. Later works included The Dream Hunters of Corsica, which examined occult practices in Corsica, and Napoleon And His Parents On The Threshold Of History. Partly as a result of her work in the 1950s, French archaeologists were persuaded to travel to Corsica and study the now famous megalithic site of Filitosa.

Carrington was elected Fellow of the Royal Historical Society and of the Royal Society of Literature in 1971. In 1986 she was made a Chevalier de l'Ordre des Arts et des Lettres. The University of Corsica gave her an honorary doctorate in 1991 and the Queen awarded her an MBE in 1995. Granite Island won the Heinemann Award in 1971.

== Major works ==
- Evelina and the Bag of Crimson Seed (1945)
- The Traveller's Eye (1947)
- The Mouse And The Mermaid (1948)
- Trésors oubliés des églises de Corse en collaboration avec G. Moracchini (1959)
- This Corsica - The Complete Guide (1962)
- Granite Island: Portrait Of Corsica (1971) translation: La Corse (1980, 1987)
- Napoleon And His Parents On The Threshold Of History (1988) translation: Napoléon et ses parents au seuil de l'histoire (1993)
- The Dream Hunters Of Corsica (1995), translation Mazzeri, Finzioni, Signadori, Aspects magico-religieux de la culture corse (1998).
- En Corse avec Francis Rose (1995)
- Portrait de Charles Bonaparte d'après ses écrits de jeunesse et ses mémoires (2002)
