= Edmund O'Toole =

Recipient of the Victoria Cross

Edmund O'Toole VC
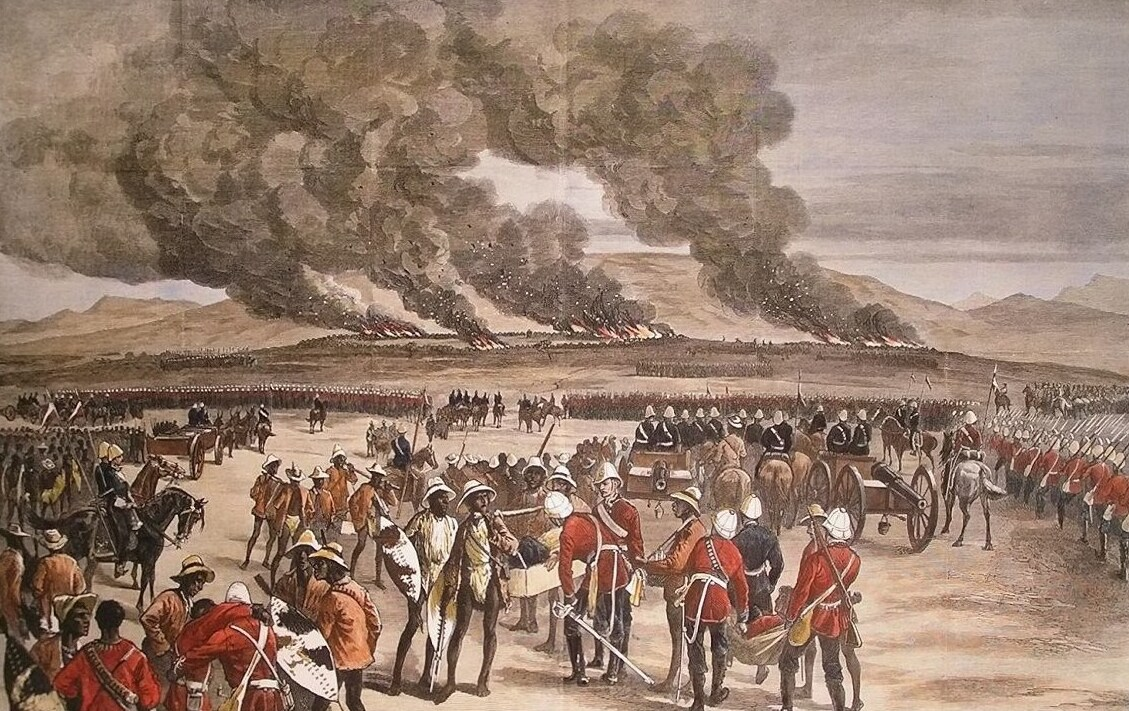
- The burning of Ulundi
- Born: Dublin, Ireland
- Military career
- Allegiance: Cape Colony
- Branch: Cape Colonial Forces
- Rank: Captain
- Nickname: Pat or Paddy
- Units: Cape Frontier Light Horse
- Conflicts: Anglo-Zulu War: Battle of Ulundi
- Awards: Victoria Cross

Edmond Joseph O'Toole VC was an Irish recipient of the Victoria Cross, the highest and most prestigious award for gallantry in the face of the enemy that can be awarded to British and Commonwealth forces.

== Origins ==
He was the fourth son of Charles O'Toole of Wilford, Bray, Ireland and brother of Luke O'Toole of Toole and Company, Seed Merchants. He was baptised in Dublin in 1848. It had been previously claimed falsely that he was born at Grahamstown, South Africa, but it has been shown that he was born in Ireland of an Irish family. Several sources report his death as 1891 in Salisbury, Rhodesia but there is a reference to him being a resident of the "Cape" in 1900. and Tanser states the Darter's claim that he died in 1891 is incorrect.

He was always known as Pat or Paddy O'Toole. His first name is sometimes spelt as Edmond.

== Details ==
He was a Sergeant in the Frontier Light Horse, British Colonial forces during the Zulu War when the following deed took place for which he was awarded the VC.

On 3 July 1879 at Ulundi, Zululand, South Africa, during the retirement of a reconnoitering party, a captain (Lord William Leslie de la Poer Beresford) of the 9th Lancers went to the assistance of Sergeant Fitzmaurice of the 24th Regiment whose horse had fallen and rolled on him. The Zulus were coming up quickly in great numbers, but the officer, with help from Sergeant O'Toole, managed to mount the injured man behind him. He was, however, so dizzy that the sergeant, who had been keeping back the enemy, gave up his carbine and rode alongside to hold him on. They all finally reached safety.

Beresford's VC was gazetted on 23 August 1879. It is reported that when he collected his medal from the Queen he told her that "he could not in honour receive the recognition of his services unless it were shared in by Sergeant O’Toole". O'Toole was then gazetted on 10 October 1879.

Her Majesty pinning it on to the hero's breast, but not before he had explained to his Queen he could not in honour receive recognition of any services he had been able to perform, unless Sergeant O'Toole's services were also recognised, as he deserved infinitely greater credit than any that might attach to himself. The Queen, appreciating this generosity and soldierly honesty, bestowed the reward also on Sergeant Edmund OToole of Baker's Horse, and Lord William was satisfied.

He later achieved the rank of Captain.
