= Heinrich Bongartz =

- Born: 31 January 1892; Gelsenkirchen, Westphalia
- Died: 23 January 1946 (aged 53); Rheinberg, Rhineland
- Military career
- Allegiance: Germany
- Branch: Luftstreitkräfte (Air Service)
- Service years: 1914–1918, c. 1938 – 1945
- Rank: Oberstleutnant
- Units: Flieger-Abteilung 5; Jagdstaffel 36; Kampfstaffel 27
- Commands: Jagdstaffel 36
- Awards: Pour le Mérite; Royal House Order of Hohenzollern; Iron Cross First and Second Class
- Other work: Night fighter commander in World War II

Heinrich Bongartz PlM, HOH, IC (31 January 1892 – 23 January 1946), was a German World War I fighter pilot and flying ace credited with 33 confirmed victories and one unconfirmed. He also served as a night fighter commander in World War II.

== Early life ==
Heinrich Bongartz was born in Gelsenkirchen, Westphalia, on 31 January 1892. In civilian life, Bongartz was a schoolteacher. He came to the German air service after enlisting in the 16th Infantry Regiment in August 1914, transferring to the 13th Infantry Regiment as a Sturmoffizier, and seeing action in the Battle of Verdun. He transferred to the Luftstreitkräfte (German Air Service) for pilot training with Flieger-Abteilung (Flier Detachment) 5 and was commissioned a Leutnant in March, 1916. Upon graduation, he was posted to a reconnaissance unit, Kampfgeschwader (Tactical Bomber Wing) 5. From there, he had a short lived tour with Kampfstaffel (Tactical Bomber Squadron) 27; a unit that was soon to be recast as Schutzstaffel (Protection Squadron) 8. Bongartz was finally assigned to flying fighter aircraft with Royal Prussian Jagdstaffel 36 in April 1917.

== Service as a fighter pilot ==
His initial success as a fighter pilot came during Bloody April, so called such because of the severe losses suffered by the Royal Flying Corps. Bongartz contributed to the British bloodshed by claiming four victories during April—a Spad VII, a Caudron and a pair of observation balloons. He became an ace on 2 May.

Bongartz's third, fourth, and sixth through eighth solo victories came over balloons, and the remainder of his victories were over aircraft. He accrued victims at a steady rate when he scored, with a triple victory day on 31 October, and three days on which he shot down two enemy aircraft.

On 12 July 1917, he shot down number 11; by now his aerial gallantry had earned him both classes of the Iron Cross. The next day, Bongartz was wounded for the first time, the first of five wounds he would receive during the war. Possibly because of this wound, he did not score again until 26 September. Also in September 1917, he succeeded to command of Jasta 36. In October, he scored eight times, raising his count to 20. In November 1917, he was wounded again, but still managed to down another five enemy aircraft, with one more unconfirmed. On 24 November 1917, he was awarded the Royal House Order of Hohenzollern.

On 23 December 1917, he was personally awarded the Pour le Mérite by Kaiser Wilhelm II. With two victories in December, one in January, and two on 5 February 1918, he had run his total to 30 confirmed victories. His final two victories came on 27 March. On 30 March 1918, he was downed by anti-aircraft fire. He was injured, and his plane was damaged.

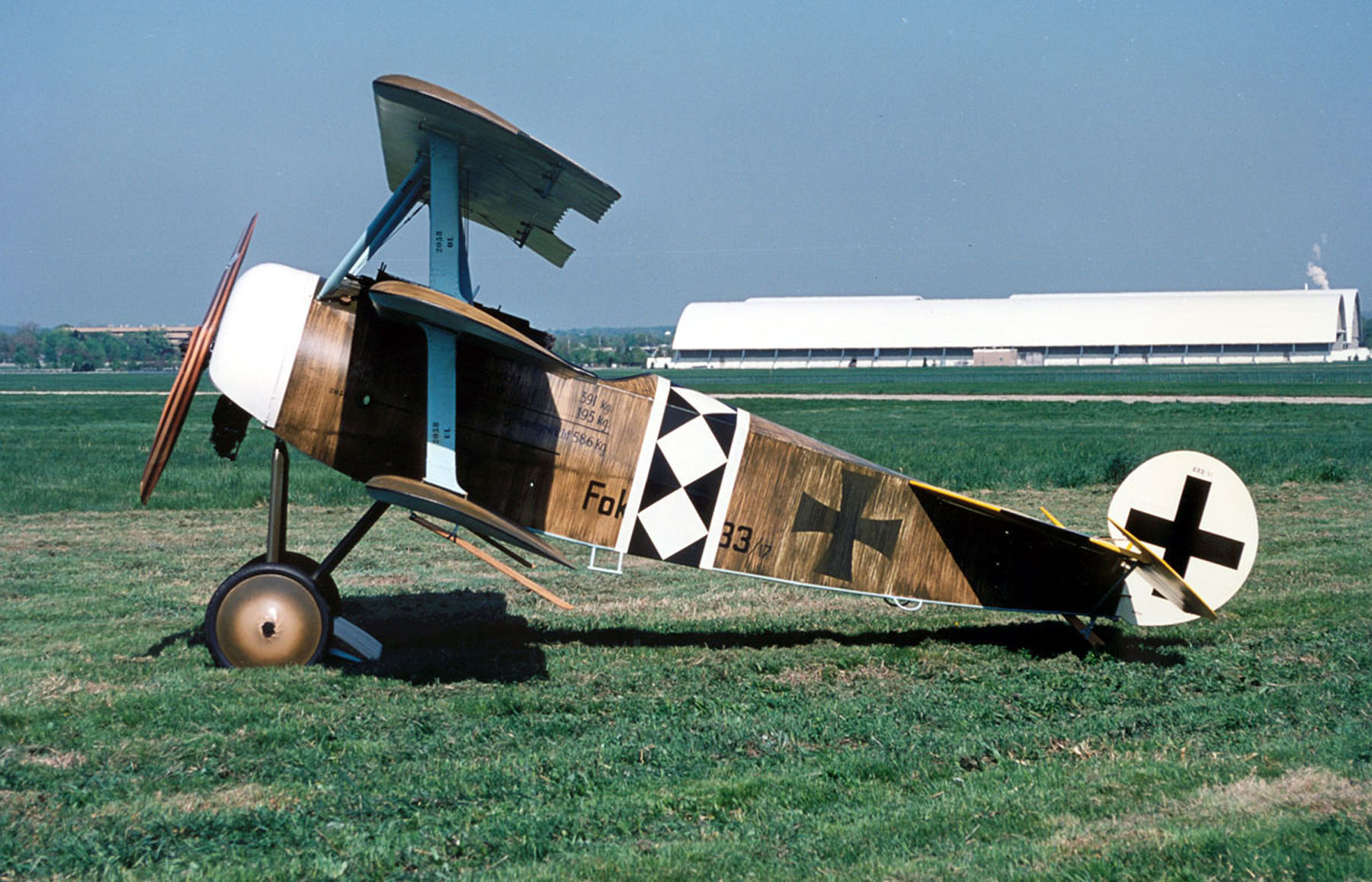
A Fokker Dr. 1 similar to the one Bongartz flew

On 25 April 1918 he was wounded yet again. Nevertheless, on the 29th, he took on several Royal Air Force planes of No. 74 Squadron single-handed. Bongartz had none other than Captain Mick Mannock on his tail, while Captain C. B. Glynn made a head-on firing pass at the German ace. Among the bullets that riddled Bongartz's Fokker Dr.1 Triplane was one which hit him in the left temple, took out his left eye, and stuck in his nose, obstructing his breathing. He spun almost to the ground before mastering his pain and regaining control. Despite excruciating pain and semiconsciousness, he managed a crash landing near Kemmel Hill, but flipped his plane over. He crawled from under it and still had the presence of mind to check his aircraft's damage and to bow an introduction to his rescuers and introduce himself. One German infantryman rescuer noted the grotesquerie of the eyeball dangling down Bongartz's cheek during the bow. He commented about his wound, "Yes, yes, we all take our turn."

It was the end of the war for both Bongartz and his plane. His partial blinding and loss of depth perception, ended Bongartz's war but not his aviation career. The airplane, so badly shot about that it had 28 bullet holes in the cowling alone, was scrapped.

After he recovered from his wound, he became the commander of the Aircraft Test Center at Aldershof. While serving as test pilot there, he wrote a report on the Dornier-Zeppelin D.I fighter prototype, which was the first plane to use a stressed skin/torsion box structure. Bongartz's estimate of it was, "Doesn't possess characteristics of a modern fighter. Ailerons too heavy." Nevertheless, the engineering originated by Claudius Dornier is still in use today.

== Between the wars ==
Once the war ended, he served as a postwar Director of the German Aeroplane Inspectorate. After helping deactivate the air service in which he had served so gallantly, he went on to fight against the Spartakists who were attempting to overthrow the German government. The leg wound he suffered in this fight finally ended his military career.

In January 1921, he crashed while flying an exhibition flight, and was injured once more, but did not let it stop him from flying.

Later in life, he became the Director of German Air Trade. His book Luftmacht Deutschland was published in 1941.

== World War II and beyond ==
During World War II, he originally served as an Oberstleutnant in supply during 1941 to 1942 at Pleskau on the Eastern Front. 1943 found him as a night fighter commander at Grove in Denmark. In 1944, he transferred to command of night fighter efforts in Finland. He transferred once more, and served through war's end.

He survived World War II, only to die of a heart attack on 23 January 1946, while in Rheinberg.
