= Philip F. Fullard =

British WWI flying ace and Royal Air Force Air Commodore (1897-1984)

Philip Fletcher Fullard
- Born: 27 May 1897; Wimbledon, Surrey, England
- Died: 24 April 1984 (aged 86); Broadstairs, Kent, England
- Military career
- Allegiance: United Kingdom
- Branch: British Army; Royal Air Force
- Service years: 1915–1946
- Rank: Air Commodore
- Units: No. 1 Squadron RFC; No. 12 Squadron RAF; No. 4 Squadron RAF
- Commands: No. 2 Squadron RAF; No. 5 Squadron RAF; No. 3 (Apprentices) Wing; No. 14 (Fighter) Group; No. 246 (Special Operations) Group
- Conflicts: First World War; Mohmand campaign Second World War
- Awards: Commander of the Order of the British Empire; Distinguished Service Order; Military Cross & Bar; Air Force Cross; Mentioned in Despatches; Croix de guerre (Belgium)

Air Commodore Philip Fletcher Fullard, CBE, DSO, MC & Bar, AFC (27 May 1897 – 24 April 1984) was an English First World War flying ace, one of the most successful fighter pilots of the Royal Flying Corps, with a reputation as a superb combat leader. With 40 confirmed victories, he was the top scoring ace of WW1 flying Nieuports, and overall the 6th highest scoring British pilot, and the 2nd highest to survive the war.

== Background ==
Fullard was born in Wimbledon, Surrey, the son of Thomas Fletcher Fullard. He was educated at Norwich Grammar School, where he was an accomplished sportsman, captaining the school hockey and football teams. It is claimed that he played as a centre half for Norwich City Football Club's reserve team while still at school, though the club has stated that they have no record of this.

== Military service ==
=== First World War ===
Fullard joined the Inns of Court Officer Training Corps in 1915, and after receiving high marks in his examination was offered a commission in the Royal Irish Fusiliers, but was then selected for the Royal Flying Corps. He was commissioned as a probationary temporary second lieutenant for duty with the RFC on 5 August 1916. He trained at the No. 2 School of Military Aeronautics at Oxford, with No. 3/24 Reserve Squadron, and at the Central Flying School at Upavon, and on 26 December was appointed a flying officer and confirmed in his rank as a second lieutenant on the General List. Fullard soloed after only three hours flying time, and on account of his exceptional flying ability, he was retained as an instructor at Upavon, but was eventually sent to serve in No. 1 Squadron RFC in France in May 1917.

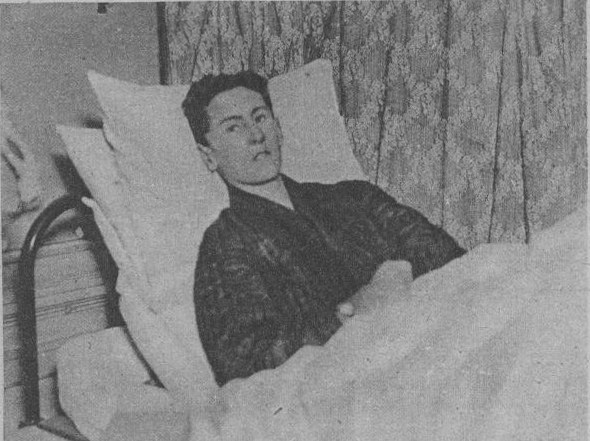
1918

Flying various models of Nieuport Scout throughout his combat career, Fullard scored steadily over the next six months. He opened his victory log with two victories in May, followed by five in June. On 19 June, still only a second lieutenant, he was appointed a flight commander with the temporary rank of captain. In this role he scored more victories, with eight in July, and twelve in August. He damaged the blood vessels in one eye while flying in September, resulting in temporary blindness that grounded him for much of the month. Fullard was awarded the Military Cross and Bar in September 1917; both awards were announced in the same edition of the London Gazette. Fullard recovered to score eleven more victories in October, and two in November, including the 8-victory ace Leutnant Hans Hoyer. He was also awarded the Distinguished Service Order. Two days after his 40th victory he suffered a compound fracture of the leg during a soccer match between his squadron and an infantry battalion. He did not return to duty until near the end of the war, when on 24 September 1918 he was appointed acting major.

During his period of active service Fullard once brought down four German aircraft in a single day, and he and another pilot once brought down seven enemy aircraft before breakfast, with Fullard accounting for three. Also, during the three months Fullard served as commander, his flight of six pilots brought down more enemy aircraft than any other in France, without suffering a single casualty. In one combat Fullard's flying goggles were shot away from his eyes and some Verey lights in his aircraft ignited, setting his aircraft partially on fire, but he managed to fly back to the British lines. Besides his three gallantry awards, he had two further recommendations. One of these was for the Victoria Cross.

A curious fact is that he scored all of his victories flying other variants of the same Nieuport 17 design (the Nieuports 23 and 27) during the war, becoming most successful Nieuport pilot in general.

=== Inter war years ===
On 3 June 1919 Fullard was awarded the Air Force Cross, and on 1 August he was granted a permanent commission in the RAF with the rank of captain. He immediately took a leave of absence, being on half-pay from 1 August until 12 November 1919. On 16 December 1919 he was appointed a flight commander with No. 12 Squadron, attached to the Army of Occupation in Germany. In March 1920 was awarded the Belgian Croix de Guerre. For two months he served as acting-officer commanding of No. 12 Squadron, from May 1922 until it was disbanded, before returning to England to serve as adjutant of No. 4 Squadron from 29 July. From 1 May 1924 he attended the 3rd Course at the RAF Staff College at Andover, and on 1 June 1925 was posted to the Air Ministry to serve on the staff of the Directorate of Operations and Intelligence. On 1 March 1929 Fullard was posted to the Headquarters of RAF Iraq Command, to serve on the Operations and Training Staff, and on 13 October he was promoted to squadron leader. Fullard returned to England in May 1931, but in September and October he was again placed on the half-pay list. He then attended the Army's Senior Officers' School at Sheerness, then was again on half-pay from January to March 1932, when he was appointed to the staff of the School of Army Co-operation. Fullard was Officer Commanding, No. 2 (Army Co-operation) Squadron from 7 January to 1 December 1933.

He then travelled to India where he attended the Staff College at Quetta until July 1935. On 15 July 1935 he was appointed Officer Commanding, No. 5 (Army Co-operation) Squadron at Risalpur, to take part in the 2nd Mohmand campaign against rebellious tribes in the North-West Frontier Province. By October 1935 the squadron was stationed at Chaklala, near Rawalpindi. On 1 January 1936 Fullard was promoted to wing commander, relinquishing command of No. 5 Squadron on 25 February. On 8 May Fullard received a mention in despatches in recognition of his "gallant and distinguished service rendered in connection with the Mohmand operations on the North West Frontier, India, during the period August 15–16 and October 15–16, 1935". On 10 July 1936 Fullard was appointed Officer Commanding, No. 3 (Apprentices) Wing based at RAF Halton, then on 20 July 1938 he was posted to the Headquarters of Maintenance Command in London to serve on the staff. From 27 July 1939 he served of the Operations Staff of No. 11 (Fighter) Group, and was promoted to group captain on 1 July.

=== Second World War ===
During the Second World War Fullard commanded No. 14 (Fighter) Group, part of the British Expeditionary Force in France, from January 1940, until it was disbanded on 22 June, following the battle of France. From November he served as Senior Air Staff Officer (SASO) at the headquarters of No. 10 (Fighter) Group. On 1 January 1941 Fullard was made a Commander of the Order of the British Empire (CBE), and on 1 March was promoted to temporary air commodore. He went on serve as Duty Air Commodore at Fighter Command Headquarters from 2 June 1942, and as Air Officer Commanding, No. 246 (Special Operations) Group from 3 July 1943.

== Post military life ==
Fullard retired from the RAF on 20 November 1946 at the age of 49, and served as chairman of several engineering companies. In 1978, at the age of 81, he was interviewed by Peter Liddle, and his recollections formed part of a book published in 2011.

Fullard died in a hospital at Broadstairs, Kent, England, near where he lived on 24 April 1984, month before his 87th birthday. At the time of his death, he was highest scoring living British ace, and after Donald MacLaren, who died four years later highest scoring living ace of WW1 overall.

== Awards and citations ==
Fullard's 40 victories consisted of one shared aircraft captured, 15 aircraft destroyed and 22 'out of control', including two shared. He held the Distinguished Service Order, Military Cross and bar, Air Force Cross, and was made a Commander of the Order of the British Empire.

Military Cross
Temporary Second Lieutenant (Temporary Captain) Philip Fletcher Fullard, General List and RFC.
For conspicuous gallantry and devotion to duty when engaged in aerial combat. He has on four occasions attacked and destroyed enemy aircraft, and has in addition engaged in 25 indecisive combats, in which he has shown fine leadership, great dash and determination to close with the enemy.

Bar to Military Cross
Temporary Captain Philip Fletcher Fullard, MC, General List and RFC.
For conspicuous gallantry and devotion to duty. He has on many occasions displayed the utmost dash and fearlessness in attacking enemy aircraft at close range and in destroying at least eight hostile machines during a period of about ten days. His determination and fine offensive spirit have in almost every instance resulted in disaster to the enemy.

Distinguished Service Order
Temporary Captain Philip Fletcher Fullard, M.C., General List and RFC.
For conspicuous gallantry and devotion to duty. As a patrol leader and scout pilot he is without equal. The moral effect of his presence in a patrol is most marked. He has now accounted for fourteen machines destroyed and eighteen driven down out of control in a little over four months.
Air Force Cross - gazetted on 3 June 1919.
Croix de Guerre (Belgium) - gazetted on 1 April 1920.
Commander of the Order of the British Empire - gazetted on 1st January 1941.

== See also ==
- List of World War I aces credited with 20 or more victories
