= Frederick Carrington =

British army officer (1844–1913)

Major-General Sir Frederick Carrington KCB KCMG
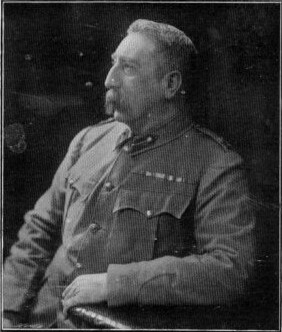
- Born: 23 August 1844; Cheltenham
- Died: 22 March 1913 (aged 68); Cheltenham
- Relatives: Dorothy Carrington (daughter)
- Military career
- Allegiance: United Kingdom
- Branch: British Army
- Rank: Major-General
- Commands: Frontier Light Horse; 2nd Mounted Infantry
- Conflicts: Ninth Frontier War; Basuto Gun War; First Matabele War; Matabele Rebellion; Second Anglo-Boer War; Sekhukhune Wars
- Awards: Knight Commander of the Order of the Bath; Knight Commander of the Order of St Michael and St George

Major-General Sir Frederick Carrington, KCB, KCMG (23 August 1844 – 22 March 1913) was a British Army officer best known for his role in the Second Matabele War.

== Biography ==
Carrington was educated at Cheltenham College and joined the 24th Regiment of Foot in 1864.

In 1875, he arrived in South Africa where he raised and commanded the Mounted Infantry in the Griqualand West expedition and the Frontier Light Horse in the Ninth Frontier War in 1877.

He commanded the Transvaal Volunteer Force against Sekhukhune in 1878–1879 and the Cape Mounted Riflemen in the Basuto Gun War of 1881. He was severely wounded in this campaign.

In 1885, he accompanied Sir Charles Warren's expedition to Bechuanaland in command of the 2nd Mounted Infantry, which soon became known as 'Carrington's Horse'.

He commanded the Bechuanaland Police beginning in 1888. He also was appointed military adviser to the High Commissioner in the First Matabele War and commanded the British force in the Matabele Rebellion in 1896.

Carrington was in command of Belfast district in 1899–1900. Following the outbreak of the Second Boer War in October 1899, he was appointed on the staff of the South Africa Field Force on 28 February 1900, with the local rank of a lieutenant-general to be in command of the Rhodesian Field Force. This was a field force established to prevent attacks on Rhodesia from the south, and the soldiers were drawn from the various colonial contingents in the war, including the South Australian Citizen Bushmen (though not from Rhodesia itself). Carrington left for South Africa in March 1900 on the SS Dunottar Castle, and arrived in Cape Town the following month. He subsequently accompanied the force by sea to Beira on the SS Aurora.

He was created a Knight Commander of the Order of St Michael and St George (KCMG) in 1887, a Knight Commander of the Order of the Bath (KCB) in 1897, and retired with the rank of major-general.

He was the father-in-law of World War I fighter ace William Mayes Fry and the father of the writer Dorothy Carrington.

== Bibliography ==
"Carrington, Sir Frederick". Standard Encyclopaedia of Southern Africa. Vol. 3. Nasou Limited. 1971. pp. 105–6. ISBN 978-0-625-00324-2.
